= National Register of Historic Places listings in Inyo County, California =

Location of Inyo County in California

This is a list of the National Register of Historic Places listings in Inyo County, California.

This is intended to be a complete list of the properties and districts on the National Register of Historic Places in Inyo County, California, United States. Latitude and longitude coordinates are provided for many National Register properties and districts; these locations may be seen together in an online map.

There are 19 properties and districts listed on the National Register in the county, including 2 National Historic Landmarks.

This National Park Service list is complete through NPS recent listings posted September 4, 2026.

== Current listings ==
	Name on the Register	Image	Date listed	Location	City or town	Description
1	Archeological Site CA-INY-134		March 12, 2003 (#03000116)	Address Restricted	Olancha	
2	Big and Little Petroglyph Canyons	Big and Little Petroglyph Canyons	October 15, 1966 (#99001178)	Address Restricted	China Lake	
3	Coso Hot Springs	Coso Hot Springs	January 3, 1978 (#78000674)	Address Restricted	Little Lake	
4	Coso Rock Art District	Coso Rock Art District	October 8, 1999 (#66000209)	Address Restricted	China Lake	
5	Death Valley Junction Historic District	Death Valley Junction Historic District	December 10, 1980 (#80000802)	State Route 127 and State Route 190; 36°18′08″N 116°24′54″W	Death Valley Junction	
6	Death Valley Scotty Historic District	Death Valley Scotty Historic District	July 20, 1978 (#78000297)	On State Route 72, Death Valley National Park; 37°01′33″N 117°22′02″W	Death Valley National Park	
7	Eagle Borax Works	Eagle Borax Works	December 31, 1974 (#74000338)	Death Valley National Park; 36°12′04″N 116°51′54″W	Furnace Creek	
8	Fossil Falls Archeological District	Fossil Falls Archeological District	July 9, 1980 (#80004492)	Restricted	Little Lake	
9	Harmony Borax Works	Harmony Borax Works	December 31, 1974 (#74000339)	Death Valley National Park; 36°28′47″N 116°52′32″W	Stovepipe Wells	
10	Inyo County Courthouse	Inyo County Courthouse	January 23, 1998 (#97001664)	168 N. Edwards Street, Independence; 36°48′13″N 118°11′56″W	Independence	
11	Laws Narrow Gauge Railroad Historic District	Laws Narrow Gauge Railroad Historic District	October 1, 1981 (#81000149)	U.S. Route 6, northeast of Bishop; 37°24′06″N 118°20′50″W	Laws	
12	Leadfield	Leadfield	June 10, 1975 (#75000221)	Death Valley National Park, on Titus Canyon Trail; 36°50′50″N 117°03′27″W	Death Valley National Park	
13	Manzanar War Relocation Center, National Historic Site	Manzanar War Relocation Center, National Historic Site	July 30, 1976 (#76000484)	U.S. Route 395; 6 miles south of Independence; 36°43′42″N 118°09′16″W	Independence	
14	Patsiata Tübiji Nüümü-na Awaedu Ananisudüheina (Patsiata Historic District)		March 3, 2025 (#100009210)	Address Restricted	Lone Pine vicinity	
15	Pawona Witu		October 14, 1975 (#75000428)	Address Restricted	Bishop	
16	Reilly		January 2, 2004 (#03001358)	West side of the Panamint Valley; 36°00′25″N 117°22′08″W	Trona	
17	Ryan Historic District	Ryan Historic District	January 27, 2025 (#100011330)	Address Restricted	Death Valley vicinity	
18	Saline Valley Salt Tram Historic Structure	Saline Valley Salt Tram Historic Structure	December 31, 1974 (#74000514)	Inyo Mountains, north of Keeler between Gordo Peak and New York Butte; 36°36′39″N 117°51′19″W	Inyo Mountains	
19	Skidoo	Skidoo	April 16, 1974 (#74000349)	Death Valley National Park, Wildrose District; 36°25′59″N 117°07′46″W	Death Valley National Park	

== See also ==
- List of National Historic Landmarks in California
- National Register of Historic Places listings in California
- California Historical Landmarks in Inyo County, California
