= Coso Peak =

Mountain in California, United States

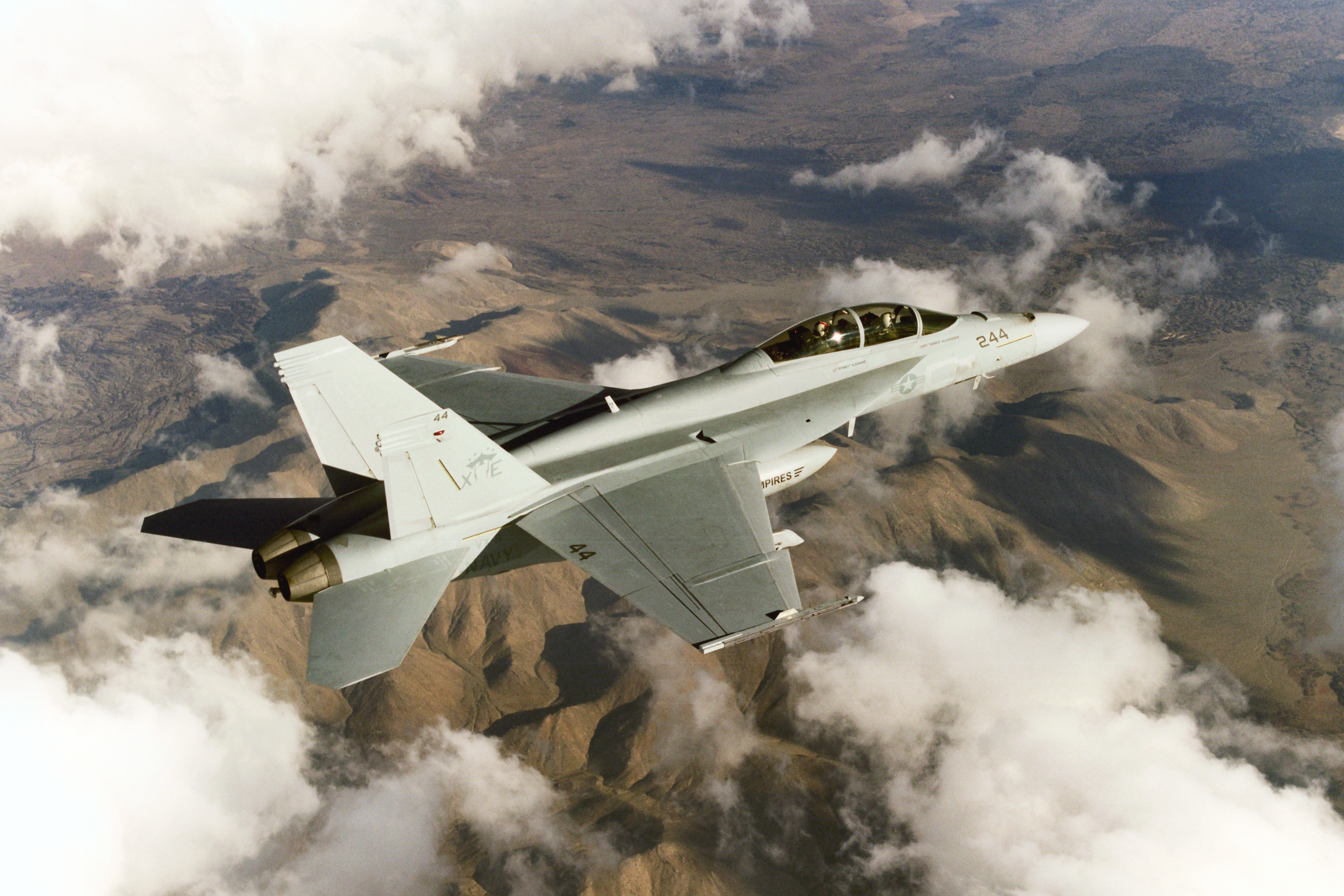
- A U.S. Navy F/A-18F Super Hornet from NAWS China Lake seen over the Coso Range

Highest point
- Elevation: 8,157 ft (2,486 m)
- Coordinates: 36°12′10″N 117°42′49″W

Geography
- Location within California
- Location: Inyo County, California
- Parent range: Coso Range
- Topo map: USGS Coso Peak

Coso Peak is the highest summit in the Coso Range, a small mountain range east of the Sierra Nevada, in Inyo County in the U.S. state of California. The peak has an elevation of 8,157 feet (2,486 metres) and a topographic prominence of 2,489 ft (759 m), making it the 88th most prominent mountain in California.

While much of the northern part of the Coso Range is within the Coso Range Wilderness protected area, administered by the Bureau of Land Management (BLM), Coso Peak itself and much of the southern part of the range is within the boundaries of Naval Air Weapons Station China Lake, a U.S. Navy research, testing, and evaluation installation. Coso Peak and the Coso Range also form part of the Basin and Range Province, along with neighboring mountains and ranges, such as the Argus Range.

Nearby peaks in the Coso Range include 7,668 ft (2,337 m) Pinon Peak to the west, and 7,550 ft (2,301 m) Silver Peak to the south.

== Naming ==
The origin of the name "Coso," applied to Coso Peak, the Coso Range, and Coso Hot Springs, is not entirely clear. It may be from the Timbisha or Panamint language of the Native American tribes indigenous to the Owens Valley and Death Valley region since prehistoric times, in which kosoowa or kosoowah was "be steamy," possibly referring to the hot springs (which Jon P. Dayley's Tümpisa (Panamint) Shoshone Dictionary says were called Kooso and the people from there koosotsi).

Coso, or variations on the word (kosso, etc.) are also known and referenced as a Mono (or Paiute, though this is not really accurate because those groups are not contiguous) word in some dialects for 'fire'.

Gustav Gudde's California Place Names notes that the name began to appear on maps when prospectors appeared in the region in the 1860s. The name Coso Mountains appears on an official State Geological Survey of California map from 1874; in 1913 the U.S. Geological Survey officially named them the Coso Range. Coso Peak itself appears by 1877 on a U.S. Army Corps of Engineers map.

== See also ==
- List of mountain peaks of California
- Coso Volcanic Field
- Coso Rock Art District
