= Coso =

Coso or COSO may refer to:

- Coso (former settlement), California
- Coso Junction, California
- Coso Range, in eastern California
- Coso Hot Springs, in the Coso Volcanic Field
- Coso Volcanic Field, in southeastern California
- Coso artifact, found in 1961
- Coso people, Native American tribe associated with the Coso Range

== COSO ==
- Cash or share option, a warrant where the settlement is either cash or physical delivery of shares
- Committee of Sponsoring Organizations of the Treadway Commission, to combat corporate fraud
