= Archeological Site CA-INY-134 =

Archaeological site in California, United States

- U.S. National Register of Historic Places
- Nearest city: Olancha, California
- Area: 9.1 acres (3.7 ha)
- NRHP reference No.: 03000116
- Added to NRHP: March 12, 2003

Archeological Site CA-INY-134, in Inyo County, California near Olancha, California, is an archeological site that is listed on the National Register of Historic Places (NRHP). The site is located in the Coso Range 6 miles (9.7 km) northwest of Coso Hot Springs. It has also been known as Ayer's Rock Pictograph Site, as Bob Rabbit's Pictographs, as INY-134 and as INY-105. Prehistorically, it served as a camp and as a ceremonial site. The site includes three pictograph panels carved into a monolith. The pictographs are painted in a variety of colors and depict animal and human figures.

A 9.1-acre (3.7 ha) area was listed on the NRHP in 2003.

The site was described by David S. Whitley, Tamara K. Whitley, and Joseph M. Simon in a 2005 publication of the Maturango Museum, located in Ridgecrest, California.
