= Coso (former settlement), California =

Coso
- Former settlement
- Location in California Coso (the United States)
- Coordinates: 36°10′36″N 117°38′49″W
- Country: United States
- State: California
- County: Inyo
- Elevation: 5,784 ft (1,763 m)

Coso (also Granite Springs) was a settlement in Inyo County, California, United States. It is located in the Coso Range, 4 miles (6.4 km) east-southeast of Coso Peak. Today, Coso is located within Naval Air Weapons Station China Lake.

Dr. Darwin French discovered gold at the site in 1860. The place was named Granite Springs in 1860. The name Coso comes from the Coso people, local Native Americans.

There are at least three places named Coso in Inyo County. This settlement is sometimes known as Old Coso and is located southwest of Darwin, California. There is also Coso Junction, located on US 395. South of Coso Junction is the rail siding of Coso.
