= Coso Volcanic Field =

Geothermal field in Inyo County, California, United States

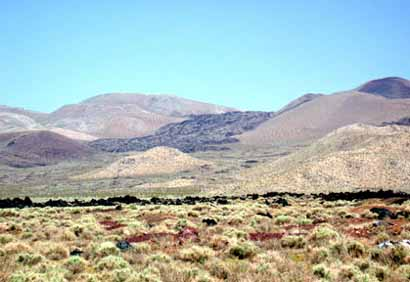
- A basaltic lava flow that is typical of the process that created the stepped terraces of Coso as it flowed across the landscape, producing a more or less flat surface eroding to a sheer front

Highest point
- Elevation: 7,874 ft (2,400 m)
- Coordinates: 36°02′N 117°49′W

Geography
- Location: Inyo County, California, US
- Parent range: Coso Range
- Topo map: USGS Cactus Pk (CA)

Geology
- Rock age: Pliocene to Quaternary
- Mountain type(s): Monogenetic volcanic field and Lava domes
- Last eruption: 39,000 yrs

The Coso Volcanic Field is located in Inyo County, California, at the western edge of the Basin and Range geologic province and northern region of the Mojave Desert. The Fossil Falls are part of the Coso Field, created by the prehistoric Owens River. They are within the Naval Air Weapons Station China Lake and northeast of Little Lake and U.S. Route 395.

== Geology ==
Initiation of volcanism at Coso preceded the onset of Basin and Range crustal extension there, as expressed by normal faulting. The earlier of the two principal periods of volcanism began with the emplacement of basalt flows over a surface of little relief. Then, during the ensuing period of approximately 1.5 million years, eruptive activity included chemically more evolved rocks erupted upon a faulted terrain of substantial relief. Following a 1.5-million-year hiatus with few eruptions, a bimodal volcanic field of basalt lava flows and rhyolite lava domes and flows developed on Basin and Range terrain of essentially the same form as today's landscape. Many of the young basalt flows are inter-canyon, occupying parts of the present-day drainage system.

The Coso Volcanic Field is best known for its Pleistocene rhyolite. Thirty-eight rhyolite domes and flows form an elongate array atop a north-trending 8 by 20 kilometres (5.0 mi × 12.4 mi) horst of Mesozoic bedrock. Nearby uneroded constructional forms are exhibited by most domes. Many are nested within tuff ring craters, and a few filled and overrode their craters to feed flows a kilometer or two long. The two oldest domes contain several percent phenocrysts; the rest are essentially aphyric. Obsidian is exposed locally on most extrusions, and analyses of fresh glass indicate that all of the rhyolite is of the so-called high-silica variety; SiO_{2} content is essentially constant at 77 percent. Other major-element constituents are nearly invariant. However, trace-element contents vary and help define 7 age groups, each of unique chemical composition.

== Prehistoric Period ==
Obsidian from the Coso Volcanic Fields was heavily exploited by Native American Coso People to make knives, projectile points, and the like (Hughes 1998). The chief period of exploitation was between approximately 3000 and 1000 years ago, when people mined obsidian by constructing benches in hillsides and digging deep pits to access raw materials (Elston and Zeier 1984; Gilreath and Hildebrand 1997). Obsidian from the volcanic fields was traded all the way to the California coast in San Diego, San Luis Obispo County, Santa Barbara, California, and throughout the Mojave Desert and regions further east. Archaeologists recognize at least four different geochemical subsources: Sugarloaf, West Sugarloaf, Joshua Ridge, and West Cactus Peak. These different subsources were used to varying degrees in different time periods, but the Sugarloaf and West Sugarloaf were the most commonly exploited geochemical types (Eerkens and Rosenthal 2004; Ericson and Glascock 2004).

== Coso Geothermal Power Project ==
Coso Geothermal Power Project
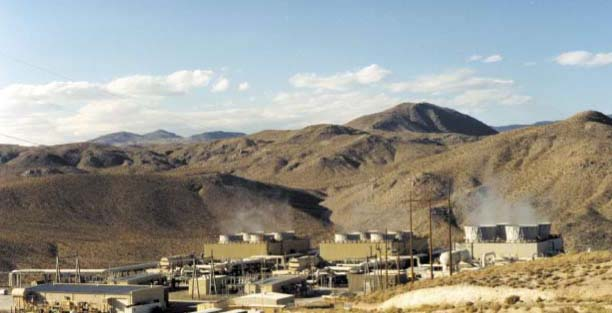
- The Navy 1 geothermal power plant of the Coso Geothermal Power Project
- Official name: Coso Geothermal Power Project
- Country: United States
- Location: NAWS China Lake; Inyo County, California
- Coordinates: 36°02′00″N 117°49′00″W
- Status: Operational
- Commission date: Navy I: May 1987; Navy II: 1988; BLM East: 1989; BLM West: 1989
- Operator: Coso Operating Company

Geothermal power station
- Type: Flash steam
- Wells: 139
- Max. well depth: 13,000 ft (4,000 m)
- Site elevation: 7,874 ft (2,400 m)

Power generation
- Units operational: 3 x 30.7 MW; 6 x 30 MW
- Nameplate capacity: 272.2 MW
- Capacity factor: 53.7%
- Annual net output: 1,175 GWh (2018)

External links
- Website: Coso Operating Company
- Commons: Related media on Commons

The Coso Volcanic Field is well known as a geothermal area. Fumaroles are present along faults bounding the rhyolite-capped horst and locally within the rhyolite field. A multi-disciplinary program of geothermal assessment carried out in the 1970s defined a potential resource of 650 megawatts electric with a nominal life span of 30 years. Judged by the youthfulness of the rhyolite lavas and by a zone of low seismic velocity crust roughly beneath the rhyolite, a magma body may be the source of thermal energy for the geothermal system.

Commercial power development began in the 1980s. Located within the Naval Air Weapons Station China Lake Station near Ridgecrest, California, power plants at the Coso Geothermal were operated by Caithness Energy, LLC (Reno, Nevada) and sold in 2006. It currently produces 270 MW from four geothermal power plants. More than 100 wells have been drilled throughout the field, with production depths from 2,000 to 12,000 feet (610 to 3,700 m), and temperatures from 200 to 350 °C (392 to 662 °F). Coso began generating electricity in 1987. Improvements have resulted in more efficient use of the resource.

== Seismicity ==
The Coso Volcanic Field is one of the most seismically active regions in the United States, producing dozens of tremors in the M1 and M2 range each week. Tremors in the M3 range occur at a rate of 2–6 per month and M4 quakes occur two-three times each year. Recent activity in the M5 range happened in 1996 and 1998 when tremors of M5.3, M5.1, M5.2, and M5.0 occurred within a day of each other. These tremors were actually recorded along the eastern side of the Coso Volcanic Field, 15 miles (24 km). September 30, 2009 to October 6, 2009 there have been 429 earthquakes ranging from 0.1 to 5.2. Some days have activity at about one tremor every minute. On October 2, 2009 there were three earthquakes, (5.2, 4.7, and a 4.9), all within one hour of each other.

On July 4 and 5, 2019, two large earthquakes sparked a surge of activity in the area in and around the Coso Volcanic Field. The first large quake on July 4 registered M6.4 and the largest on July 5 registered M7.1. Within a week, more than 8000 (M1.0–4.5) smaller earthquakes had joined the swarm, though only 27 quakes larger than M4.5 occurred after the largest events. Surprisingly, there were no fatalities in California. Residents in Ridgecrest and neighboring unincorporated town Trona had moderate to severe property damage. Two structure fires, loss of power for up to 24 hours in some areas, and Trona was without water. Highway 178, one of the two ways in or out of Trona was blocked from rockslides and impassable shifted sections of asphalt. Ridgecrest had declared a state of emergency as a result. One fatality was reported in Nevada in the following days.

Earthquake swarms are common in the Coso area, often producing hundreds of tremors over periods as short as a few days. This brisk and robust seismic activity is common in volcanic areas, such as Long Valley Caldera near Mammoth Lakes, and Yellowstone Caldera at Yellowstone. The Coso Volcanic Field shows examples of volcanic activity, probably last active 30,000 to 40,000 years ago, but ash emission and small cone building episodes may be Holocene (>10,000 years) in age.

== See also ==
- Coso Hot Springs
- Coso Range
- Coso Rock Art District
- Fossil Falls
- List of volcanic fields
