= Coso Hot Springs =

Archaeological site in California, US

Coordinates: 36°02′46″N 117°46′13″W

- U.S. National Register of Historic Places
- U.S. Historic district
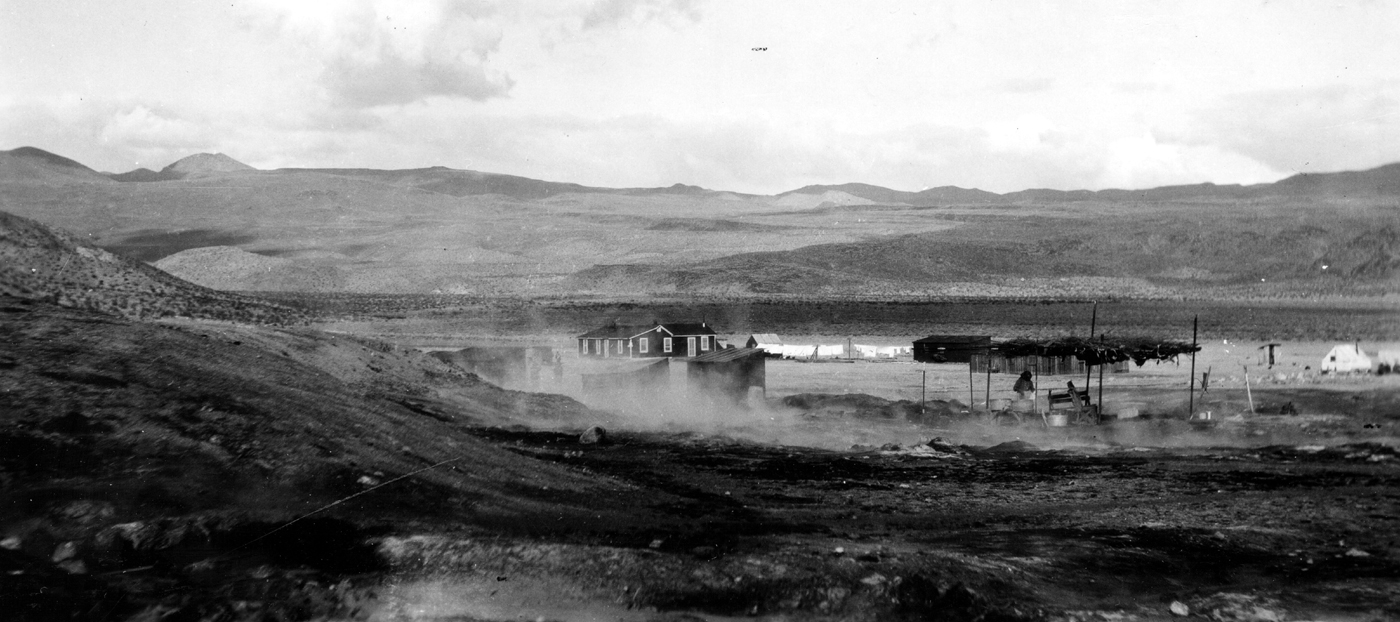
- Coso Hot Springs, Feb. 4, 1920

- Location within California Location within the United States
- Nearest city: Little Lake, Inyo County, California
- Area: 510 acres (210 ha)
- Built: 1900
- Architectural style: Rustic architecture
- NRHP reference No.: 78000674
- Added to NRHP: January 3, 1978

Coso Hot Springs is a hot spring complex in the Coso Volcanic Field in the Mojave Desert of Inyo County, California. The Springs are on the National Register of Historic Places.

== Geography ==
The Coso Hot Springs lie within the boundaries of the Naval Air Weapons Station China Lake (NAWS China Lake), near Little Lake, Inyo County, California and U.S. Route 395. They are near the Coso Mountains, north of Indian Wells Valley and south of the Owens Valley. The hot springs are part of the geothermal activity of the Coso Volcanic Field.

== Water profile ==
The hot mineral water emerges from the ground at 207 °F (97 °C).

== History ==
The springs were a traditional Native American cultural and healing ritual site of the Coso people, and later the Northern Paiute and Timbisha. The site is called Kooso or Muattang Ka in Timbisha. In the 1920s it was a "hot springs resort." Contemporary local Native American people periodically have ceremonies at the springs.

Coso Hot Springs is the site of one of the largest (if not the largest) assemblages of prehistoric rock art in North America. The areas known as Big and Little Petroglyph Canyons by the hot springs have over 20,000 remarkably undisturbed images in a distinctive so-called Coso style.

== See also ==
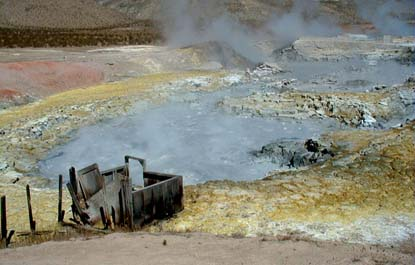
Remains of a wooden sweat lodge used by the Paiute and Timbisha people for healing rituals.

- Fossil Falls
- List of hot springs in the United States
- List of hot springs in the world
