= Granite Springs =

Granite Springs may refer to:

- Granite Springs, California, in Mariposa County
- Granite Springs, California, former name of Coso (former settlement), California, in Inyo County
- Granite Springs, New York
- Granite Springs Valley (Nevada), a Great Basin watershed
- Granite Springs, Virginia, in Spotsylvania County
