= Ridgecrest Petroglyph Festival =

The Ridgecrest Petroglyph Festival is an annual weekend-long festival held in Ridgecrest, California, celebrating the Coso people, and specifically the 10,000-year-old petroglyphs of the Coso Rock Art District. The festival was founded in 2014, and attracted over 15,000 guests in its first year and was named one of Groupon's "10 Most Unique Autumn Festivals in the Country". Events include an intertribal powwow, street fair, and guided tours to the local petroglyphs.

== Tours and events ==
The festival is focused on petroglyphs, with several tours throughout the weekend, organized by the Maturango Museum in Ridgecrest. Big and Little Petroglyph Canyons, the sites of the Coso petroglyphs, are located within the Naval Air Weapons Station China Lake, creating an undisturbed home for over 20,000 documented images.

Several tribes come together the weekend of the annual festival to be a part of the intertribal powwow held the same weekend. The 2014 festival featured a performance by famed Native American flautist R. Carlos Nakai (Navajo/Ute).

In 2014, a Petroglyph Park was created in Ridgecrest, featuring replicas of several of the famous petroglyphs in the area.

A virtual festival took place in 2020 due to the COVID-19 pandemic.
