= Eagleworks =

Eagle Works or Eagleworks or variation may refer to:

- Eagleworks Laboratories, also known as Advanced Propulsion Physics Laboratory, a small research group investigating a variety of theories regarding new forms of spacecraft propulsion at NASA's Johnson Space Center
- Eagle Salt Works Railroad, a defunct railway near Fernley, Nevada, United States
- Eagle Borax Works, a defunct borate mine in Death Valley, California, United States
- Eagle Ironworks, Oxford, United Kingdom

== See also ==
- Eagle (disambiguation)
- Eagle Ironworks (disambiguation)
