= Fossil Falls =

Archaeological site in California, United States

- Fossil Falls Archeological District
- U.S. National Register of Historic Places
- U.S. Historic district
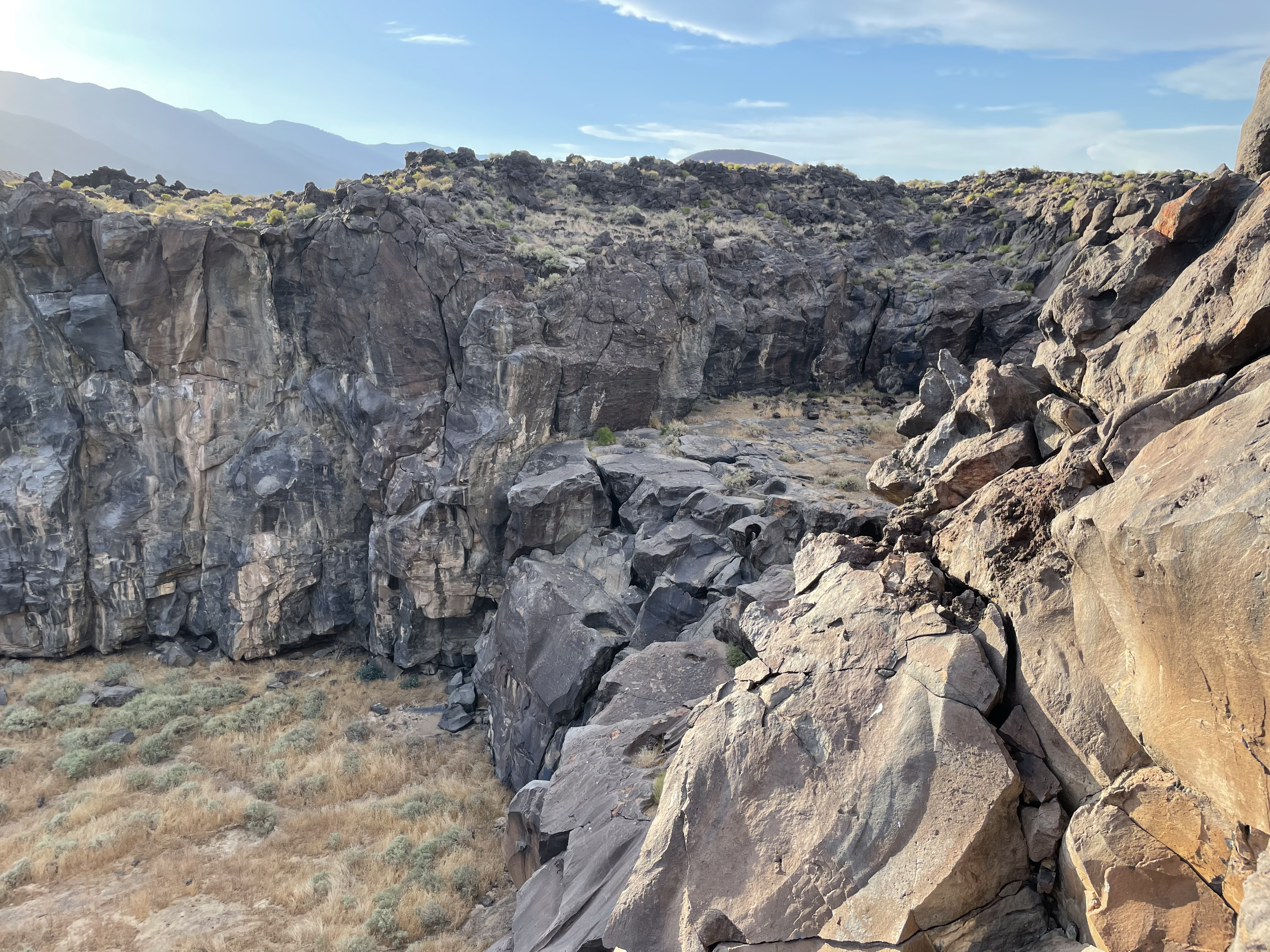
- 70ft main drop of the now extinct Fossil Falls

- Location within California Location within the United States
- Nearest city: Little Lake, California
- Coordinates: 35°58′12″N 117°54′32″W
- Area: 750 acres (300 ha)
- NRHP reference No.: 80004492
- Added to NRHP: July 09, 1980

The Fossil Falls is a geological feature located in the Coso Range in Inyo County, California. Volcanic activity in the mountain range, along with meltwater from glaciers in the nearby Sierra Nevada, played a role in the creation of the falls. They are located near the community of Little Lake, 1.0 mi (1.6 km) off US 395 (at a red cinder cone called "Red Hill") on Cinder Road to Red Hill, with signs to Fossil Falls.

== Geology ==
The name Fossil Falls is slightly misleading as there are neither fossils, nor waterfalls present. Rather the phenomena actually formed from lava from nearby volcanos, in addition to rushing water. During the last ice age, glaciers formed in the Sierra Nevada. Meltwater from the glaciers pooled into large lakes, including Owens Lake and the Owens River. The river traveled through to Indian Wells Valley, and its course was diverted several times by volcanic activity. The falls were formed when the river was forced to divert its course over a basalt flow, polishing and reshaping the rock into a variety of unique shapes and forms. The name actually stands as a symbol for the dried up waterfall itself. The word "fossil" means preserved remains or traces of an organism from a past geological age. In this case, the word fossil is highlighting the structure of the falls and how it represents the remains of the water and lava that once flowed through.

All the lava flows at Fossil Falls are basaltic. The Coso Volcanic Field brought flows from the northeast and later Red Hill, which can be viewed from Fossil Falls, released the younger lava. The flows occurred between 400,000 years ago and 10,000 years ago. During this period, the glacial flows would run through Fossil Falls and smooth the vesicular basalt. The erosion found at Fossil Falls was formed by the youngest glacial runoff, called the Tioga, from the Sierra Nevada Mountain Range about 20,000 to 10,000 years ago.

In addition to the small gas vesicles in the basalt, there are large, perfectly circular penetrations in the basalt. These are erosional features called potholes. It is speculated that Red Hill cast out granitic detritus which fell into Fossil Falls. Water accelerates as it moves past the rocks. The relatively still water ahead forced the moving water to slow down and rotate to form an eddy. The high-velocity currents were enough to catch the granitic rocks from Red Hill and spiral them downwards in multiple vortices, drilling them into the basalt. Sediments would get trapped and continue to circularly erode the holes.

Fossil Falls originally started downstream from where it sits today; it moved upstream as waterfalls typically do due to headwater erosion. Water falling over the edge of the waterfall undercut the falls and caused them to move upstream and grow taller. This process is called plunge-pool erosion.

== Native Americans near Fossil Falls ==
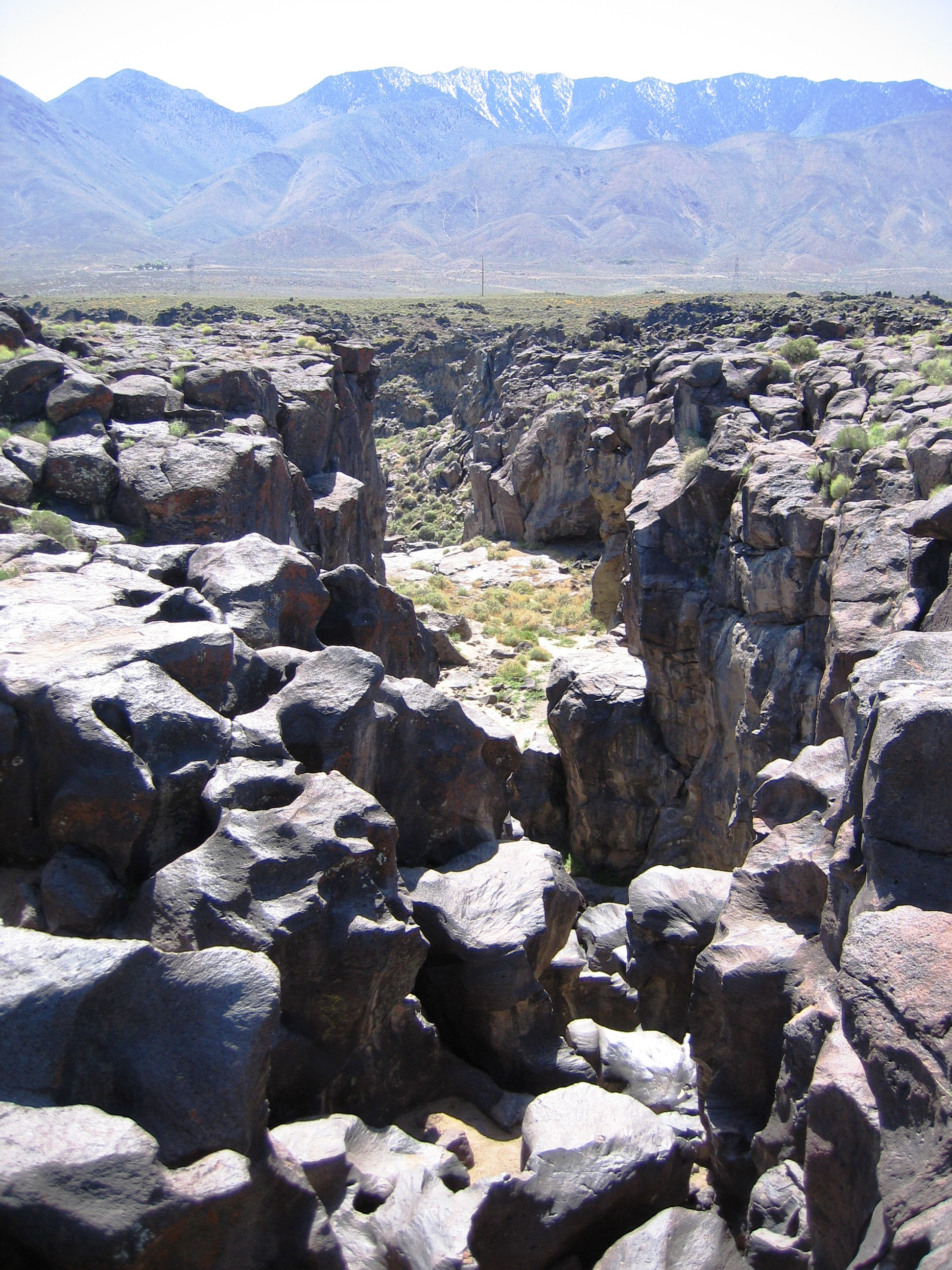
Bowls and smooth rocks formed by running water above the waterfall

Bands of Native Americans, such as the Coso People, lived in the region as early as ten to twenty thousand years ago, camping along the now dry river. They harvested resources and hunted the large animals which lived there at the time. By 6000 BCE, however, the lakes and rivers dried up and the large animals went extinct. This made living conditions challenging. These early inhabitants were forced to partially abandon the region. As conditions began to switch back to a relatively moderate climate at around 4000 BCE, Native Americans started to return to the area. They practiced a new culture, which emphasized using the resources available to them in the desert. The way of life that these people practiced survived until the 19th century, when the native tribe called the Little Lake Shoshone first made contact with Europeans.

Flakes of obsidian can be found in the area, for the Native Americans would camp near Fossil Falls and chip obsidian from the Coso Mountains to form their tools. The Fossil Falls Archeological District is on the National Register of Historic Places. Fossil Falls is protected as an area of Critical Environmental Concern by the Bureau of Land Management.

== See also ==
- Coso Rock Art District
- Coso Volcanic Field
- Category: Protected areas of the Mojave Desert
