= Indian Village, California =

Unincorporated community in California, United States

Indian Village Timbisha
- Unincorporated community
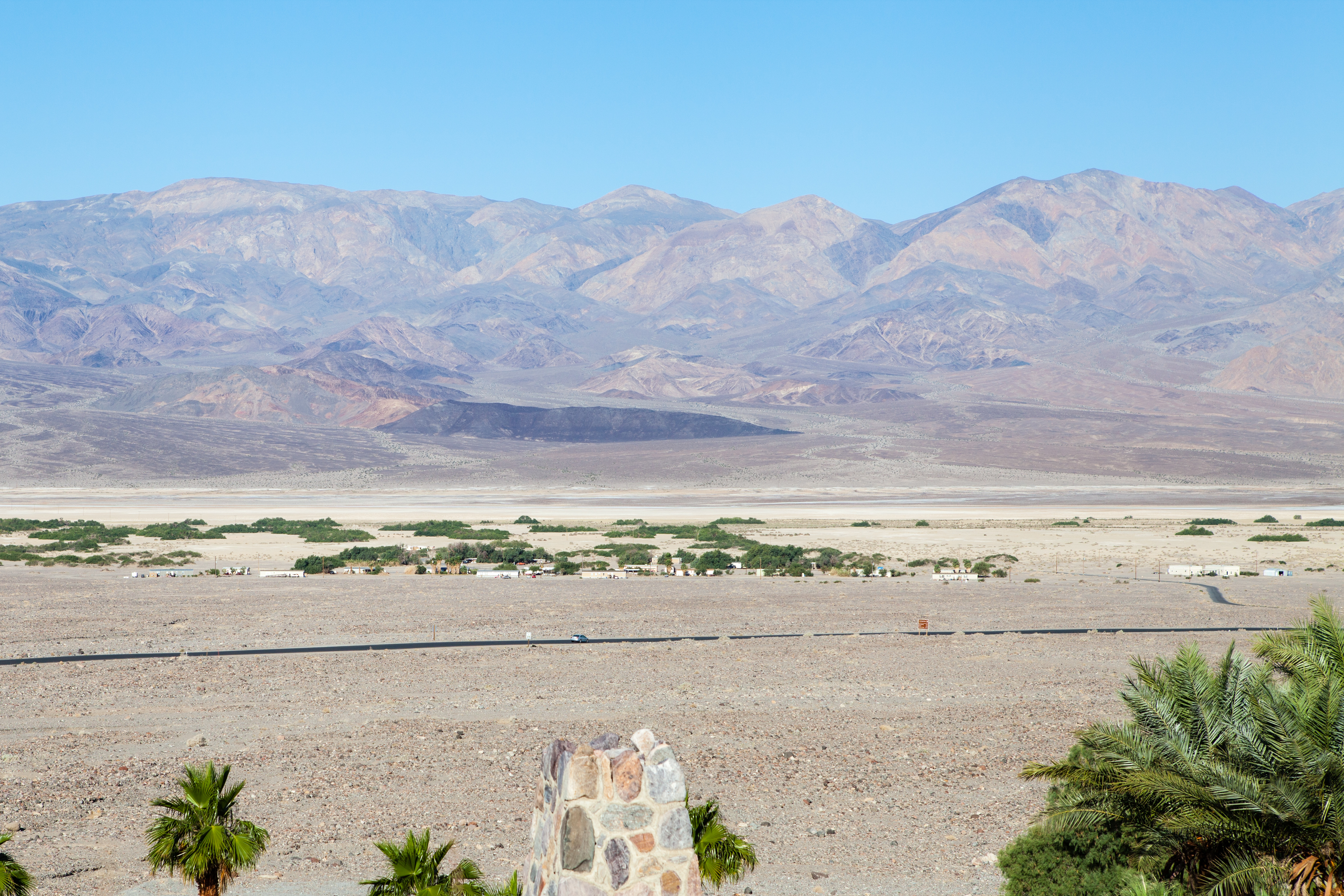
- Death Valley Indian Community, looking west toward the village from a hill one mile away across highway 190

- Location in California Indian Village (the United States)
- Coordinates: 36°26′57″N 116°52′27″W
- Country: United States
- State: California
- County: Inyo
- Location: Death Valley National Park
- Habitat: Furnace Creek oasis
- Elevation: −200 ft (−60 m)

Indian Village is an unincorporated community in Furnace Creek, Death Valley of Inyo County, California, United States.

Indian Village lies at an elevation of 197 feet (60 m) below sea level. Indian Village is located in the Death Valley Indian Community reservation of the Death Valley Timbisha Shoshone Band of California, within Death Valley National Park. Approximately 50 members of the tribe live in Indian Village.

After unsuccessful efforts to remove the band to nearby reservations, National Park Service officials entered into an agreement with Timbisha Shoshone tribal leaders to allow the CCC to construct an Indian village for tribal members near park headquarters at Furnace Creek in 1938.
