= Big and Little Petroglyph Canyons =

Archaeological site in California, United States

- U.S. National Register of Historic Places
- U.S. National Historic Landmark
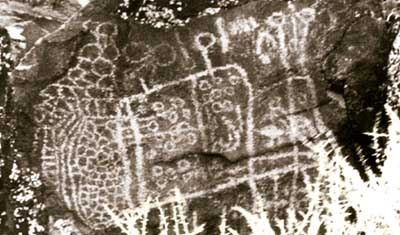
- Archaic abstract curvilinear-style petroglyphs by Coso People
- Nearest city: China Lake, California
- Area: Coso Rock Art District
- Artists: Coso People
- NRHP reference No.: 66000209

Significant dates
- Added to NRHP: October 15, 1966
- Designated NHL: July 19, 1964

Big and Little Petroglyph Canyons are two principal landforms within which are found major accumulations of Paleo-Indian and/or Native American Petroglyphs, or rock art, by the Coso People located in the Coso Range Mountains of the northern Mojave Desert, and now within the Naval Air Weapons Station China Lake, near the towns of China Lake and Ridgecrest, California. Little Petroglyph Canyon contains 20,000 documented images, which surpasses in number for most other collections. Additionally, the archeological resources are remarkably undisturbed.

== History ==
The Coso Petroglyphs have been subject to various interpretations as to their meaning and function. One perspective argues that the drawings are metaphoric images correlated with individual shamanic vision quests. Alternatively it has been argued that they are part of a hunting religion that included increase rites and were associated with a sheep cult ceremonial complex. However these alternative explanations might be somewhat complementary in that the medicine persons could have been the artisans but their messages might have often been associated with religious observances centering on the veneration of bighorn sheep.

In addition to the extant petroglyph rock art, the Coso People carried out extensive working of obsidian tools and other 'manufacturing.' There is considerable archaeological evidence substantiating trade of these products between the Coso People and other Indigenous peoples of the Americas and Native American tribes. For example, distant trade with the southern Californian Pacific coast Chumash People is confirmed by archaeological recovery from California sites in San Luis Obispo County, California and other coastal indigenous peoples' sites.

Big and Little Petroglyph Canyons are situated on property of the China Lake Naval Air Weapons Station. The two canyons are a designated U.S. National Historic Landmark. In 2001, they were incorporated into a larger National Historic Landmark District, called the Coso Rock Art District.

In 2014, the Ridgecrest Petroglyph Festival was created as an annual celebration and showcase the petroglyphs located in the two canyons.

== See also ==
- Paleo-Indians
- Mesoamerica
- Native Americans in the United States
- Population history of American indigenous peoples

== Resources ==
- Caroline Arnold and Richard Hewett. 1996. Stories in stone: rock art pictures by early Americans, 48 pages, Houghton Mifflin Harcourt, ISBN 0-395-72092-3, ISBN 978-0-395-72092-9
- C. Michael Hogan. 2008. Morro Creek, ed. by A. Burnham
- Mildred Brooke Hoover, Douglas E. Kyle and Hero Rensch. 2002. Historic spots in California, 661 pp, Stanford University Press, ISBN 0-8047-4482-3, ISBN 978-0-8047-4482-9
- Alan P. Garfinkel. 2006. Paradigm Shifts, Rock Art Studies, and the 'Coso Sheep Cult' of Eastern California. North American Archaeologist 27(3):203-244.
- Alan P. Garfinkel. 2007. Archaeology and Rock Art of the Eastern Sierra and Great Basin Frontier, Maturango Museum Publication 22, Ridgecrest, California.
- Alan P.Garfinkel, Donald R. Austin, David Earle, and Harold Williams. 2009. Myth, Ritual and Rock Art: Coso Decorated Animal-Humans and the Animal Master. Rock Art Research 26(2):179-197. The Journal of the Australian Rock Art Research Association (AURA) and of the International Federation of Rock Art Organizations (IFRAO).
- Alan P. Garfinkel, David A. Young, and Robert M. Yohe, II. 2010. Bighorn Hunting, Resource Depression, and Rock Art in the Coso Range of Eastern California: A Computer Simulation Model. Journal of Archaeological Science 37:42-51.
- Alan P.Garfinkel and Donald R. Austin. 2011. Reproductive Symbolism in Great Basin Rock Art: Bighorn Sheep Hunting, Fertility, and Forager Ideology. Cambridge Archaeological Journal, 21(3):453-471.
