= Maturango Museum =

Museum in Ridgecrest, California

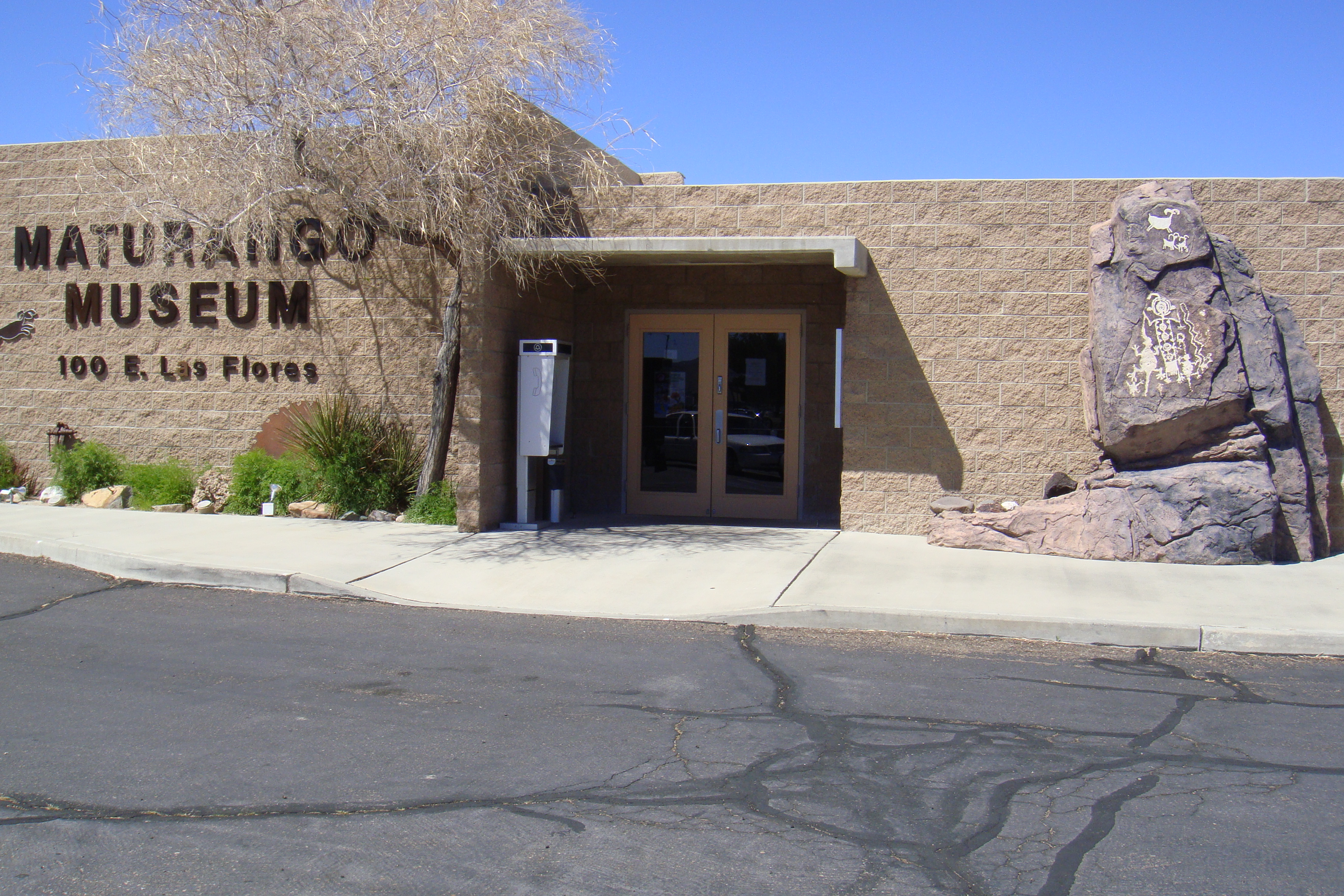
- The front of the Maturango Museum
- Established: 1962
- Location: 100 E. Las Flores Ave. Ridgecrest, CA
- Coordinates: 35.63041°N 117.66935°W
- Type: Cultural history, natural history and geology
- Director: Debbie Benson
- Website: www.maturango.org

Maturango Museum is located in Ridgecrest, California. The museum is best known for the guided tours of the Coso Rock Art District located on China Lake Naval Weapons Station, although due to restrictions from the base command, the petroglyphs are currently not available for public tours at this time. The museum offers exhibits and displays featuring both the natural and the cultural history and diversity of the Northern Mojave Desert with exhibits of animals, plants, rocks and minerals, Native American artifacts, and contemporary arts and crafts.

== Description ==
This small museum was founded in 1962 and originally designed to highlight the history of Ridgecrest and nearby China Lake. The museum was named after the highest peak in the close by Argus Range.

The town of Ridgecrest, where the museum is located, is surrounded by four mountain ranges: the Sierra Nevada on the west, the Cosos on the north, the Argus Range on the east, and the El Paso Mountains on the south. It is approximately 80 miles from the Lancaster/Palmdale area and approximately 115 miles (185 km) from both Bakersfield and San Bernardino, the three nearest major urban centers.

Since 2014, Debbie Benson has served as director of the museum.

== Research ==
The Maturango Museum curates collections from the local area and has an extensive collection of historic documents. The museum is also an archeological repository for qualified individuals and those individuals are able to request research for archeology, history, and natural history.

=== Collections ===
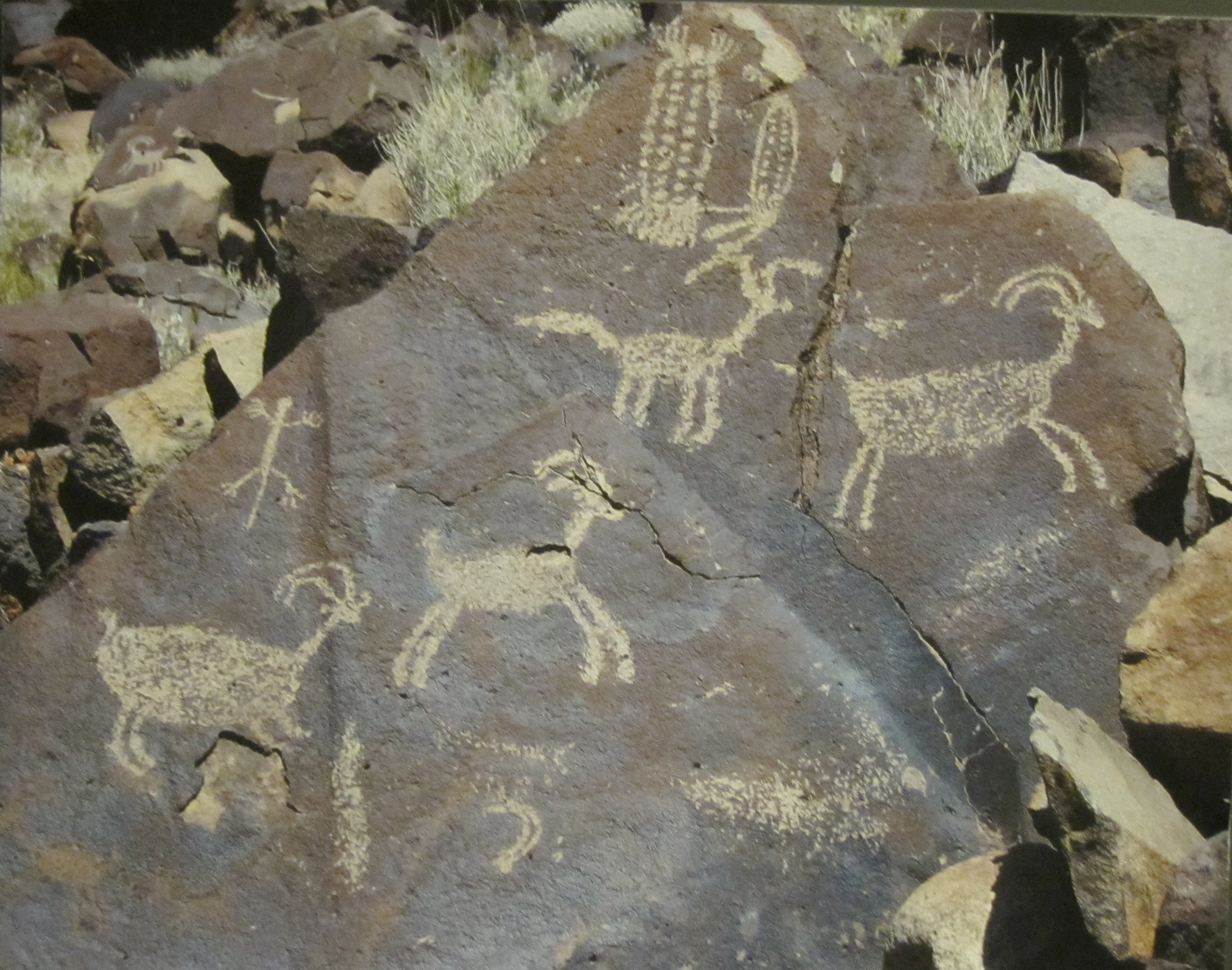
Types of petroglyphs researched by this museum.

This museum is a professional museum and curation facility that meets the Curation of Federally Owned Archeological Collections 36 C.F.R. Part 79 (2022) standards. The museum accepts and stores historic and prehistoric artifacts from the Upper Mojave Desert region, the west by the Sierra Nevada Mountains and Kern River Valley, the north by southern Inyo County, the south by Antelope Valley, and on the east by Death Valley and northwestern San Bernardino County.

=== Internships ===
Since 2013 the museum has offered internships for college and university students primarily during the summer. Interns are typically involved in analysis and cataloging of artifacts, researching specific topics related to the collections, designing and constructing exhibits, or conducting related analyses that benefit the museum. Students are generally history or archeology majors.

== See also ==
- List of museums in California
- Historic landmarks in California
- List of nature centers in California
- National Register of Historic Places listings in Kern County, California
- Ridgecrest Petroglyph Festival
