= LTV-N-4 =

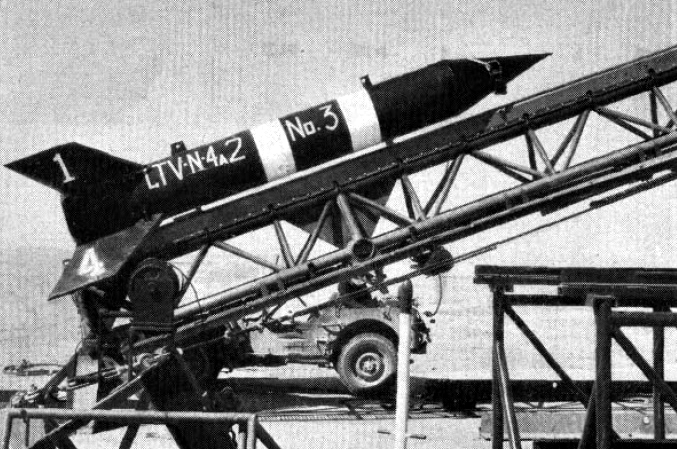
- Type: Experimental rocket
- Place of origin: United States

Service history
- In service: 1949
- Used by: United States Navy

Production history
- Designer: Naval Ordnance Test Station

Specifications
- Length: 15 feet (4.6 m)
- Engine: Solid-fuel rocket

The LTV-N-4 was an American experimental rocket, developed by the Naval Ordnance Test Station for the development and testing of large solid-fueled rocket boosters for ramjet-powered missiles. Described as "more powerful than the V-2", a number of test flights were conducted during 1949.
