= Coso Range Wilderness =

Protected wilderness area in California, United States

- IUCN category Ib (wilderness area)
- Location within California Location within the United States
- Location: Inyo County, California, United States
- Coordinates: 36.265794°N 117.850474°W
- Area: 49,296 acres (199.49 km^{2})
- Established: 1994
- Governing body: Bureau of Land Management

The Coso Range Wilderness is a protected wilderness area in California in the northern end of the Coso Range.

The area was designated as wilderness by the California Desert Protection Act of 1994 and contains Joshua trees, creosote, and cactus as well as old mining areas.

The wilderness is bounded to the south and east by Naval Air Weapons Station China Lake.
