= Eagle Ironworks =

Eagle Ironworks (or Eagle Iron Works) is a name used by a number of companies producing ironwork products.

It may refer to:

- Lucy's Eagle Ironworks, Oxford, England

== See also ==
- Eagleworks (disambiguation)
- Eagle (disambiguation)
