= Pawona Witu =

Archaeological site in California, United States

- U.S. National Register of Historic Places
- U.S. Historic district
- Nearest city: Bishop, California
- Area: 1,080 acres (440 ha)
- NRHP reference No.: 75000428
- Added to NRHP: October 14, 1975

Pawona Witu is an archeological site near Bishop in Inyo County, California that was listed on the National Register of Historic Places in 1975. The listing included 1,080 acres (440 ha). Its location is not disclosed. Archeological sites are often listed on the National Register for their potential to yield knowledge in the future.

According to The Indian Tribes of North America, a 1953 book by John R. Swanton (1873-1958), Pawona Witu was listed by Julian H. Steward (1902-1972) in 1933 as an Indian village site on Bishop Creek below Bishop, near Owens Valley.
