= Eagle Borax Works =

- U.S. National Register of Historic Places
- U.S. Historic district
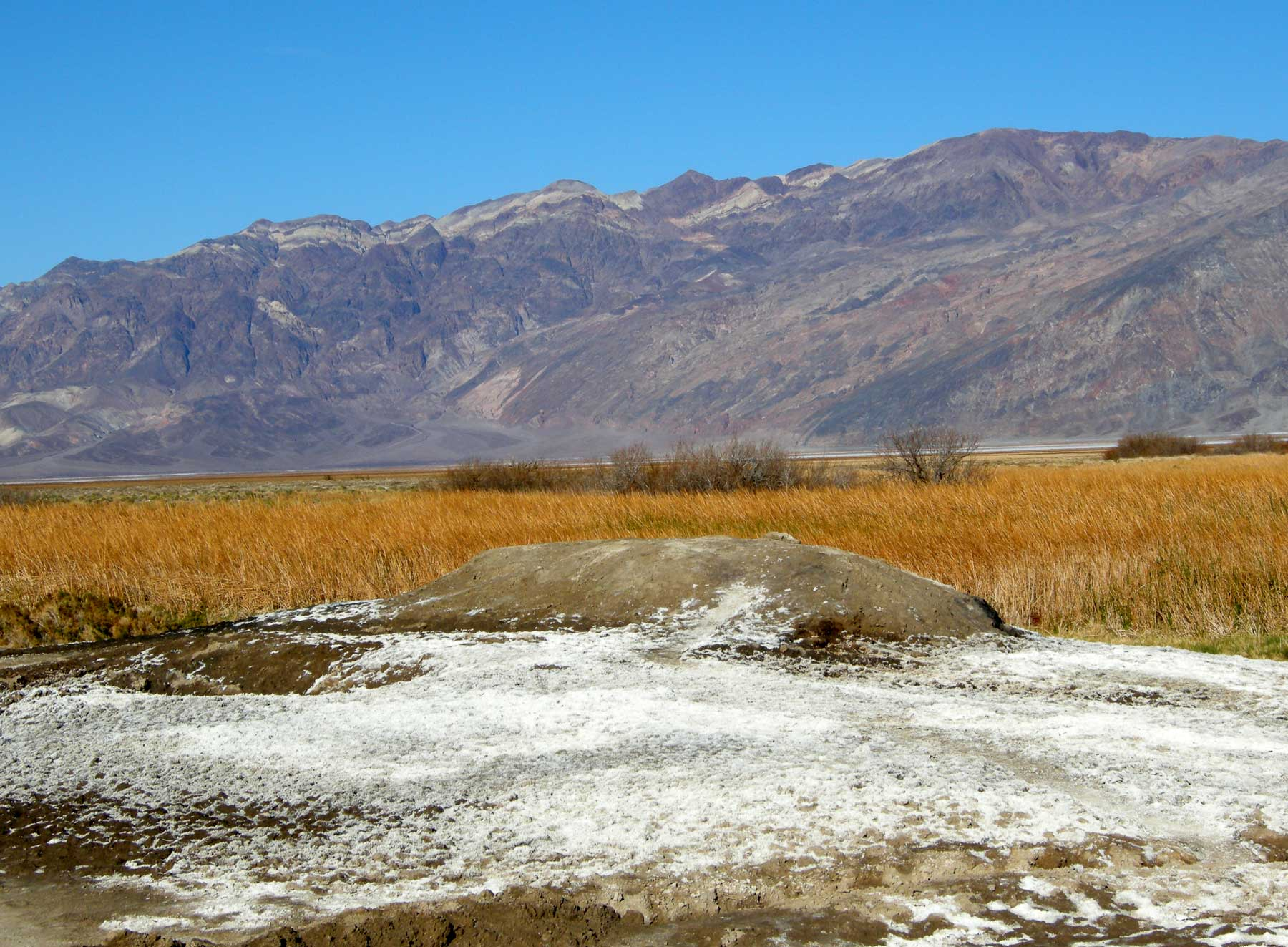
- Site of the Eagle Borax Works

- Location within California Location within the United States
- Location: Death Valley National Park, Furnace Creek, California
- Coordinates: 36°12′02.5″N 116°52′01.38″W
- Area: 54 acres (22 ha)
- Built: 1883
- NRHP reference No.: 74000338
- Added to NRHP: December 31, 1974

The Eagle Borax Works in Death Valley, California was established near Bennetts Well in 1882 by Isidore Daunet, J.M. McDonald, M. Harmon and C.C. Blanch to mine the borate deposits that Daunet discovered there in 1880. The partnership established the first borax works in the valley. Partly refined borax was hauled to Daggett, California through the Panamint Valley using 12-mule teams hauling two wagons. The extraction business operated until 1884 when problems mounted and Daunet killed himself. The property eventually passed to the U.S. Borax Company, which kept it as a mining reserve, then to Borax Consolidated, Ltd. in 1922. The property was sold to the Death Valley Hotel Company in 1956, and finally to the National Park Service.

Little remains of the structures but ruins. The works originally included a boiler, a tank for dissolved borax, and open tanks for crystallization of the borax. A stone building stood nearby to house the workers. The boiler fire box remains, along with an earth mound at the site of the building.

== Isidore Daunet ==
Isidore Daunet (1850–1884) was a French emigrant to the United States, who arrived at the age of ten, coming to San Francisco and becoming a prospector at the age of 13. Daunet discovered the borax deposit during a disastrous 1880 crossing of Death Valley, in which three of his companions died, and Daunet survived only by killing one of the party's animals and drinking its blood. After establishing the borax company in 1882, he fell into business trouble. His wife gave notice of her intention to divorce him, and Daunet was swindled out of $11,000. He committed suicide in May 1884.

The site of the borax works was listed on the National Register of Historic Places on December 31, 1974. The site is within Death Valley National Park.

== "The Lost Chinaman" ==
Eugene L. Conrotto, in his book, "Lost Gold and Silver Mines of the Southwest" recalls a tale told by "Shorty" Harris (a resident prospector of Death Valley) of a disgruntled Chinese immigrant worker of the Eagle Borax Works, who allegedly found a fabulously rich gold vein entrapped in a 15-pound rock sample while traversing through the Panamint Mountains on the Death Valley's western edge.

== See also ==
- Harmony Borax Works, a more intact example of a borax works, also in Death Valley
