= China Lake, Kern County, California =

Unincorporated community in California, United States

China Lake
- Unincorporated community
- Location in California China Lake (the United States)
- Coordinates: 35°39′3″N 117°39′42″W
- Country: United States
- State: California
- County: Kern
- Elevation: 2,260 ft (690 m)

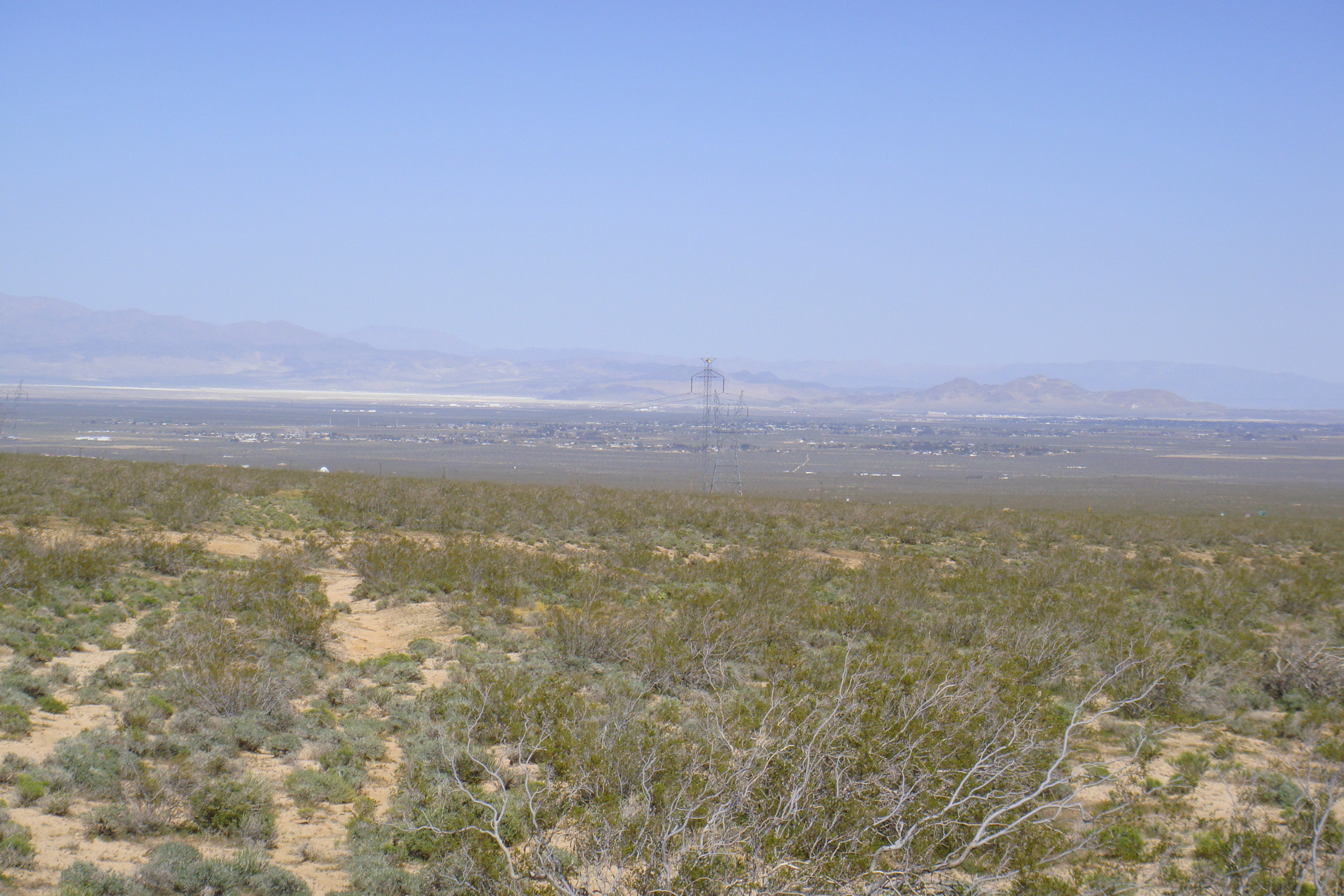
Indian Wells Valley, showing Ridgecrest, California and the China Lake area.

China Lake is an unincorporated community in Kern County, California, United States. It is located 2.5 miles (4 km) north-northeast of Ridgecrest, at an elevation of 2,264 feet (690 m). The place is on China Lake, a dry lake near the Naval Air Weapons Station China Lake.

The first post office at China Lake opened in 1948.

== History ==
=== Prehistory ===
The locale was originally settled by the Coso People, who were prolific artisans in creating rock art. The Coso left archaeological evidence substantiating trade between the Coso and other Native American tribes. For example, distant trade with the Chumash People is confirmed by archaeological recovery of obsidian that has been linked to the Cosos and was discovered as far away as coastal California prehistoric sites in San Luis Obispo County.

=== Early 1900s (origin of name) ===
Chinese prospectors harvested borax from the dry lake bed approximately 1.5 miles south of Paxton Ranch. The operation was known locally as "The Little Chinese Borax Works". This led to the area being called China Lake.

== Climate ==
The area around China Lake has a hot desert climate (BWh) typical of the Mojave Desert with very hot, dry summers and cool winters. Most rain falls in the winter.

Climate data for China Lake, California, 1991–2020 normals, extremes 1945–present
Month	Jan	Feb	Mar	Apr	May	Jun	Jul	Aug	Sep	Oct	Nov	Dec	Year
Record high °F (°C)	89 (32)	91 (33)	92 (33)	104 (40)	109 (43)	118 (48)	119 (48)	119 (48)	114 (46)	103 (39)	93 (34)	81 (27)	119 (48)
Mean maximum °F (°C)	72.6 (22.6)	76.6 (24.8)	85.1 (29.5)	93.5 (34.2)	101.5 (38.6)	109.3 (42.9)	112.5 (44.7)	110.9 (43.8)	105.7 (40.9)	95.6 (35.3)	82.0 (27.8)	71.0 (21.7)	113.6 (45.3)
Mean daily maximum °F (°C)	60.1 (15.6)	64.6 (18.1)	71.9 (22.2)	78.7 (25.9)	88.2 (31.2)	98.5 (36.9)	104.6 (40.3)	103.3 (39.6)	95.2 (35.1)	82.7 (28.2)	69.4 (20.8)	59.5 (15.3)	81.4 (27.4)
Daily mean °F (°C)	45.5 (7.5)	50.0 (10.0)	56.9 (13.8)	63.1 (17.3)	71.8 (22.1)	81.1 (27.3)	87.5 (30.8)	85.9 (29.9)	77.8 (25.4)	65.6 (18.7)	53.1 (11.7)	44.9 (7.2)	65.3 (18.5)
Mean daily minimum °F (°C)	30.8 (−0.7)	35.4 (1.9)	41.8 (5.4)	47.4 (8.6)	55.5 (13.1)	63.7 (17.6)	70.4 (21.3)	68.6 (20.3)	60.5 (15.8)	48.5 (9.2)	36.8 (2.7)	30.3 (−0.9)	49.1 (9.5)
Mean minimum °F (°C)	20.3 (−6.5)	24.4 (−4.2)	29.9 (−1.2)	34.5 (1.4)	44.8 (7.1)	51.0 (10.6)	60.9 (16.1)	58.4 (14.7)	48.9 (9.4)	37.0 (2.8)	24.9 (−3.9)	18.9 (−7.3)	16.8 (−8.4)
Record low °F (°C)	6 (−14)	12 (−11)	21 (−6)	27 (−3)	35 (2)	42 (6)	50 (10)	51 (11)	39 (4)	20 (−7)	16 (−9)	8 (−13)	6 (−14)
Average precipitation inches (mm)	0.94 (24)	1.11 (28)	0.55 (14)	0.24 (6.1)	0.10 (2.5)	0.07 (1.8)	0.12 (3.0)	0.11 (2.8)	0.24 (6.1)	0.27 (6.9)	0.38 (9.7)	0.54 (14)	4.67 (118.9)
Source 1: NOAA
Source 2: National Weather Service
