= Coso Rock Art District =

Historic district in California, United States

- U.S. National Register of Historic Places
- U.S. National Historic Landmark District
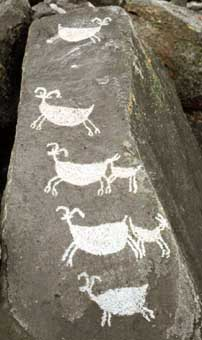
- Bighorn sheep, a characteristic design at Coso

- Location within California Location within the United States
- Location: Mojave Desert, Coso Range, Big and Little Petroglyph Canyons
- Nearest city: China Lake, California
- NRHP reference No.: 99001178

Significant dates
- Added to NRHP: October 8, 1999
- Designated NHLD: July 8, 2001

Coso Rock Art District is a rock art site containing over 100,000 Petroglyphs by Paleo-Indians and/or Native Americans. The district is located near the towns of China Lake and Ridgecrest, California. Big and Little Petroglyph Canyons were declared a National Historic Landmark in 1964. In 2001, they were incorporated into this larger National Historic Landmark District. There are several other distinct canyons in the Coso Rock Art District besides the Big and Little Petroglyph Canyons. Also known as Little Petroglyph Canyon and Sand Tanks, Renegade Canyon is but one of several major canyons in the Coso Range, each hosting thousands of petroglyphs (other locations include Haiwee Springs, Dead End Canyon, and Sheep Canyon). The majority of the Coso Range images fall into one of six categories: bighorn sheep, entopic images, anthropomorphic or human-like figures (including animal-human figures known as pattern-bodied anthropomorphs), other animals, weapons & tools, and "medicine bag" images. Scholars have proposed a few potential interpretations of this rock art. The most prevalent of these interpretations is that they could have been used for rituals associated with hunting.

Most of the Coso Range is on the Naval Air Weapons Station China Lake, where visitation is restricted, vandalism is low, and preservation is most likely. The Coso Range is between the Sierra Nevada and the Argus Range. Indian Wells Valley lies to the south of this location. This north-south trending range of about 400 square miles (1,000 km^{2}) consists of rhyolitic domes and outcrops of volcanic rock. The most popular subjects are bighorn sheep, deer, and antelope.

A November 2007 Los Angeles Times' Travel feature article includes it within a top 15 list of California places to visit. The area was also mentioned in Groupon's "10 Most Unique Autumn Festivals in the Country" as a part of the Ridgecrest Petroglyph Festival.

== Prehistory detail ==
According to that article: "No one knows for sure who decorated Little Petroglyph Canyon with images out of a dreamscape, some thought to be more than 10,000 years old. Or why the basalt walls of a narrow wash in the bone-dry Coso Mountains at the northern edge of the Mojave Desert became a magic canvas for flocks of bighorn sheep, hunters with bows and arrows poised and more. But the area is probably the richest Amerindian Petroglyph / rock-art site in the Western Hemisphere. To see the canyon, one must contact either the Navy Base, or join a scheduled tour offered by Maturango Museum in Ridgecrest, California or attend a Rock Art 101 program. A 40-mile drive on paved road except for the last 6 miles to access the trailhead, followed by a hike and a scramble along the canyon. Visits are scheduled only in the spring and fall."

There is considerable archaeological evidence substantiating trade between the Coso People, possibly of the Northern Utoaztecan affiliation Paiute tribe, and other Indigenous peoples of the Americas and Native American tribes. For example, distant trade with the Chumash People is confirmed by archaeological recovery from coastal California sites in San Luis Obispo County and in prehistoric sites on the Channel Islands.

== See also ==
- Coso People
- Paleo-Indians
- Mesoamerica
- Native Americans in the United States
- Population history of American indigenous peoples
