= Coso Range =

Mountain range in Inyo County, California, United States

- Location within California

Highest point
- Elevation: 2,038 m (6,686 ft)

Geography
- Country: United States
- State: California
- District: Inyo County
- Range coordinates: 36°8′29.796″N 117°41′23.252″W
- Topo map: USGS Coso Peak

The Coso Range of eastern California is located immediately south of Owens Lake, east of the Sierra Nevada, and west of the Argus Range. The southern part of the range lies in the restricted Naval Air Weapons Station China Lake and the northern part of the range is designated as the Coso Range Wilderness. The mountains include Coso Peak, at 8,160 feet (2,487 m) above sea level, as well as Silver Peak and Silver Mountain, both more than 7,400 ft (2,300 m) in height.

The range is underlain principally by Mesozoic granitic rocks that are partly veneered by upper Cenozoic volcanic rocks of the Coso Volcanic Field. The volcanic units (in apparent decreasing age) include (1) widespread basaltic flows, (2) dacitic flows and tuff, and (3) rhyolitic domes and flows and basaltic cones and flows. These volcanic rocks are encompassed by an oval-shaped zone of late Cenozoic ring faulting that measures about 24 miles (39 km) east to west and 28 miles (45 km) north to south and that defines a structural basin. Most of the Coso Range and a slice of the adjacent Sierra Nevada lie within this ring structure. The youngest volcanic rocks are Pleistocene and, with associated active fumaroles, occupy a north-trending structural and topographic ridge about 11.2 by 6.2 miles (18 by 10 km) near the center of the basin. The ring structure and associated volcanic rocks suggest a large underlying magma chamber that has periodically erupted lava to the surface during the past few million years.

== Prehistory ==
Numerous rock art sites (the Coso Rock Art District) are found in the range, left by the ancient Coso people. The prehistoric Coso inhabitants exported volcanic glass (Coso obsidian) and this highly valued toolstone has been found as far distant as the Channel Islands of California. Little Petroglyph Canyon and Renegade Canyon within the Range are open for guided tours through the Maturango Museum in Ridgecrest, California.

== See also ==
- Fossil Falls
- List of mountain ranges of California
- Mountain ranges of the Mojave Desert
