= Timbisha =

Native American tribe of the California-Nevada border

Total population
- 124 (2010 census)

Regions with significant populations
- United States (California, Death Valley region)

Languages
- English; Timbisha

Related ethnic groups
- Shoshone and Comanche

Timbisha (tümpisa) "Rock Paint"
- Person: Nümü
- People: Nümü Tümpisattsi
- Language: Nümü Nangkawih
- Country: Tupippuh Nümü

The Timbisha ("rock paint", Timbisha language: Nümü Tümpisattsi) are a Native American tribe federally recognized as the Death Valley Timbisha Shoshone Band of California. They are known as the Timbisha Shoshone Tribe and are located in south central California, near the Nevada border. As of the 2010 Census the population of the Village was 124. The older members still speak the ancestral language, also called Timbisha.

== History ==
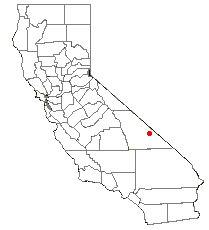
Furnace Creek, Death Valley, California

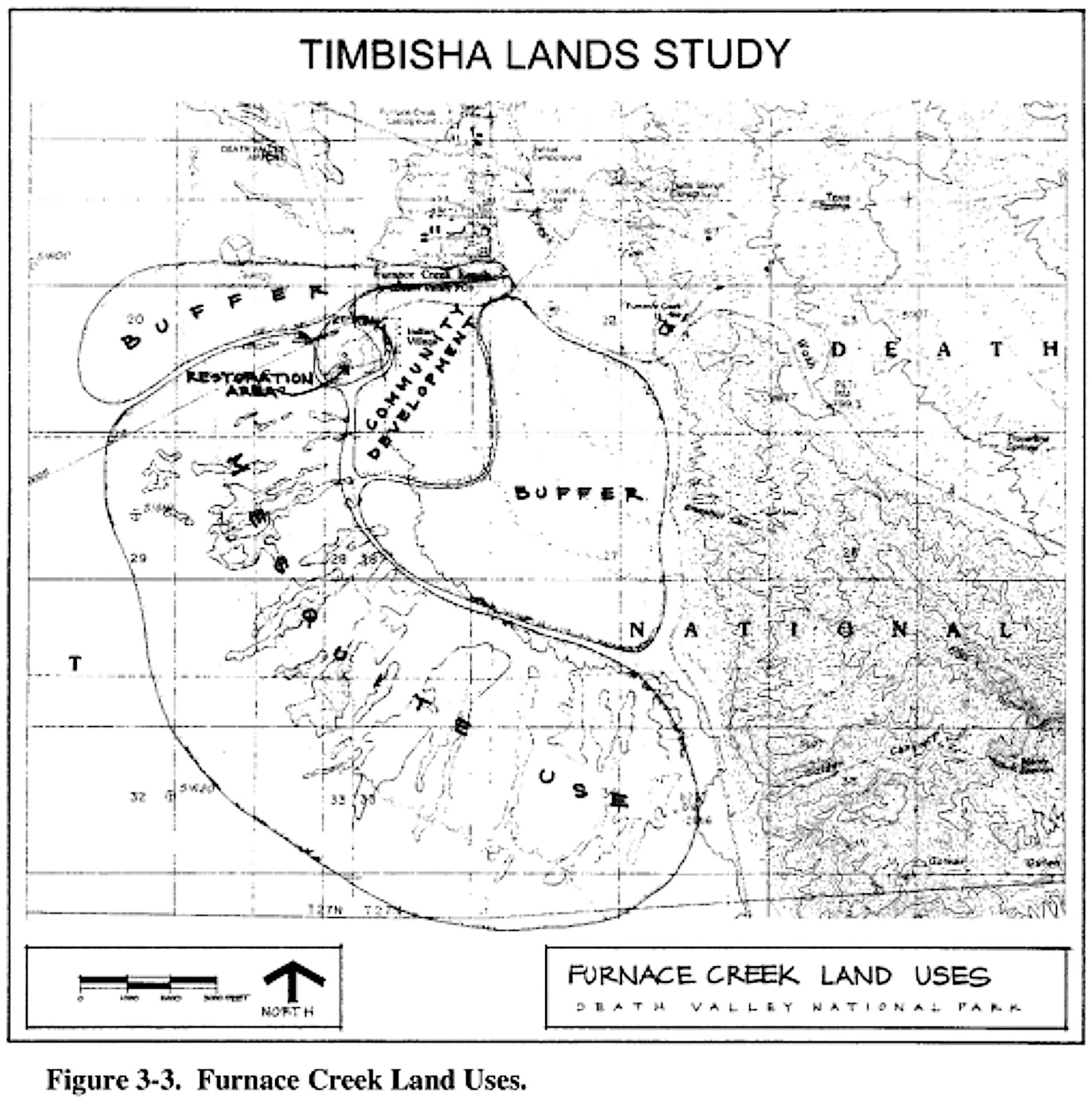
Timbisha Shoshone History

The Timbisha have lived in the Death Valley region of North America for over a thousand years. They were originally known as Panamints, as was their Uto-Aztecan language. The band traditionally was very small in size, and linguists estimate that fewer than 200 individuals ever spoke Panamint Shoshone. Estimates for the pre-contact populations of most Native groups in present day California have varied substantially. (See Population of Native California.) Alfred L. Kroeber put the combined 1770 population of the Timbisha (Koso) and Chemehuevi at 1,500. He estimated the population of the Timbisha and Chemehuevi in 1910 as 500. Julian Steward's figures for Eastern California are about 65 persons in Saline Valley, 150-160 persons in Little Lake (springs) and the Coso Range, about 100 in northern Panamint Valley, 42 in northern Death Valley, 29 at Beatty, and 42 in the Belted Range.

Archaeological evidence substantiates trade between the Coso People and other Native American tribes. For example, they traded with the Chumash people, then located in present-day Ventura, Santa Barbara, and San Luis Obispo counties. This was confirmed by archaeological recovery of a kind of obsidian, which has been chemically fingerprinted as belonging to the Coso culture and territory, but was discovered in coastal California prehistoric sites in San Luis Obispo County, California.

=== Post-contact ===
Euro-Americans first made contact with the Timbisha Shoshone during the California Gold Rush of 1849, but whites quickly moved on to the gold fields, renaming the Shoshone homeland Death Valley. Sustained contact occurred during the 1860s through the 1880s, when a stream of ranchers, miners, and homesteaders migrated to Death Valley, patenting the few springs and fertile plots of land in Death Valley. White settlers, using their knowledge of law, gained title to the Valley's scarce water and other resources, pushing the Shoshones to inferior lands. Shoshones were prohibited from using springs, while the settler's livestock destroyed plants necessary for tribal subsistence. Aboriginal lands taken from the band now include the Furnace Creek Inn and surrounding golf course. The federal government failed to recognize the Timbisha Shoshone as a tribe, and like many small rancheria bands in California, it also failed to protect the Shoshone's rights as Indigenous peoples. Belatedly, the Bureau of Indian Affairs did help Hungry Bill patent 160 acres of land in a canyon bordering Death Valley in 1908. The agency later secured an allotment of land for Robert Thompson at Warm Springs in Death Valley. In 1928, federal Indian agents also created a small rancheria, "Indian Ranch" to the east of Death Valley for Timbisha Shoshone Panamint Bill and his extended family. Though band members lacked federal acknowledgment of their tribal or Indigenous status, several Timbisha Shoshone attended the federal Sherman and Carson Indian Boarding Schools during the early twentieth century.

=== Creation of Death Valley National Monument ===
In 1933 President Herbert Hoover created Death Valley National Monument, an action that subsumed the tribe's homeland within park boundaries. Despite their long-time presence in the region, the proclamation failed to provide a homeland for the Timbisha people. After unsuccessful efforts to remove the band to nearby reservations, National Park Service officials entered into an agreement with tribal leaders to allow the Civilian Conservation Corps to construct an Indian village for tribal members near park headquarters at Furnace Creek in 1938. Thereafter tribal members survived within monument boundaries, although their status was repeatedly challenged by monument officials. They also lived in the Great Basin Saline Valley and northern Mojave Desert Panamint Valley areas of present-day southeastern California. The Death Valley south of Furnace Creek, California, and the Panamint Valley south of Ballarat, California were predominantly "Desert Kawaiisu", the adjoining areas to the north were composed of almost equal numbers of Timbisha (Panamint) Shoshone and "Desert Kawaiisu" (Julian Steward, 1938). Significantly, when borderlands were occupied, it was in fact common that settlements would include people speaking related but different languages.

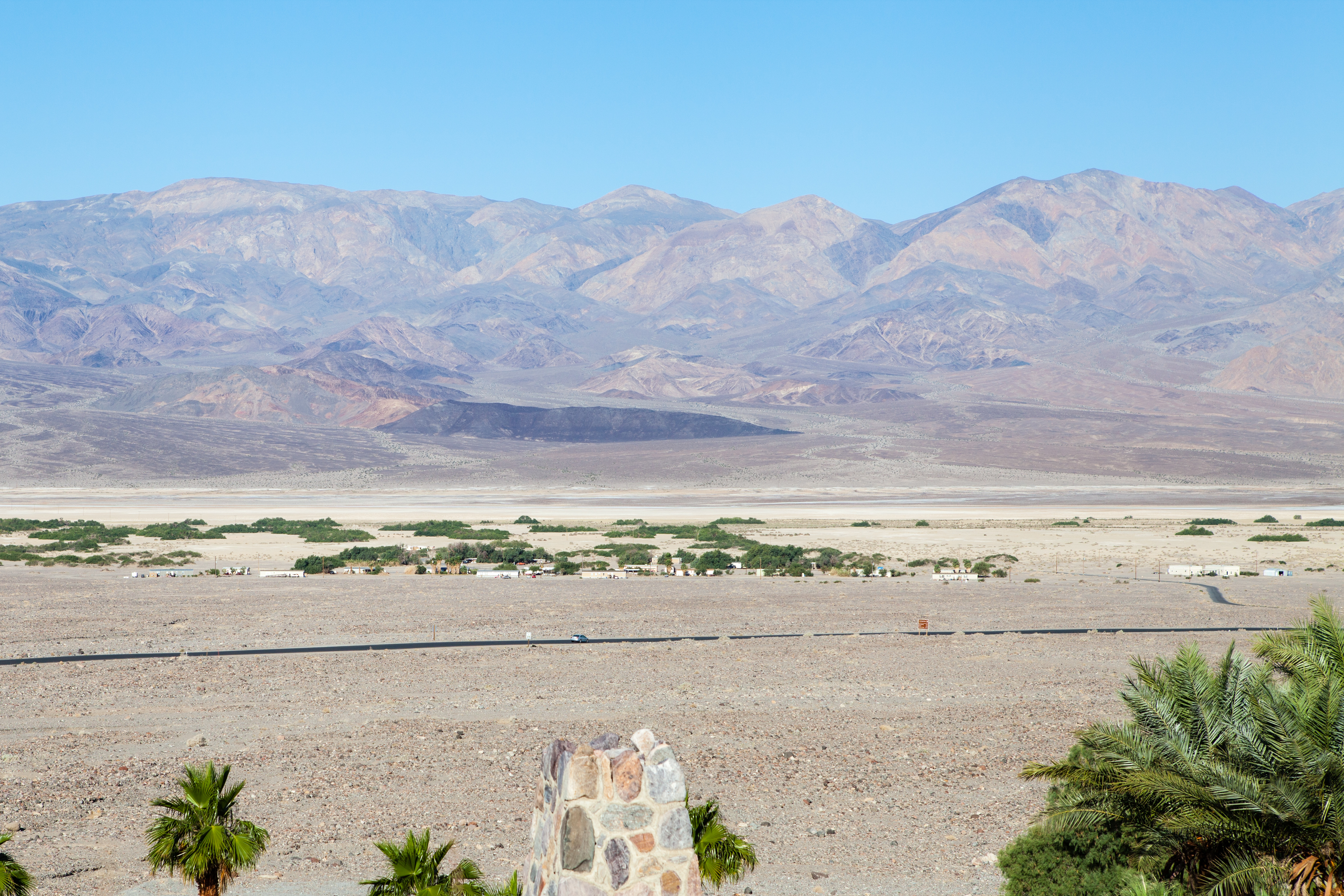
Death Valley Indian Community, looking west toward the village from a hill one mile away across highway 190

The decade of the 1950s was the height of the federal "Termination Era" when Congress sought to end its relationship with Indigenous tribes by terminating their governments and trust protected tribal lands. During this period, National Park Service officials began efforts to evict the Shoshones from Indian Village. The service had previously forbidden Shoshones from continuing their traditional subsistence practices, including gathering firewood, plants, and hunting within Monument boundaries. It prohibited them from using sacred places in the park to conduct traditional sacred ceremonies as well. While the adobe houses at Indian Village were adequate when built by the CCC in the 1930s, by mid-century they were in dilapidated condition. An electric line ran a mere 300 feet from the village, but the Park Service did not fund an extension of the line to Indigenous homes. The houses lacked electricity, air conditioning, indoor plumbing and running water. Using these conditions as a rationale, in 1957 the Park Service began a de facto removal policy for the Timbisha Shoshones still living in Indian Village. It began collecting rents, and evicting people when they failed to pay. It also limited occupancy to current residents and their relatives. Through these policies park officials hoped that the village would eventually die out. Many Shoshone men already had to move away for jobs in nearby Beatty, Nevada, or to cities in California. Existing correspondence reveals that white officials could not comprehend why Shoshones would choose to remain in such conditions. They did not understand their deep spiritual and ancestral attachment to the land. In 1958, Congress terminated "Indian Ranch", the enclave established for Panamint Bill earlier in the century and a place where some Timbisha Shoshone continued to reside.

At the time, Pauline Esteves, a tribal member, began fighting the National Park Service's eviction plan at Indian Village in Death Valley National Monument. Residents of the village consisted primary of elderly Shoshone women of the Boland, Kennedy, Watterson, Shoshone, and Esteves families. Only about twenty to twenty-five individuals resided there full time. Some worked for the Park Service or at area hotels, but most were unemployed. By the late 1960s the Park Service began destroying Indian Village houses once residents had failed to pay rents or had stayed away for long periods; it did so by using high powered hoses to wash down the adobe casitas. Seeing this, Esteves began organizing her people to fight the Monument's actions. She contacted California Indian Legal Services, one of the Indigenous rights organizations emerging during the decade. In 1975 the Native American Rights Fund (NARF) took the Timbisha Shoshone legal case. NARF attorneys were able to organize Esteves' people as a group of Indians with at least one-half degree Indian blood under the Indian Reorganization Act of 1934. Presented by tribal member Alice Eben in 1977, the Bureau of Indian Affairs approved the petition. The formal recognition gave the band certain rights and powers in fighting against Park Service eviction. The next year, Pauline Esteves entered into an agreement with the Indian Health Service and the National Park Service for a domestic water supply for the village. The band was able to secure a Bureau of Indian Affairs loan for several trailers to replace the decaying casitas at the village. During this time, the Park Service resisted efforts by tribal members to build permanent houses at the site. The band still did not own the land they lived on, and Park Service leaders feared creating a precedent if they surrendered any land to Indigenous claimants. In 1979, with help from NARF, the Timbisha Shoshone band wrote and presented a petition for full federal tribal acknowledgment to the Bureau of Indian Affairs.

=== Tribal recognition ===
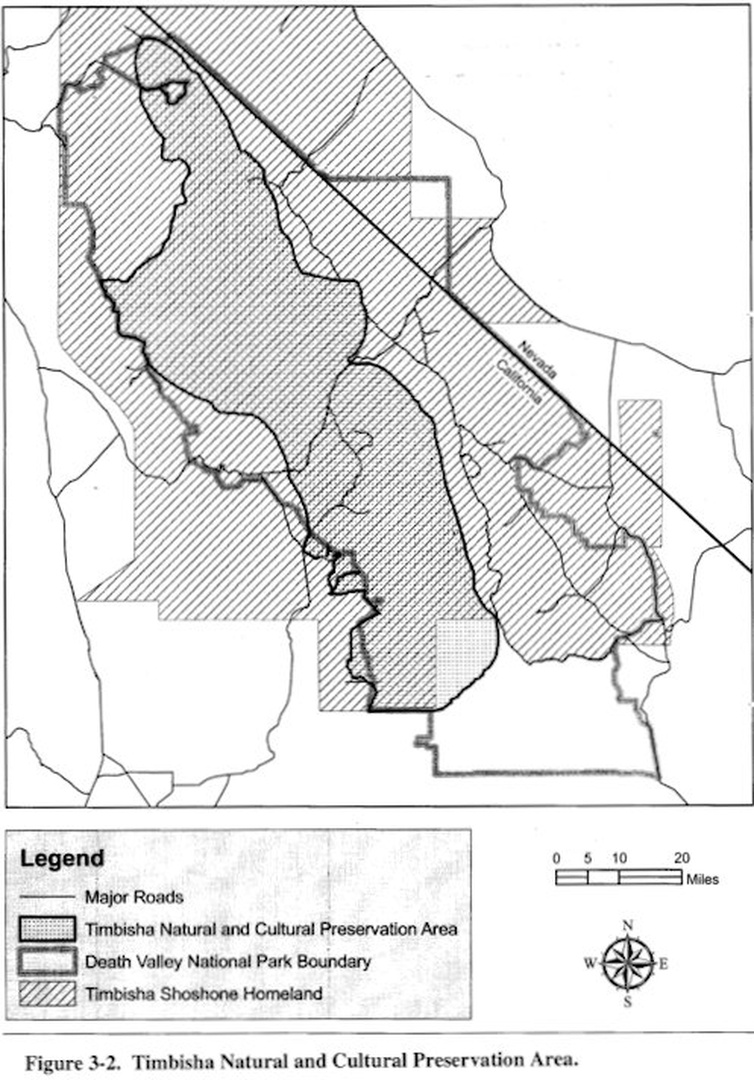
U.S. NPS 2009 Map

With the help of the California Indian Legal Services, Timbisha Shoshone members led by Pauline Esteves and Barbara Durham began agitating for a formal reservation in the 1960s. The Timbisha Shoshone Tribe was recognized by the US government in 1982. In this effort, they were one of the first tribes to secure tribal status through the Bureau of Indian Affairs' Federal Acknowledgment Process. The tribe's reservation, the Death Valley Indian Community, was established at this time. At first, the reservation consisted of the original 40 acre tract set aside for Indian Village. Located within Death Valley National Park at Furnace Creek in Death Valley, Inyo County, California. In 1990, the reservation remained only 40 acres (0.16 km^{2}) in size and had a population of 199 tribal member residents.

Despite their federal tribal recognition and diminutive 1982 reservation, the Timbisha still faced difficulty and conflict with the Death Valley National Park's National Park Service in regaining more of their ancestral lands within the Park. After much tribal effort, federal politics, and mutual compromise, the Timbisha Shoshone Homeland Act of 2000 finally returned 7,500 acres (30 km^{2}) of ancestral homelands to the Timbisha Shoshone tribe.

=== Present day ===
Currently the Timbisha Shoshone Tribe consists of around 300 members, usually 50 of whom live at the Death Valley Indian Community at Furnace Creek within Death Valley National Park. Many members spend the summers at Lone Pine in the Owens Valley to the west.

== Tribal name and groups ==
The Timbisha Shoshone (Tümpisa Shoshoni) have been known as the California Shoshoni, Death Valley Shoshone, Panamint Shoshone or simply Panamint. Coso, Koso, and Koso Shoshone (probably a derivative of Koosotsi - ″People from Coso Hot Springs area″ are names of one local group of the Little Lake Band).

The Timbisha of Death Valley called themselves Nümü Tümpisattsi (″Death Valley People″; literally: ″People from the Place of red ochre (face) paint)″) after the locative term for Death Valley which was named after an important red ochre source for paint that can be made from a type of clay found in the Golden Valley a little south of Furnace Creek, California known as "Tümpisa", Tümpisakka, Tümpisakkatün" (Tümpisa - "rock (ochre) paint" - from tün/tümpin - ″rock, stone″ plus pisappüh/pisappin - ″red ochre, red (face) paint)″ + locative postposition -ka - ″at, on" + nominal suffix - tün). Sometimes they used even Tsakwatan Tükkatün (″Chuckwalla Eaters″) as a self designation (actually pejorative term which is a loan translation from the Mono people for the Timbisha Shoshone).

However, they simply called themselves Nümü ("Person" or ″People″).

The Kawaiisu (and other Indian tribes south of Timbisha territory) were known as Mukunnümü (″Hummingbird people″), their northern neighbors, the Eastern Mono (Owens Valley Paiute) were called Kwinawetün ("north place people"), the Western Mono beyond the Sierra Nevada crest to the northwest were called Panawe ("western people"), and their direct western neighbors, the Tübatulabal were known as Waapi(ttsi) ("enemy"). The Yokuts (and other Indian tribes on the western side of the Sierras) were known as Toyapittam maanangkwa nümü ("people on the other (western) side of Sierras"). Their Western and Northern Shoshone kin were called Sosoniammü Kwinawen (Kuinawen) Nangkwatün Nümü ("Shoshoni speaking northwards people"). In the Indian Entities Recognized and Eligible To Receive Services From the United States Bureau of Indian Affairs periodically listed in the Federal Register, their name is presented as "Timbi-Sha", but this is a typographical error and ungrammatical in Timbisha. The tribe never hyphenates its name. Both the California Desert Protection Act and the Timbisha Shoshone Homeland Act spell their name correctly.

The tribe has a website with photographs, history and historical documents, starting with its 1863 treaty. The tribal government has offices in Bishop, California. A large collection of baskets made by tribal members is in the Eastern California Museum in Independence, California.

=== Historic Timbisha band districts or groups ===
Harold Driver recorded two Timbisha subgroups in Death Valley, the ″o'hya″ and the ″tu'mbica″ in 1937.

Julian Steward distinguished Timbisha Shoshone (in northern Death Valley) from the Kawaiisu (in southern Death Valley), both are Numic-speaking peoples but of different branches (Western: Timbisha; Southern: Kawaiisu) which inhibited mutual intelligibility.

Julian Steward identified four ″districts″ with bands (süüpantün) each led by a headmen or pokwinapi, made up of several family groups (nanümü, pl: nanümüppü) each, were traditionally linked by economic and kinship relationship (the highest population of the Timbisha was in the Little Lake Band area). The "districts" were commonly named after the most important village (katükkatün) that characterized the area (kantün - "possessing, characterized by [a special village]") and the bands were also named after the village name they occupied (-tsi - "people of such a place"); therefore the family groups living at the "Ko'on" village were known as "Ko'ontsi" ("People at the village Ko'on") and their "district" therefore was called "Ko'ongkatün" (Ko'on + kantün - "possessing, characterized by" the village Ko'on, i.e. Saline Valley People).

- Little Lake Band / Papunna/Pupunna Band ("pool, pond, i.e. litte lake", with some local groups living at Indian Gardens, Coso Hot Springs, Coso Range (located immediately south of dry lake Owens Lake, called Pattsiatta - "potash, soda ash") including the Upper Centennial Springs (Tsianapatün) and Lower Centennial Springs (Tsiapaikwasi), at springs south of Darwin, California (Tawinni), and in Argus Range (Tüntapun), most of their territory was taken over by the Naval Air Weapons Station China Lake; southwestern band)
  - Kuhwitsi (″People from Little Lake area″)
  - Koosotsi or Muattantsi (″People from Coso Hot Springs area″, this traditional cultural and healing ritual site was either known as Kooso or Muattan(g Ka))
  - Pakkwasitsi (″People of Pakkwasi, i.e. Olancha, California area″, just south of Owens Lake)
- Saline Valley Band / Ko'ongkatün Band (with some local groups living from the Inyo Mountains (Nününoppüh) in the west, to Saline Valley, Saline Range, Eureka Valley, Nelson Range, and Last Chance Range to the east; northwestern band)
  - Ko'ontsi (″People of Ko'ongkatün, i.e. Saline Valley, named after the village Ko'on, NW of Death Valley)
  - Pawüntsitsi (″People of Pawü(n)tsi, i.e. high country between Saline and Eureka Valleys, with the important water source Wongko Paa, i.e. Waucoba Spring in Waucoba Mountain (Wongkotoya(pi) - ″mountain with a lot of pine (tall timber)″) northwest of Saline Valley, which is also known as Isam Paa)
  - Siikaitsi or Siikai Nümü ("People of Siikai, i.e. from Hunter Mountain in the Cottonwood Mountains")
  - Tuhutsi (″People from Tuhu, i.e. Goldbelt Spring area in Cottonwood Canyon uplands″)
  - Napatüntsi (″People from Napatün, i.e. Cottonwood Canyon area west of Death Valley")
- Panamint Valley Band / Haüttangkatün Nookompin Band(with some local groups from Panamint Valley north of Ballarat, California eastward to Panamint Range; central band)
  - Haüttantsi ("People of Haüttangkatün, i.e. Warm Springs and Indian Ranch area of Panamint Valley", named after the village Haüttan)
  - Kaikottantsi (″People of Kaikottin, i.e. Panamint Range″)
  - Siümpüttsi (″People of Siümpüttsi, i.e. the Telescope Peak area in the Panamint Range″, the Telescope Peak was also known as Mukutoya)
  - Süünapatüntsi (″People from Süünapatün, i.e. Wild Rose Canyon in Panamint Valley″, with the important spring named Kantapettsi)
  - Omatsi (″People from Omakatün, i.e. Trona, California area in Searles Valley", Trona is now called Toona)
- Death Valley Band / Tümpisakka(tün) Band (with some local groups from Death Valley north of Furnace Creek, California west to Funeral Mountains and Amargosa Range, Amargosa Valley around Beatty, Nevada as well northwest to Grapevine Mountains; eastern band)
  - Tümpisattsi (″People of Tümpisakkatün″, i.e. of Furnace Creek and Death Valley; Harold Driver's ″tu'mbica″)
  - Naitipanittsi (″People of Naitipani, i.e. Lida Springs, Nevada")
  - Koa Panawe ("People of Koa, i.e. Silver Peak Range near Lida, Nevada", mixed Timbisha-Northern Paiute group)
  - Ohyüttsi ("People of Ohyü", i.e. Mesquite Flats north of Stove Pipe Wells (Tukummuttun, former name: Surveyors Well)" in northern Death Valley; Harold Driver's ″o'hya″)
  - Maahunuttsi ("People of Maahunu", i.e. from Grapevine Canyon")
  - Okwakaittsi ("People of Okwakai", i.e. from Grapevine Mountains area")

== Petroglyphs ==
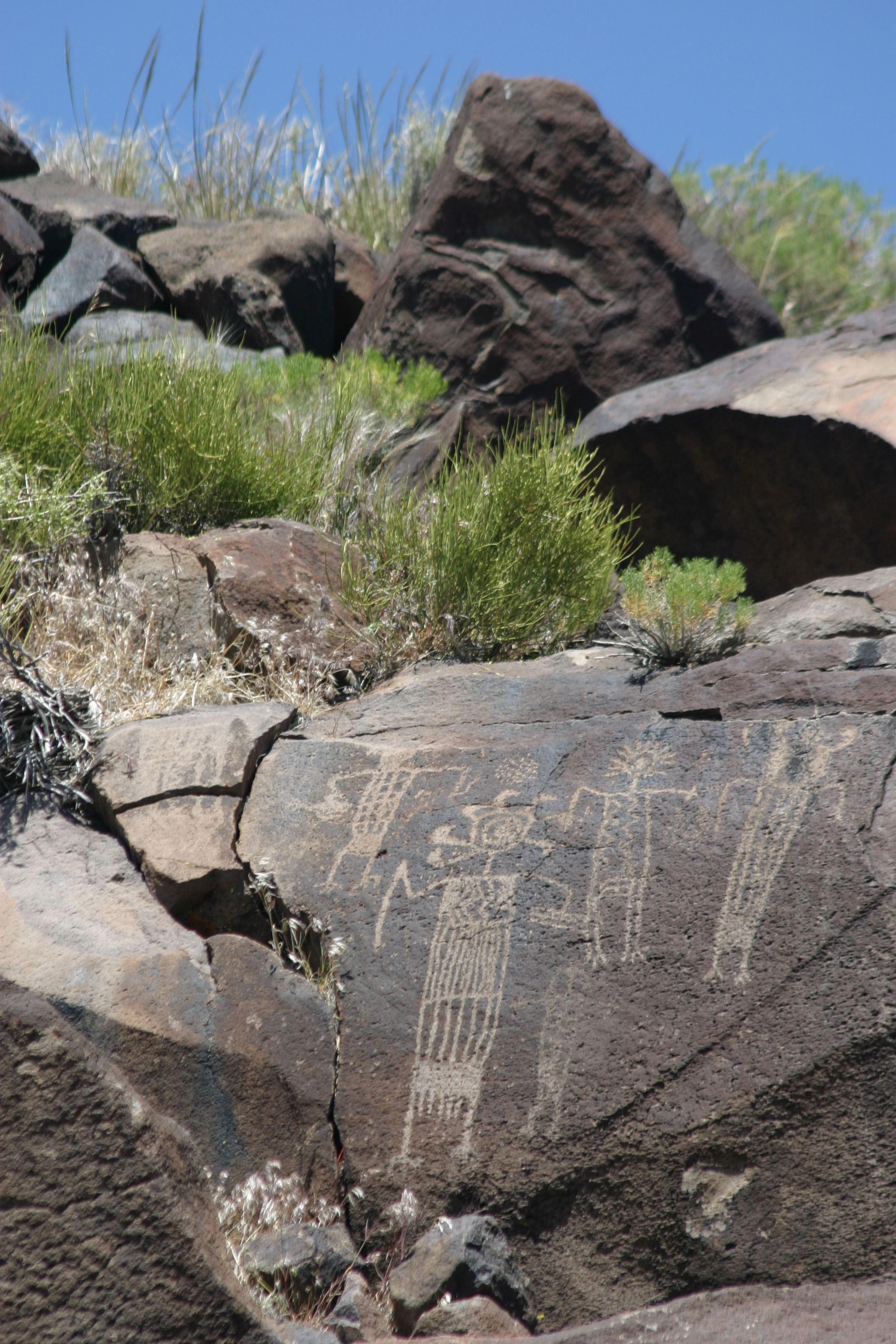
Coso petroglyphs

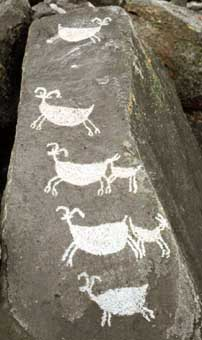
Coso sheep

Notable rock art drawings, petroglyphs, are abundantly represented in Big and Little Petroglyph Canyons. Such works have been found in the Coso Rock Art District, and throughout the Coso Region, dating from the prehistoric era.

In 1964, the Big and Little Petroglyph Canyons were declared a National Historic Landmark. In 2001, they were incorporated into a larger National Historic Landmark District, called the Coso Rock Art District.

In 2014, an annual celebration was created in honor of the petroglyphs. The Ridgecrest Petroglyph Festival takes place in Ridgecrest, California, and was named one of the "10 Most Unique Autumn Festivals in the Country" by Groupon. The festival includes an intertribal powwow, street fair, and tours to the Big and Little Petroglyph Canyons.

The Coso Rock Art District of California has been designated as a National Historic Landmark District.

=== Petroglyphs Tour ===
Only U.S. citizens are allowed on the tours, and advance reservation is required. Related museums are:

- Maturango Museum, 100 E. Las Flores Ave., Ridgecrest, CA 93555; (760) 375–6900.
- Naval Air Weapons Station, (760) 939–1683.

== See also ==
- Indian Village, California
- Timbisha language

== Bibliography ==
- Hinton, Leanne. Flutes of Fire. Berkeley, CA: Heyday Books, 1994. ISBN 0-930588-62-2.
- Miller, Mark Edwin. Forgotten Tribes: Unrecognized Indians and the Federal Acknowledgment Process. Lincoln: University of Nebraska Press, 2004.
- Miller, Wick R. "Numic Languages." d'Azevedo, Warren L., Volume Editor. Handbook of North American Indians, Volume 11: Great Basin. Washington, DC: Smithsonian Institution, 1986. ISBN 978-0-16-004581-3.
- Pritzker, Barry M. A Native American Encyclopedia: History, Culture, and Peoples. Oxford: Oxford University Press, 2000. ISBN 978-0-19-513877-1.
- Thomas, David Hurst, Lorann S. A. Pendleton, and Stephen C. Cappannari. "Western Shoshone." d'Azevedo, Warren L., Volume Editor. Handbook of North American Indians, Volume 11: Great Basin. Washington, DC: Smithsonian Institution, 1986. ISBN 978-0-16-004581-3.
- The Bradshaw Foundation, American Rock Art Archive, Alan P. Garfinkel. 2006. "Paradigm Shifts, Rock Art Studies, and the "Coso Sheep Cult" of Eastern California",North American Archaeologist 27(3):203-244
- Alan P. Garfinkel. 2005. Archaeology and Rock Art of the Eastern Sierra and Great Basin Frontier, Maturango Museum, Ridgecrest, California
- Alan P. Garfinkel. 2006. "Paradigm Shifts, Rock Art Studies, and the "Coso Sheep Cult" of Eastern California", North American Archaeologist 27(3):203-244
- Alan P.Garfinkel, Geron Marcom, and Robert A. Schiffman. 2006. "Culture Crisis and Rock Art Intensification: Numic Ghost Dance Paintings and Coso Representational Petroglyphs", American Indian Rock Art, Volume 33, Don Christensen and Peggy Whitehead, editors, p. 83-103. American Rock Art Research Association, Tucson, Arizona.
- Campbell Grant, James W. Baird and J. Kenneth Pringle. 1968. Rock Drawings of the Coso Range, Inyo County, California: An Ancient Sheep-hunting Cult Pictured in Desert Rock Carvings, second edition, Maturango Press, 145 pages
- C. Michael Hogan. 2008. Morro Creek, ed. by A. Burnham
