= Little Lake, Inyo County, California =

Little Lake
- Former settlement
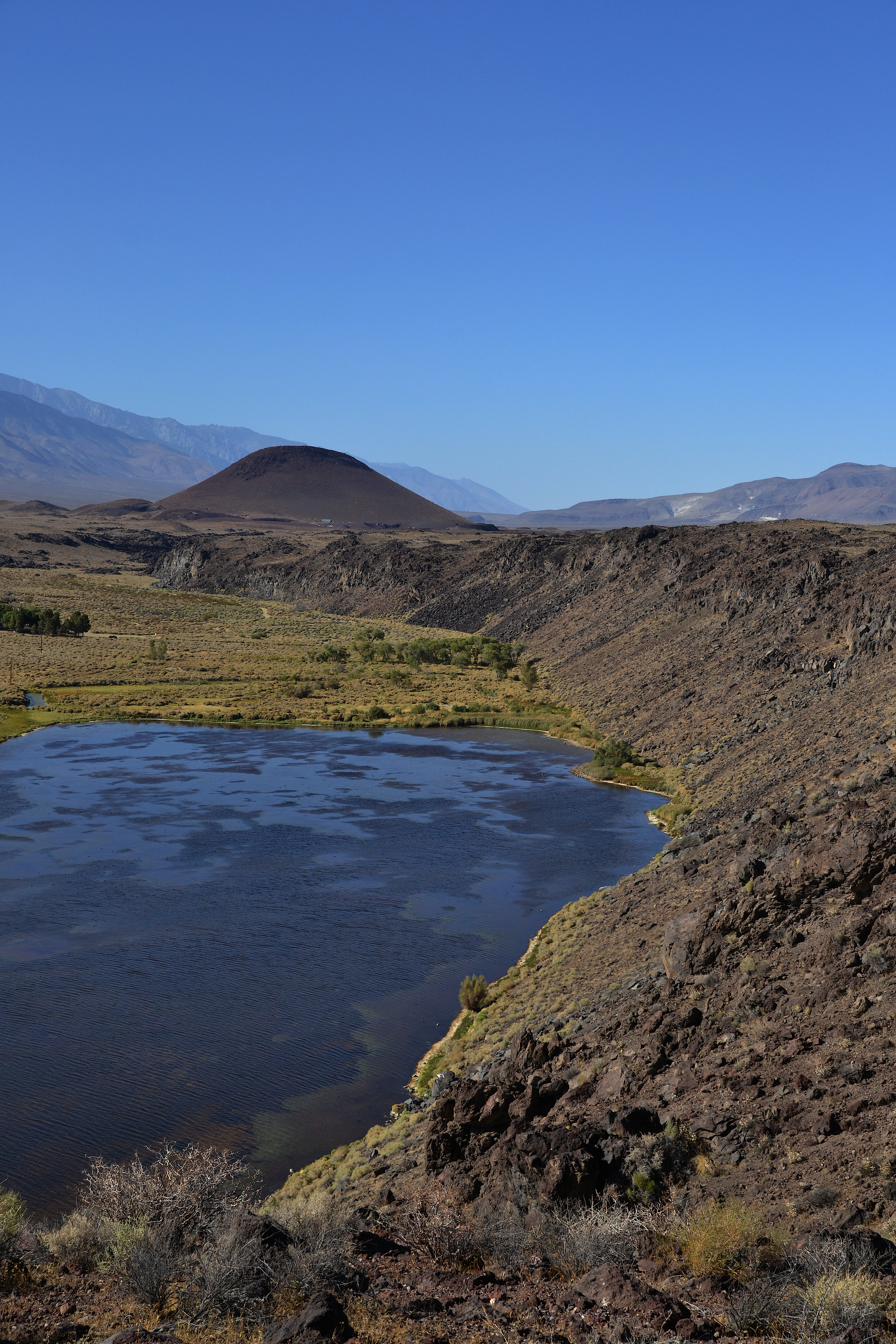

- Location in California
- Coordinates: 35°56′12″N 117°54′24″W
- Country: United States
- State: California
- County: Inyo
- Elevation: 3,130 ft (954 m)

Little Lake is a former settlement in Inyo County, California, United States that lies just off U.S. Route 395 on Little Lake Road.

== History ==
Little Lake was established largely as a traveler's stop along what eventually became US 395, after the Los Angeles Department of Water and Power dammed the site's eponymous landmark – once known as Owens Little Lake – as part of its work on the Los Angeles Aqueduct in 1905.

While early on the town had a store, auto repair shop and gas station, its most famous landmark was its namesake, rock-faced hotel constructed in 1923.

Little Lake was a necessary stop for travelers journeying up to the Eastern Sierra from Los Angeles for decades. In the 1920s, a trip from Los Angeles to a town such as Lone Pine might take two or three days necessitating a stay at locations like Little Lake before continuing onwards. In the 1940s, “sportsman traffic heading northward along US 395 considered Little Lake an important stop to spray cooling water on boiling radiators, feed hungry stomachs or to get gasoline.”

The Little Lake Hotel in the 1950s

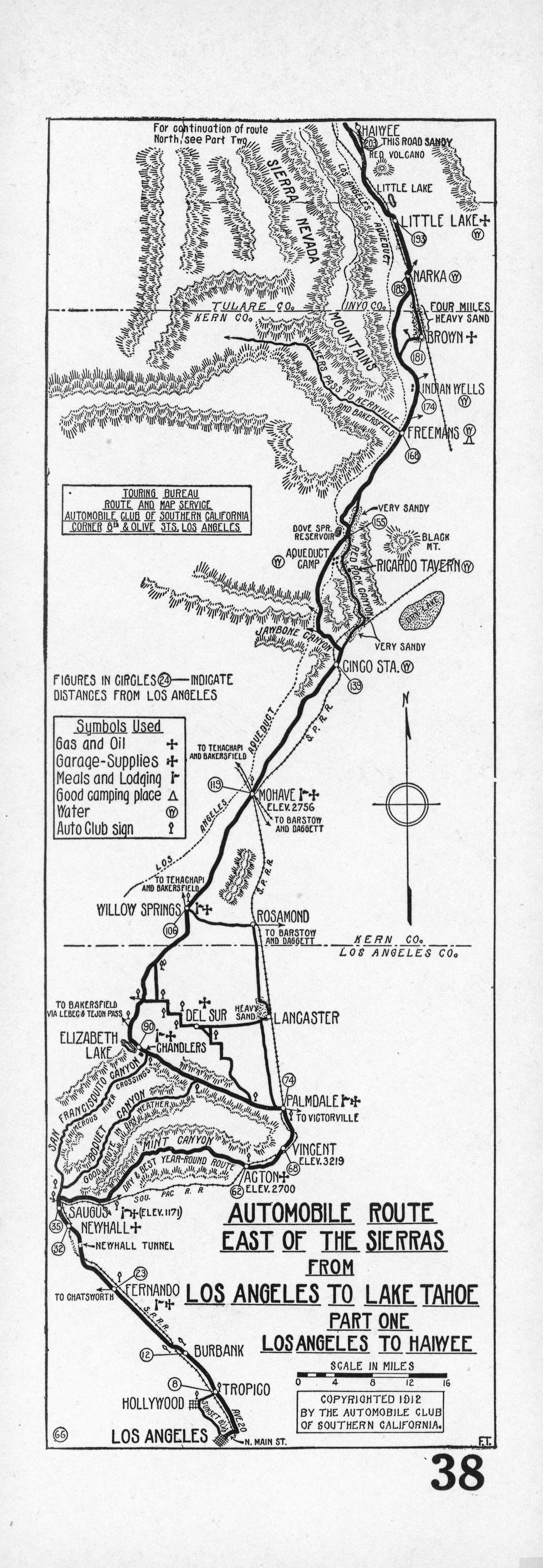
Automobile route east of the Sierras from Los Angeles to Lake Tahoe. Part one: Los Angeles to Haiwee, 1912. Little Lake is shown at the upper left.

=== Decline ===
As technology improved, travelers no longer needed to stop as often for rest and supplies. By the 1960s travelers could easily go from Los Angeles to locations in the Eastern Sierra with little more than brief stops for gas. With these improvements small settlements like Bramlette, named after the founder and later renamed Little Lake, became increasingly obsolete. In the early 1960s, US 395 was realigned. As a result, the former alignment that Little Lake was built on became a frontage road known as Little Lake Road, and the need to access it by leaving US 395 eventually spelled the demise of local businesses. In 1981, with Little Lake's population at 52 residents, Southern Pacific's Jawbone Branch that passed Little Lake had already long been abandoned and the rails were permanently removed. The Little Lake Hotel, which had evolved into an apartment building for local residents, burned in 1989 and was never rebuilt. In 1997, the United States Postal Service ended service at Little Lake, and by the early 2000s Little Lake Road, building foundations, off ramps and even its road signs were bulldozed into oblivion and hauled away.

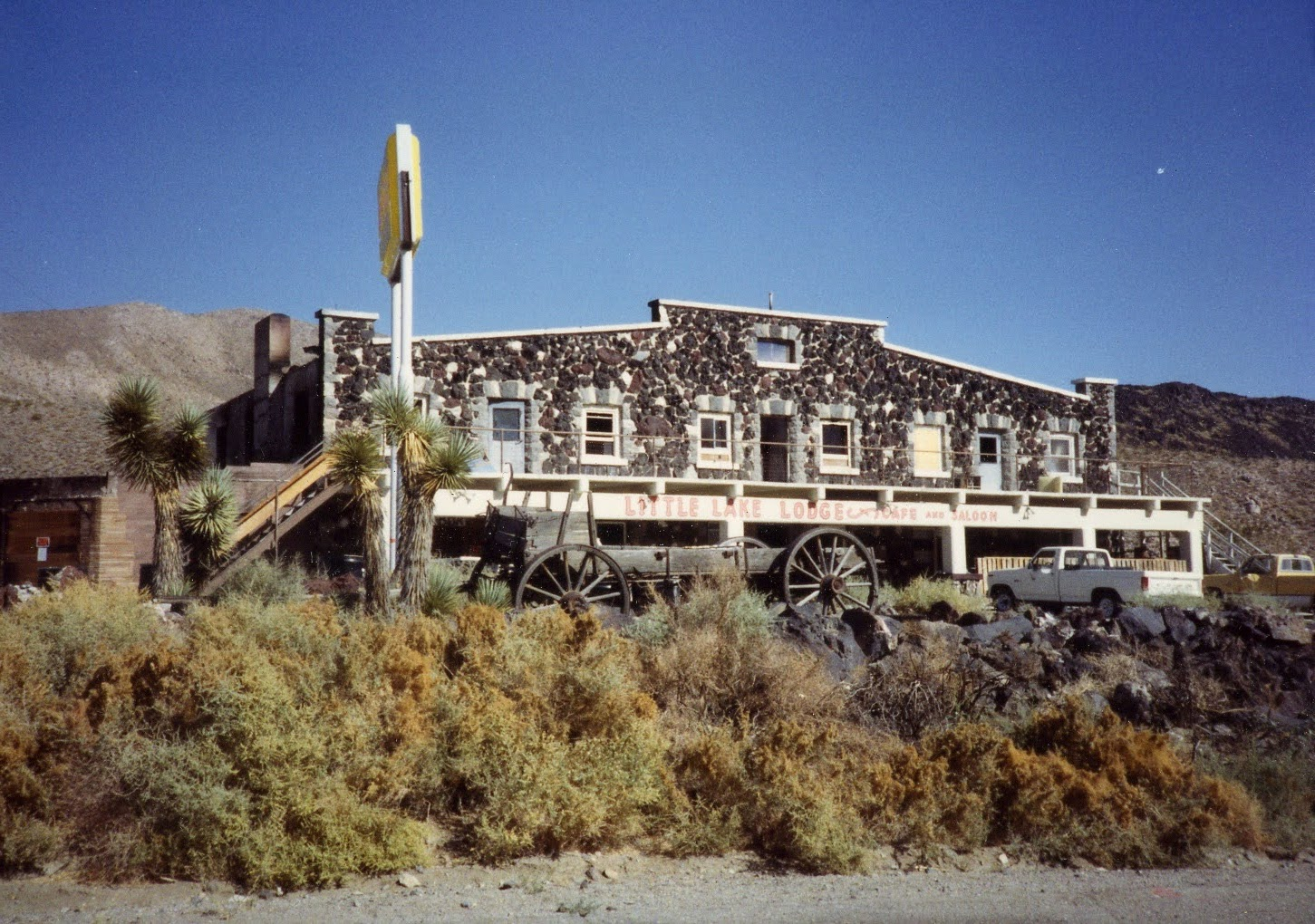
Little Lake Lodge in the early 1990's with missing roof after the fire.

=== Current state ===
Though it remains properly marked as a geographic location on a few maps, the entire townsite had been restored to its natural state by the summer of 2001. The little lake, for which the town was named, is all that remains.
