= Naval Air Weapons Station China Lake =

US Navy R&D installation in California

- Armitage Field
- Ridgecrest, California in United States
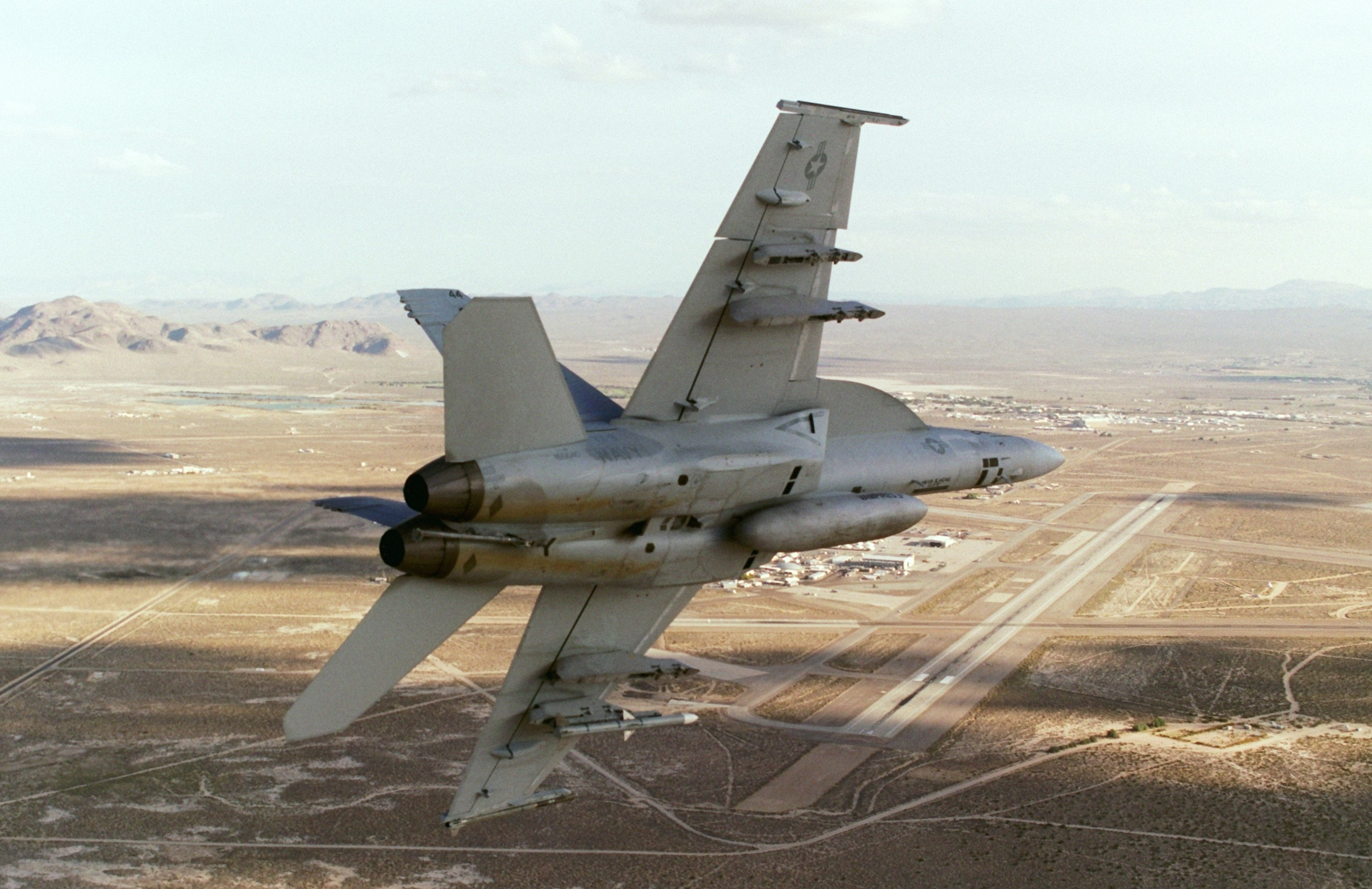
- An F/A-18F Super Hornet assigned to VX-9 returns to its home at NAWS China Lake

Site information
- Type: Naval Air Weapons Station
- Owner: Department of Defense
- Operator: US Navy
- Controlled by: Navy Region Southwest
- Condition: Operational
- Website: Official website

Location
- Location in the United States NAWS China Lake (California)
- Coordinates: 35°41′08″N 117°41′31″W
- Area: 1.1 million acres (450,000 hectares) (including ranges)

Site history
- Built: 1935 (civilian use)
- In use: 1942 – present
- Events: 2019 Ridgecrest earthquakes

Garrison information
- Current commander: RDML Keith ‘Brownie’ Hash

Airfield information
- Identifiers: ICAO: KNID, FAA LID: NID, WMO: 746120
- Elevation: 696.1 metres (2,284 ft) AMSL
Runways
Direction	Length and surface
03/21	3,048.3 metres (10,001 ft) Concrete
14/32	2,747.1 metres (9,013 ft) Asphalt
08/26	2,167.4 metres (7,111 ft) Concrete
- Other airfield facilities: 1x VTOL pad

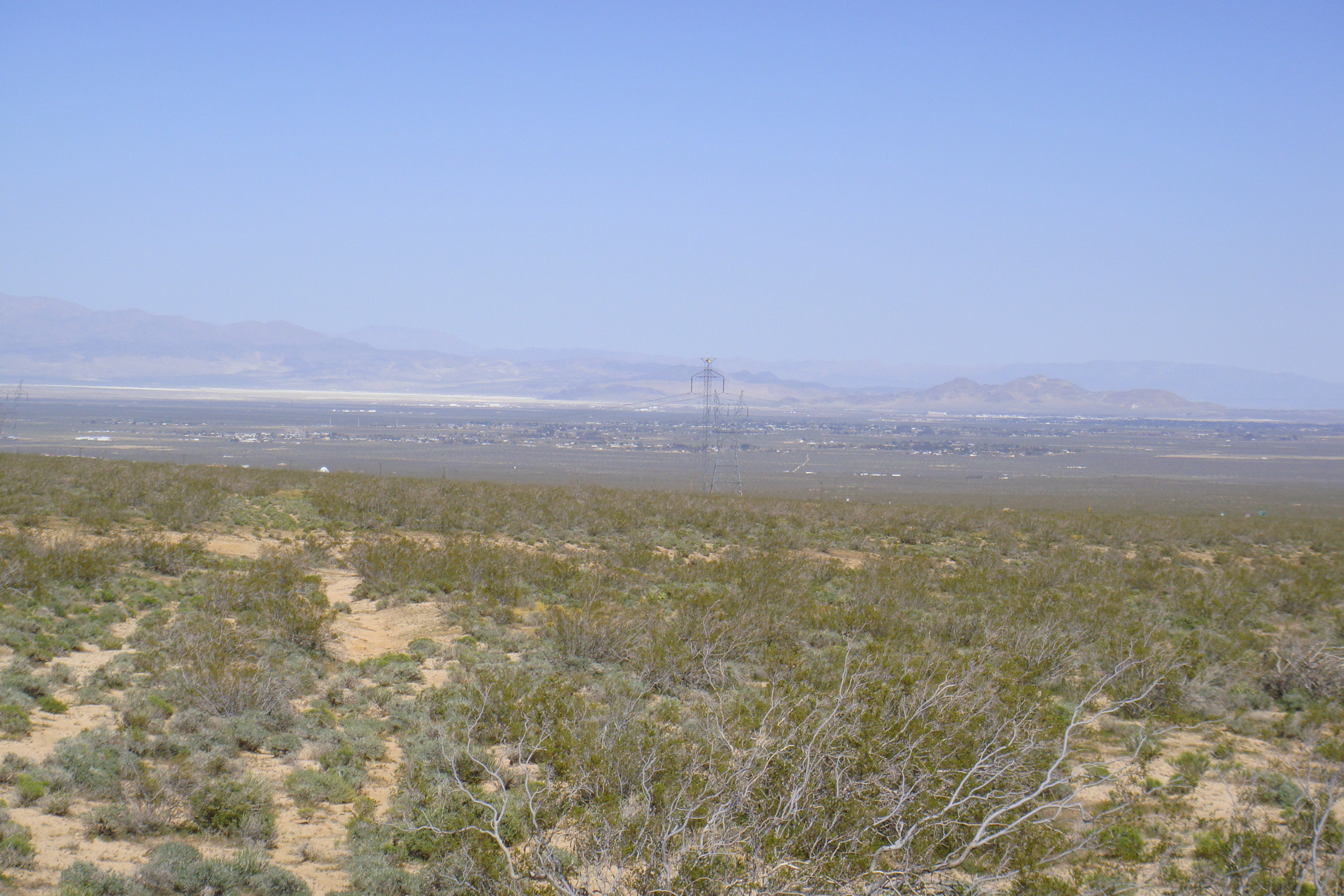
Indian Wells Valley, showing Ridgecrest, California and the China Lake area

Naval Air Weapons Station (NAWS) China Lake is a large military installation in California that supports the research, testing and evaluation programs of the United States Navy. It is part of Navy Region Southwest under Commander, Navy Installations Command, and was originally known as Naval Ordnance Test Station (NOTS).

The installation is located in the Western Mojave Desert region of California, approximately 150 miles (240 km) north of Los Angeles. Occupying land in three counties – Kern, San Bernardino, and Inyo – the installation's closest neighbors are the city of Ridgecrest and the communities of Inyokern, Trona, and Darwin.

China Lake is the United States Navy's largest single landholding, representing 85% of the Navy's land for weapons and armaments research, development, acquisition, testing, and evaluation (RDAT&E) use and 38% of the Navy's land holdings worldwide. In total, its two ranges and main site cover more than 1,100,000 acres (4,500 km^{2}), an area larger than the state of Rhode Island. As of 2010, at least 95% of that land is undeveloped. The roughly $3 billion infrastructure of the installation consists of 2,132 buildings and facilities, 329 miles (529 km) of paved roads, and 1,801 miles (2,898 km) of unpaved roads.

The 19,600 square miles (51,000 km^{2}) of restricted and controlled airspace at China Lake makes up 12% of California's total airspace. Jointly controlled by NAWS China Lake, Edwards Air Force Base and Fort Irwin, this airspace is known as the R-2508 Special Use Airspace Complex.

A 7.1 magnitude earthquake on July 5, 2019, whose epicenter was within the boundaries of NAWS China Lake, resulted in the facility being temporarily evaluated as "not mission capable" due to damage.

== Geography ==
=== Location ===
The installation is located in the Western Mojave Desert region of California, approximately 150 miles (240 km) north of Los Angeles. Occupying land in three counties – Kern, San Bernardino, and Inyo – the installation's closest neighbors are the city of Ridgecrest and the communities of Inyokern, Trona, and Darwin.

==== Armitage Field ====
All aircraft operations at NAWS China Lake are conducted at Armitage Field, which has three runways with more than 26,000 feet (7,900 m) of taxiway. More than 20,000 crewed and uncrewed military sorties are conducted out of Armitage by U.S. Armed Forces each year.

Foreign military personnel also use the airfield and range to conduct more than 1,000 test and evaluation operations each year.

=== Wildlife ===
The majority of the land at NAWS China Lake is undeveloped. It provides habitat for more than 340 species of wildlife, including feral horses, feral burros (donkeys), bighorn sheep and endangered animals, such as the desert tortoise, Mojave ground squirrel and Mojave tui chub. The Mojave tui chub was introduced to China Lake's Lark Seep in 1971. Lark Seep is fed by the water outflow from a wastewater treatment plant located at China Lake. The tui chub population has since grown and expanded to a population of around 6,000 in 2003. The desert on which the installation is built is home to 650 plant types.

=== Petroglyphs ===
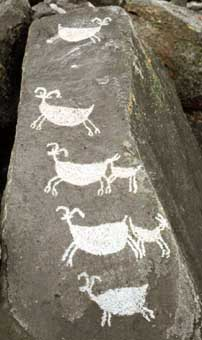
Coso rock art of bighorn sheep

The area was once home to the Native American Coso People, whose presence is marked by thousands of archaeological sites; the Coso traded with other tribes as far away as San Luis Obispo County, California. This locale was also used by European miners and settlers whose cabins and mining structures are extant throughout the Station.

The Coso Range Canyons are home to the Coso Rock Art District, an area of some 99 square miles (260 km^{2}) which contains more than 50,000 documented petroglyphs, the highest concentration of rock art in the Northern Hemisphere.

The precise age of the petroglyphs is unknown. A broad range of dates can be inferred from archaeological sites in the area and some artifact forms depicted on the rocks. Archaeologists disagree on their age, but it is generally believed that most petroglyphs are between one and three thousand years old. Designs range from animals to abstract to anthropomorphic figures. Opinions vary widely on whether the petroglyphs were made for ceremonial purposes, whether they tell stories to pass along the mythology of their makers, or whether they are records of hunting hopes or successes, clan symbols, or maps.

Declared a National Historic Landmark in 1964, the rock art in Little Petroglyph Canyon provides insights into the cultural heritage and knowledge of the desert's past. Everything in the canyon area is protected, including the obsidian chips and any artifacts or tools, as well as the petroglyphs and native vegetation and wildlife.

Little Petroglyph Canyon contains 20,000 documented images. It is open to the public for tours.

=== Monorail ===
Remains of the Epsom Salts Monorail are signposted and visible within the site. The central rail, on which mining tractors pulled minerals from a mine to the nearest railway siding, was supported on wooden A-frames of a low trestle.

=== Coso Geothermal Field ===
The Coso Geothermal Field is within China Lake boundaries. The geothermal power plants located there began generating electricity in 1987 and were the Navy's first foray into producing clean power from the earth's thermal energy (heat). The plant's nameplate capacity is 270 megawatts, with a total annual electricity production from the field of 1,175 gigawatt-hours.

== Tenant Squadrons ==
Insignia	Squadron	Code	Callsign/Nickname	Assigned Aircraft
	Air Test and Evaluation Squadron 9	VX-9	Vampires	F/A-18E Super Hornet, F/A-18F Super Hornet, E/A-18G Growler, F-35C Lightning II
	Air Test and Evaluation Squadron 31	VX-31	Dust Devils	F/A-18C Hornet, F/A-18D Hornet, F/A-18E Super Hornet, F/A-18F Super Hornet, E/A-18G Growler, MH-60S Seahawk,

== Tenant commands ==
The 620 active duty military, 4,166 civilian employees and 1,734 contractors that make up China Lake's workforce are employed across multiple tenant commands, including:

- Naval Air Warfare Center Weapons Division
- Air Test and Evaluation Squadron 9 (VX-9)
- Air Test and Evaluation Squadron 31 (VX-31)
- Marine Aviation Detachment
- Explosive Ordnance Disposal Mobile Unit 3 Detachment
- Explosive Ordnance Disposal Testing and Evaluation Unit 1
- Naval Facilities Engineering Command Southwest Detachment
- Naval Construction Training Center Port Hueneme (Seabees)

== History ==
China Lake is a dry lake. Its name comes from Chinese prospectors harvesting borax from the lake bed, approximately 1.5 miles (2.4 km) south of Paxton Ranch. The operation was known locally as "The Little Chinese Borax Works".

=== Naval Ordnance Test Station (NOTS) ===
Amid World War II, adequate facilities were needed by the California Institute of Technology (Caltech) for test and evaluation of rockets. At the same time, the Navy needed a new proving ground for aviation ordnance. Caltech's Charles C. Lauritsen and then U.S. Navy Commander Sherman E. Burroughs worked together to find a site that would meet both their needs.

In the early 1930s, an emergency landing field had been built by the Works Progress Administration in the Mojave Desert near the small town of Inyokern, California. Opened in 1935, the field was acquired by the United States Army Air Forces (USAAF) in 1942. In November 1943, it was transferred to the Navy, which established China Lake as the Naval Ordnance Test Station (NOTS).

The NOTS mission was defined in a letter by the Secretary of the Navy as ".... a station having for its primary function the research, development, and testing of weapons, and having an additional function of furnishing primary training in the use of such weapons." Testing began within a month of the Station's formal establishment. The vast and sparsely populated desert, with near-perfect flying weather and practically unlimited visibility, proved an ideal location for test and evaluation activities and a complete research and development establishment.

During 1944, NOTS worked on the development and testing of the 3.5-inch, 5-inch, HVAR and 11.75-inch (Tiny Tim) rockets.

Manhattan Project funding was used to construct a new airfield at NOTS, with three runways, 10,000 feet (3,000 m), 7,700 feet (2,300 m) and 9,000 feet (2,700 m) long, each 200 feet (61 m) wide to accommodate the Boeing B-29 Superfortress bomber. Fuel storage was provided with a capacity of 200,000 US gallons (760,000 L) of gasoline and 20,000 US gallons (76,000 L) of oil. The airfield was opened on June 1, 1945, and named Armitage Field after Navy Lieutenant John Armitage, who was killed while testing a Tiny Tim rocket at NOTS in August 1944. Work done by Caltech at NOTS for the Manhattan Project - particularly the testing of bomb shapes dropped from B-29s - was included as part of codename Project Camel.

In 1950, NOTS scientists and engineers developed the air-intercept missile (AIM) 9 Sidewinder, which became the world's most used and most copied air-to-air missile. Other rockets and missiles developed or tested at China Lake include the Mighty Mouse, Zuni, Shrike, HARM, Joint Stand-Off Weapon (JSOW) and Joint Direct Attack Munition (JDAM).

The two Randsburg Wash Target Test Towers (Buildings 70021 and 70022) situated at 35°32′13″N 117°14′59″W are significant for their role in the naval testing of proximity or variable time (VT) fuzes, a vital element of the U.S. Navy's weapons program. The towers played a key role in the Cold War proximity fuze test program at the U.S. Navy's Randsburg Wash facility, a program that eventually led to the Navy adapting the use of these fuzes to guided missiles. The towers are important on a national level during the period of significance between 1952 and 1960; the years in which the most important achievements in the U.S. Navy's developments of the properties and attributes of proximity fuzes. The towers are also significant for their unique engineering achievement, as 360 foot-tall, pyramidal wood towers. Targets are suspended between the two towers.

In June 1963, President John F. Kennedy visited NAWS China Lake for an air show and to see the Michelson Lab.

=== Naval Weapons Center ===
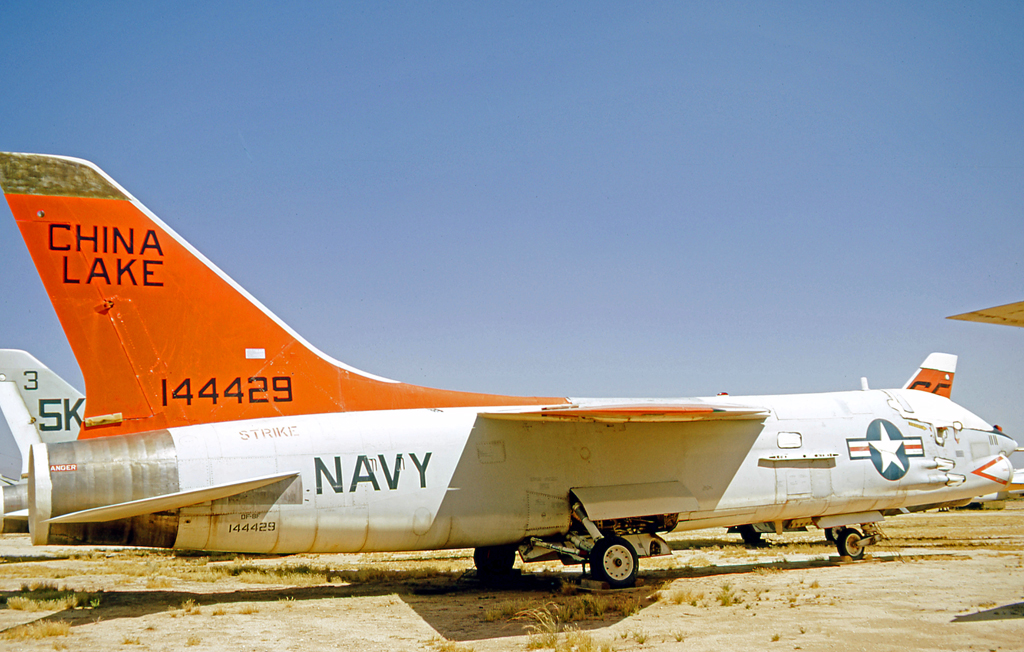
Vought DF-8F Crusader drone director originally based at USN China Lake

In July 1967, NOTS China Lake and the Naval Ordnance Laboratory in Corona, California, became the Naval Weapons Center. The Corona facilities were closed, and their functions transferred to the desert in 1971. In July 1979, the mission and functions of the National Parachute Test Range at Naval Air Facility El Centro were transferred to China Lake.

=== Naval Air Weapons Station ===
In January 1992, the Naval Weapons Center and the Pacific Missile Test Center Point Mugu were disestablished and joined with naval units at Kirtland AFB in Albuquerque and at the White Sands Missile Range at White Sands, NM as a single command - the Naval Air Warfare Center Weapons Division (NAWCWD) of the Naval Air Systems Command (NAVAIR). At the same time, the physical plant at China Lake was designated as a Naval Air Weapons Station and became the host of the NAVAIR Weapons Division, performing the base-keeping functions.

In 1982, the community area of China Lake, including most of the base housing, was annexed by the City of Ridgecrest. In 2013, Congress reserved China Lake's acreage for an additional 25 years for military use.

In 2014, U.S. Representative Kevin McCarthy of California introduced a bill to permanently designate Naval Air Weapons Station China Lake property for military use, arguing it would save taxpayer money and enhance the base's mission. The bill would add 25,000 acres (10,000 ha), including about 7,500 acres (3,000 ha) that were part of a bombing range in San Bernardino County, as well as 19,000 acres (7,700 ha) along the station's southwest boundary. The Bureau of Land Management said that DoD needs could change in future decades and that it is a popular recreation area with trail riding, campsites, and hunting, and an important wildlife corridor, especially for the threatened desert tortoise.

Between November 7 and 9, 2018, NAWS was used as the filming location for the fictional Mach 10-capable aircraft known as Darkstar featured in the opening scene of Paramount's Top Gun: Maverick, later released in 2022.

In July 2019, two large earthquakes struck Southern California; both had epicenters within the NAWS boundaries. The first, on July 4, a 6.4 magnitude quake, caused no injuries at NAWS, and the initial reports showed that all buildings were intact. The second, a 7.1 magnitude earthquake on July 5, resulted in the facility being evaluated as "not mission capable". The report shows that officials assessed all buildings, utilities, and facilities — 3,598 structures in all — for 13 days after the earthquakes and found damage totaled $5.2 billion. Replacing buildings alone would cost $2.2 billion, but officials also must replace or repair specialized equipment, furniture, machine tools, telecommunication assets and other facilities.

== Weapons developed at China Lake ==
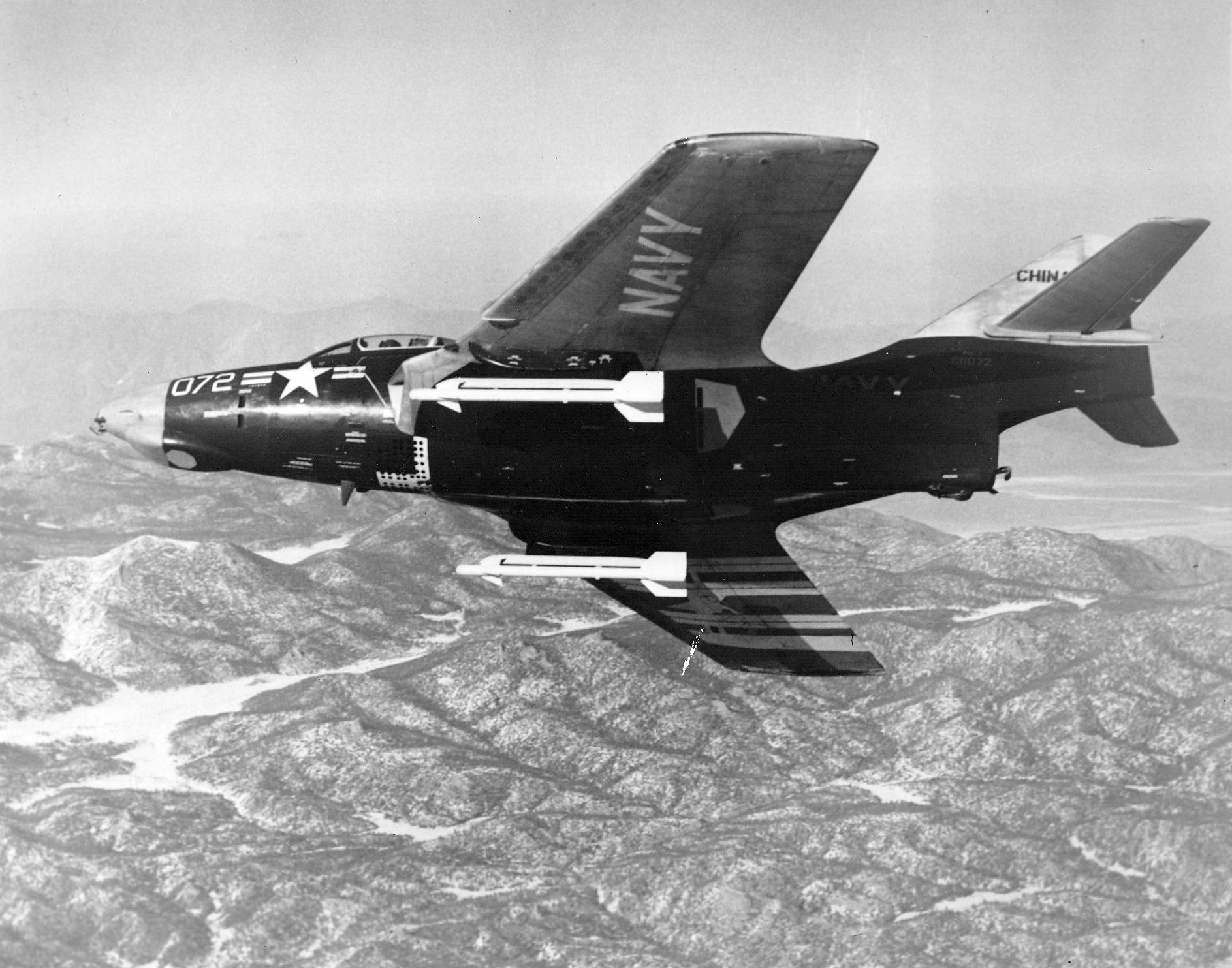
A U.S. Navy F9F-8 Cougar armed with AIM-9B Sidewinder missiles. Photo taken in November 1956.

- AAM-N-5 Meteor
- AIM-9 Sidewinder
- AGM-45 Shrike
- AGM-62 Walleye
- BOAR (rocket)
- China Lake Grenade Launcher
- CL-20
- Gimlet (rocket)
- Holy Moses (rocket)
- Hopi (missile)
- LTV-N-4
- Ram (rocket)
- RUR-4 Weapon Alpha
- SLAM-ER
- Terasca
- Tiny Tim (rocket)
- Tomahawk (missile family)

=== Other notable projects ===
- Glowstick
- NOTS-EV-1 Pilot

== See also ==
- Nevada Test and Training Range
- Space Test and Training Range
- Utah Test and Training Range
- Big and Little Petroglyph Canyons
- List of airports in Kern County, California
- List of United States Navy airfields
