= Sherman E. Burroughs =

Sherman E. Burroughs may refer to:

- Sherman Everett Burroughs (1870–1923), U.S. congressman from New Hampshire
- Sherman E. Burroughs (United States Navy) (1903–1992), his son, United States Navy admiral
- Sherman E. Burroughs High School, California, USA, named for the admiral
