= Jay Carty =

American basketball player

Personal information
- Born: July 4, 1941 West Plains, Missouri, U.S.
- Died: May 4, 2017 (aged 75) Santa Barbara, California, U.S.
- Listed height: 6 ft 8 in (2.03 m)
- Listed weight: 220 lb (100 kg)

Career information
- High school: Sherman E. Burroughs (Ridgecrest, California)
- College: Oregon State (1959–1962)
- NBA draft: 1962: 6th round, 46th overall pick
- Drafted by: St. Louis Hawks
- Playing career: 1968–1969
- Position: Power forward
- Number: 52

Career history
- 1968–1969: Los Angeles Lakers
- Stats at NBA.com
- Stats at Basketball Reference

Jay J. Carty Jr. (July 4, 1941 – May 4, 2017) was an American basketball player, public speaker, church consultant, and ministry leader.

He played college basketball for the Oregon State Beavers, and was selected by the St. Louis Hawks in the sixth round (48th pick overall) of the 1962 NBA draft. He played for the Los Angeles Lakers (1968–69) in the National Basketball Association for 28 games.

Later, Carty worked in business in Oregon and Southern California.

Jay went on to a career in public speaking, founding "Yes! Ministries," speaking to thousands of youth and families across America. Jay authored many books, including books written with UCLA coach, John Wooden.

In 2012, Carty was diagnosed with multiple myeloma. He died from this disease on May 4, 2017, aged 75.

== Career statistics ==
Legend
GP	Games played	GS	Games started	MPG	Minutes per game
FG%	Field goal percentage	3P%	3-point field goal percentage	FT%	Free throw percentage
RPG	Rebounds per game	APG	Assists per game	SPG	Steals per game
BPG	Blocks per game	PPG	Points per game	**Bold**	Career high

=== NBA ===
==== Regular season ====
Year	Team	GP	MPG	FG%	FT%	RPG	APG	PPG
1968–69	L.A. Lakers	28	6.7	.382	.727	2.1	.4	2.7

==== Playoffs ====
Year	Team	GP	MPG	FG%	FT%	RPG	APG	PPG
1969	L.A. Lakers	3	3.3	.000	.333	.7	.3	.3
