= 2019 Ridgecrest earthquakes =

July 4–5, 2019, earthquakes in California

- UTC time: A: 2019-07-04 17:33:49; B: 2019-07-06 03:19:52; C: 2020-06-04 01:32:11
- ISC event: A: 616217956; B: 616203758; C: 618435293
- USGS-ANSS: A: ComCat; B: ComCat; C: ComCat
- Local date: A: July 4, 2019; B: July 5, 2019; C: June 3, 2020
- Local time: A: 10:33 a.m. PDT; B: 8:19 p.m. PDT; C: 6:32 p.m. PDT
- Magnitude: A: M_{w} 6.4; B: M_{w} 7.1; C: M_{w} 5.5
- Depth: A: 10.7 km (6.6 mi); B: 8.0 km (5.0 mi); C: 6.8 km (4.2 mi)
- Epicenter: 35.766°N 117.605°W
- Type: Strike-slip
- Areas affected: California, Nevada, Arizona
- Total damage: $5.3 billion
- Max. intensity: MMI IX (Violent)
- Peak acceleration: 0.48 g
- Foreshocks: 2 (≥2.5 M_{w}) (including before main foreshock)
- Aftershocks: 4,000; ~1,200 (≥2.5 M_{w}) (including after main foreshock)
- Casualties: 1 death, 25 injured (20 on July 4, 5 on July 5)

Earthquakes occurred north and northeast of the town of Ridgecrest, California, located in Kern County and west of Searles Valley (approximately 200 km [122 mi] north-northeast of Los Angeles) on July 4-5, 2019. They included two initial main shocks of M_{w} magnitudes 6.4 and 7.1, and many perceptible aftershocks, mainly within the area of the Naval Air Weapons Station China Lake. Eleven months later, a M_{w}5.5 aftershock took place (the largest aftershock of the sequence) to the east of Ridgecrest. The first main shock (now deemed to be a foreshock) occurred on Thursday, July 4 at 10:33 a.m. PDT, approximately 18 km (11.2 mi) ENE of Ridgecrest, and 13 km (8.1 mi) WSW of Trona, on a previously unnoticed NE-SW trending fault where it intersects the NW-SE trending Little Lake Fault Zone. This quake was preceded by several smaller earthquakes, and was followed by more than 1,400 detected aftershocks. The M 7.1 quake struck on Friday, July 5 at 8:19 p.m. PDT approximately 10 km (6 miles) to the northwest. The mainshock, was the most powerful earthquake to occur in the state in 20 years (after the 1999 Hector Mine earthquake). Subsequent aftershocks extended approximately 50 km (~30 miles) along the Little Lake Fault Zone.

Relatively minor damage resulted from the initial foreshock, though some building fires were reported in Ridgecrest near the epicenter. The main quake on July 5 cut power to at least 3,000 residents in Ridgecrest. Effects were felt across much of Southern California, parts of Arizona and Nevada, as far north as the San Francisco Bay Area and Sacramento, and as far south as Baja California, Mexico. An estimated 20 million people experienced the foreshock, and approximately 30 million people experienced the mainshock.

== Earthquakes ==
The July 2019 Ridgecrest earthquakes consist of three main shocks of magnitudes 6.4, 5.4, and 7.1, each followed by a flurry of aftershocks of substantially lower magnitude.

The aftershocks of the Ridgecrest earthquakes reveal two fault zones. The July 4 M 6.4 event (orange dot) occurred on the SW-NE fault where it intersects the NW-SE oriented fault. The red dot marks the M 7.1 event.

At 10:02 a.m. PDT (17:02 UTC) on July 4, 2019, a 4.0 M_{w} foreshock occurred about 6.8 mi (10.9 km) southwest of Searles Valley, California. A foreshock registering 6.4 M_{w} occurred at 10:33 a.m. PDT (17:33 UTC) 7.5 mi (12.1 km) southwest of Searles Valley. The most populated area near the epicenter was Ridgecrest, home to 28,000 people. The foreshock originated along a strike-slip fault in the Eastern California Shear Zone, a region frequented by earthquake swarms, near the edge of Death Valley National Park. The rupture occurred along a 10 mi (16 km) section of an unspecified fault. Earth on either side of the fault was deformed, with lateral shifts of 6–8 in (15–20 cm) in the immediate vicinity. The exact fault it occurred on is uncertain with many small faults encompassing the region, though United States Geological Survey (USGS) seismologist Susan Hough stated it may have been the Little Lake Fault. Focused at a relatively shallow depth of 6.6 mi (10.7 km), the foreshock affected a large region populated by 20 million people. Residents near the epicenter reported that shaking lasted approximately 30 seconds. Shaking was felt as far north as Sacramento, California, eastward to Phoenix, Arizona, and as far south as Baja California, Mexico, with evacuations taking place in Mexicali and Tijuana.

At 8:19 p.m. PDT on July 5, a larger 7.1 M_{w} earthquake occurred in the Ridgecrest area after being preceded by a 5.0 M_{w} foreshock 3 minutes prior, revealing the previous day's 6.4 M_{w} earthquake to have been a foreshock. All three earthquakes have been described by the United States Geological Survey as occurring via shallow strike-slip mechanisms. Subsequent seismic activity occurred along two intersecting faults in the Little Lake Fault Zone.

=== Aftershocks ===
A significant series of additional earthquakes followed the foreshock, with the majority of magnitudes ranging approximately 2–4 M_{w}. By the evening of July 5, more than 1,400 earthquakes occurred, the strongest of which measured 5.4 M_{w} at 4:07 a.m. PDT (11:07 UTC) on July 5. Shaking from this aftershock was felt as far north as Fresno, as far south as Laguna Hills (including Los Angeles), and as far east as Las Vegas, Nevada. No additional damage occurred from any of the aftershocks. The number of aftershocks within hours of the earthquake were unusually high, but not unprecedented.

Thousands more aftershocks occurred following the 7.1 M_{w} event, with the total number of aftershocks exceeding 3,000 by the morning of July 7. Geologists at the USGS estimate an additional 34,000 aftershocks in the six months following the earthquakes.

On June 3, 2020, at 6:32 PM PST, a 5.5 M_{w} aftershock was recorded 11 miles south of Searles Valley. This aftershock is tied for the strongest aftershock following the 7.1 M_{w} mainshock.

Events at or above M_{w} 4.5 associated with the 2019 Ridgecrest earthquakes
Date	Time (UTC)	Magnitude M_{w}	MMI	Depth	Location	Ref.
July 4	17:33:49	6.4	VIII	6.4 mi (10.3 km)	7.5 mi (12 km) SW of Searles Valley	
July 4	18:39:44	4.6	VI	1.7 mi (2.8 km)	4.3 mi (7 km) ESE of Ridgecrest	
July 4	18:56:06	4.6	VI	1.2 mi (1.9 km)	9.3 mi (15 km) NE of Ridgecrest	
July 4	19:21:32	4.5	VI	3.2 mi (5.2 km)	8.1 mi (13 km) SSW of Searles Valley	
July 5	11:07:53	5.4	VII	4.3 mi (7.0 km)	9.9 mi (16 km) W of Searles Valley	
July 6	03:16:32	5.0	VII	0.6 mi (0.9 km)	8.7 mi (14 km) WSW of Searles Valley	
July 6	03:19:53	7.1	IX	5.0 mi (8.0 km)	11 mi (18 km) W of Searles Valley	
July 6	03:22:03	4.6	VII	5.7 mi (9.1 km)	9.9 mi (16 km) E of Little Lake	
July 6	03:22:48	5.0	VI	5.9 mi (9.5 km)	9.9 mi (16 km) ESE of Little Lake	
July 6	03:23:50	5.4	VII	7.7 mi (12.4 km)	11 mi (18 km) WNW of Searles Valley	
July 6	03:25:27	5.0	VI	7.0 mi (11.2 km)	14 mi (23 km) ESE of Little Lake	
July 6	03:27:06	4.7	VI	8.1 mi (13.0 km)	11 mi (18 km) E of Little Lake	
July 6	03:29:29	4.5	VI	6.9 mi (11.1 km)	7.5 mi (12 km) SW of Searles Valley	
July 6	03:47:53	5.5	V	2.1 mi (3.4 km)	9.3 mi (15 km) ESE of Little Lake	
July 6	03:50:59	4.9	V	4.1 mi (6.6 km)	12 mi (19 km) ESE of Little Lake	
July 6	04:13:07	4.8	VI	4.9 mi (7.9 km)	3.7 mi (6 km) SE of Ridgecrest	
July 6	04:18:55	5.4	VII	4.6 mi (7.4 km)	12 mi (20 km) E of Little Lake	
July 6	04:36:55	4.9	VII	1.2 mi (1.9 km)	9.9 mi (16 km) ESE of Little Lake	
July 6	06:01:51	4.6	VI	3.2 mi (5.1 km)	9.3 mi (15 km) E of Little Lake	
July 6	08:32:57	4.6	VI	1.9 mi (3.1 km)	9.9 mi (16 km) SSW of Searles Valley	
July 6	09:28:28	4.9	VII	2.5 mi (4.0 km)	11 mi (17 km) ESE of Little Lake	
July 6	13:06:55	4.5	VI	1.5 mi (2.4 km)	11 mi (18 km) E of Little Lake	
July 6	23:50:41	4.5	VII	1.9 mi (3.0 km)	14 mi (22 km) N of Ridgecrest	
July 7	05:38:15	4.5	VI	6.6 mi (10.6 km)	9.9 mi (16 km) W of Searles Valley	
July 11	00:14:37	4.5	VI	0.5 mi (0.8 km)	9.9 mi (16 km) NNE of Coso Junction	
July 12	13:11:37	4.9	VI	6.2 mi (9.9 km)	5.0 mi (8 km) ENE of Ridgecrest	
July 16	20:15:36	4.5	VI	2.2 mi (3.6 km)	12 mi (19 km) NNE of Ridgecrest	
July 18	03:59:14	4.9	VI	1.6 mi (2.5 km)	5.6 mi (9 km) NE of Coso Junction	
July 26	00:42:47	4.7	VI	2.4 mi (3.8 km)	11 mi (18 km) E of Little Lake	
August 22	20:49:50	5.0	VII	1.5 mi (2.4 km)	11 mi (18 km) E of Little Lake	
June 4	01:32:11	5.5	VIII	4.2 mi (6.8 km)	11 mi (17 km) S of Searles Valley	
July 15	01:19:07	4.6	V	3.9 mi (6.3 km)	8.1 mi (13 km) NE of Ridgecrest	

== Impact ==
=== July 4 foreshock ===
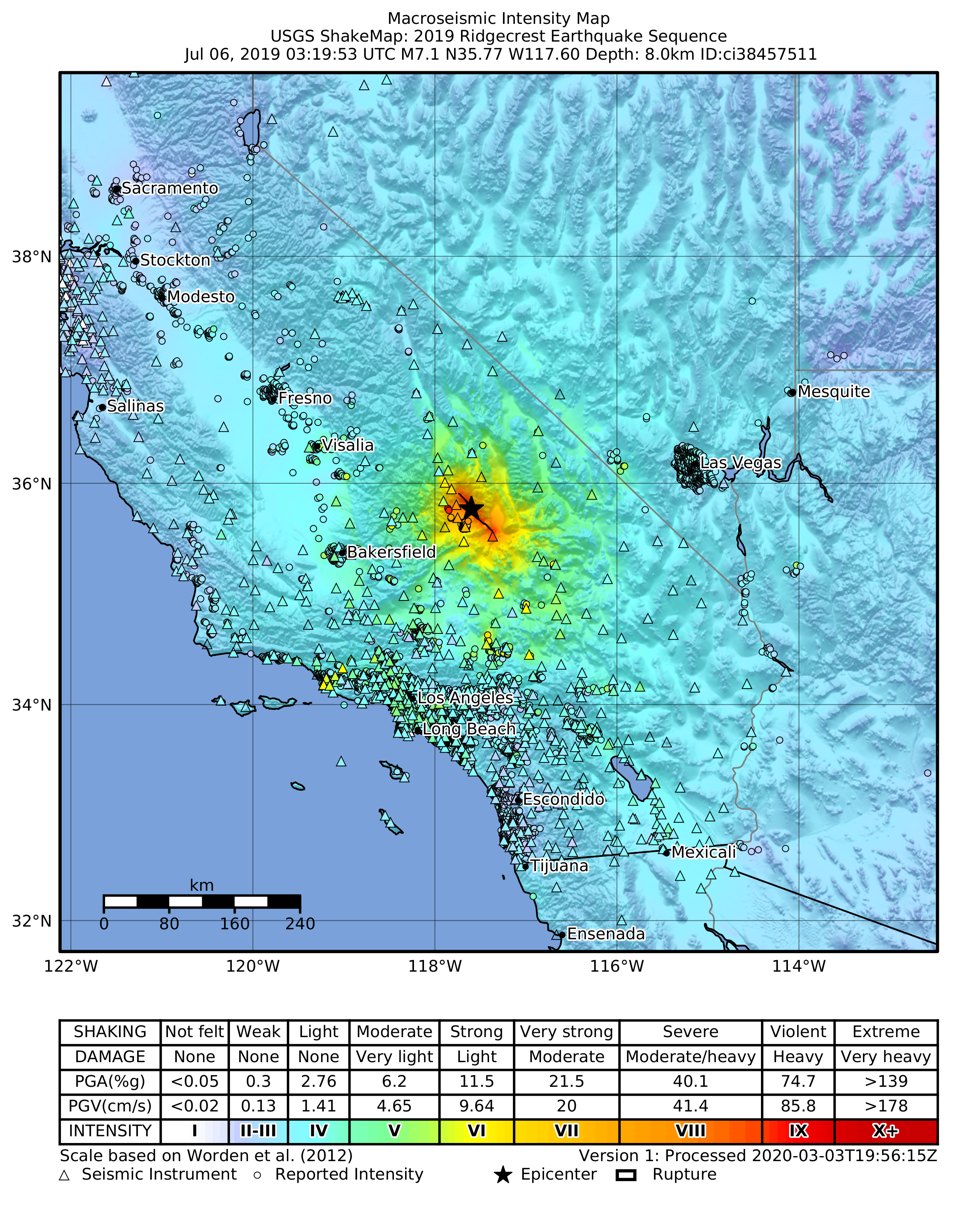
ShakeMap for M7.1 earthquake

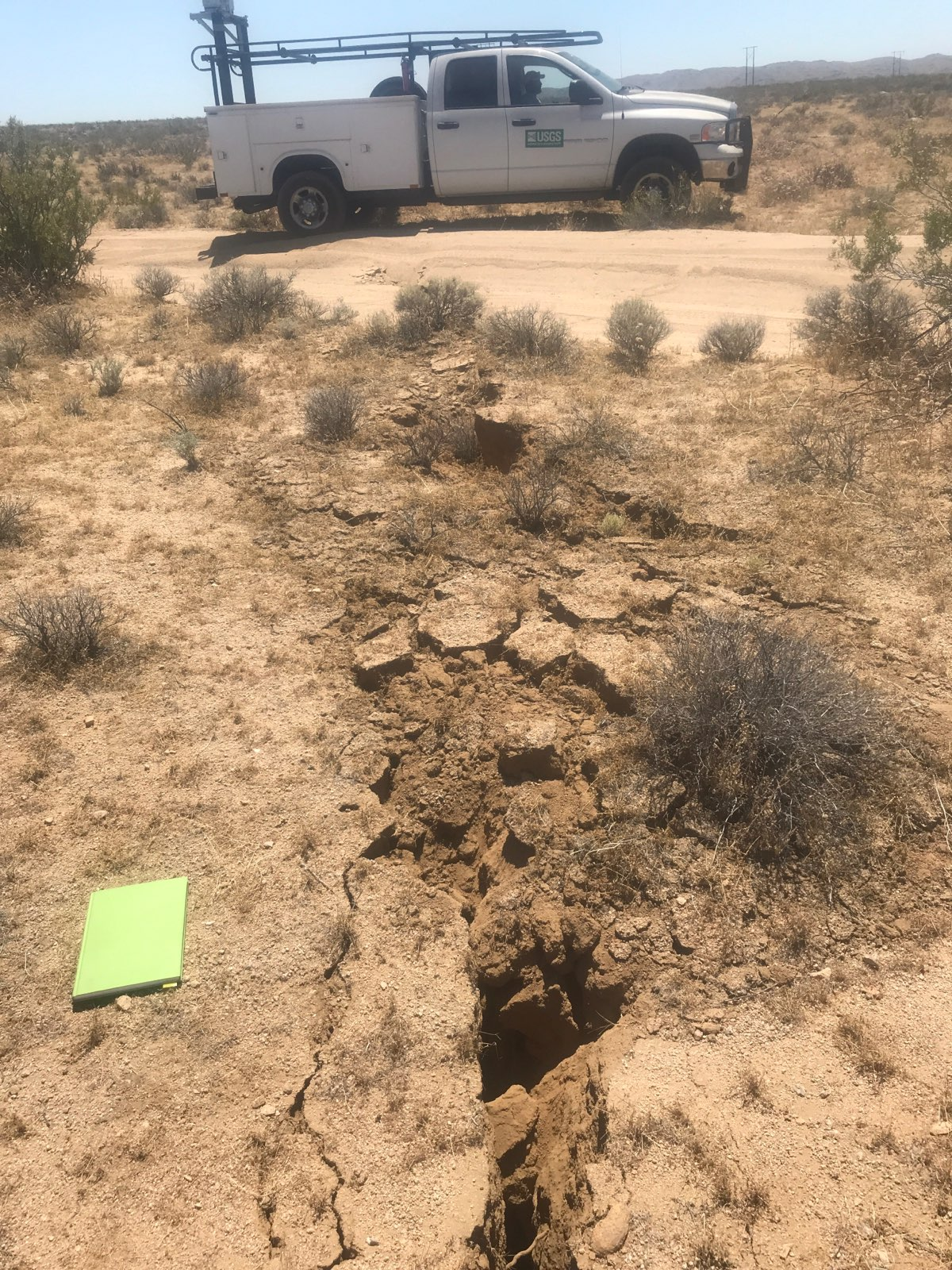
Surface rupture associated with the July 4 earthquake

Structural damage and two building fires—one of which destroyed half of a home—occurred in Ridgecrest. One mobile home was knocked off its foundation and deemed uninhabitable. Around 20 injuries were reported, primarily from shattered glass and falling debris. Some gas lines broke, prompting utility companies to shut off service. Businesses experienced product loss, with goods falling off shelves. Emergency personnel responded to nearly two dozen incidents in the city and opened two shelters. Fifteen patients at Ridgecrest Regional Hospital and residents in several apartment buildings were evacuated. Approximately 6,900 customers lost power near the epicenter: 6,000 in Ridgecrest and 900 in Searles Valley. A 4 in (10 cm) wide crack occurred along State Route 178 near Searles Valley and debris covered part of U.S. Route 395. In Trona, several buildings sustained damage, water and gas lines broke, and power lines fell. Rockslides covered multiple roads around the community, blocking off mountain roads, including the section of State Route 178 that connects Bakersfield with Lake Isabella. In Los Angeles proper, power outages affected the Fashion District and Granada Hills.

One person died in Pahrump, Nevada, over 150 miles away from the epicenter, when a Jeep supported by jackstands he was working under fell upon him.

=== July 5 mainshock ===
Several fires broke out and five injuries were reported after the mainshock hit, most of them in Ridgecrest and Trona. 3,000 people were left without power in Ridgecrest and the rest of Kern County. In Trona, severe damage was reported, with houses knocked off their foundations and numerous gas leaks. Roughly 50 homes were damaged in the town. Multiple rockslides also occurred, making all roads to the city impassable. Water was also in high demand. Caltrans once again closed State Route 178 after new cracks and rockslides had occurred.

Overall damage is estimated in excess of $5.3 billion.

== Aftermath ==
=== July 4 foreshock ===
Hours after the M_{w} 6.4 foreshock, California Governor Gavin Newsom approved an emergency proclamation for Kern County. Local emergency responders such as the Los Angeles Police Department used social media to alert the public that they were aware of the earthquake and to only use 9-1-1 if there was dangerous conditions or injuries. Routine protocol inspections of major infrastructure, including the Los Angeles Aqueduct, were conducted across the Los Angeles metropolitan area. The Ventura County Fire Department dispatched personnel to survey the county for damage. Naval Air Weapons Station China Lake brought in additional personnel to conduct damage assessments. The USGS sent geologists to Kern County soon after the foreshock to look for a surface rupture and collect data. Disneyland suspended ride operations for inspection.

On July 4, seismologist Dr. Lucy Jones said there was a "1 in 20 chance" that the shock would be followed by larger earthquakes over the next few days. Jones also noted that the magnitude of additional shocks would also likely increase, with some possibly exceeding 5 M_{w}.

=== July 5 mainshock ===
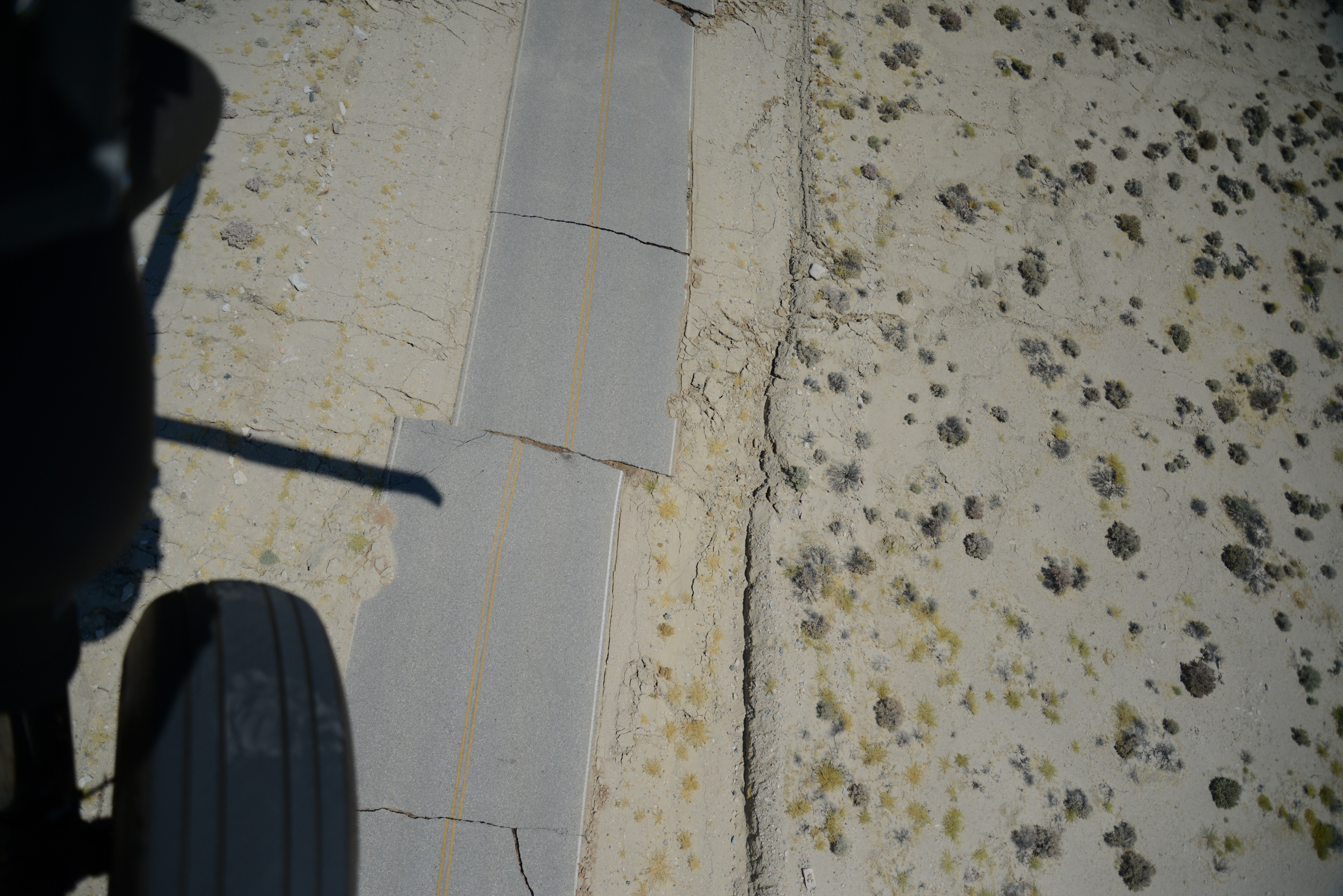
Aerial view of a 3–5 ft (0.91–1.52 m) lateral offset on a service road within Naval Air Weapons Station China Lake

The State Operations Center for the California Governor's Office of Emergency Services (Cal OES) was raised to its highest level by Governor Newsom to coordinate resources. The agency distributed cots, water, and food. Due to temperatures exceeding 100 °F (38 °C), Cal OES established cooling stations in the affected areas. Newsom proclaimed a state of emergency for San Bernardino County on July 6. The California National Guard deployed 200 personnel to assist in relief operations. Power and water service was restored to Ridgecrest and roads were deemed safe by July 7; however, residents were advised to boil water for several days.

Following the shock, (NAWS) Naval Air Weapons Station China Lake evacuated all non essential personnel and declared the base as "not mission capable until further notice" in a statement published on the base's Facebook page on July 6.

In addition, Dr. Lucy Jones said that the odds of another 7 M_{w} or above earthquake was a "1 in 10 chance", with a "50-50" chance of a 6 M_{w} hitting the Owens Valley. The NW-SE fault is believed to now have increased to between 25 and 30 miles in length.

== Earthquake early warning ==
Many residents of Los Angeles County were not pleased when an earthquake early warning mobile app, ShakeAlertLA, did not alert them to either of the Ridgecrest earthquakes, which many people assumed to be a failure. This app, developed by the City of Los Angeles in partnership with the USGS, and released at the beginning of 2019, is intended to give users located in Los Angeles County some tens of seconds of warning of possibly damaging shaking from a non-local earthquake. ShakeAlertLA is triggered by the ShakeAlert system being developed by the USGS that monitors earthquakes across Southern California. When that system detects an earthquake of magnitude 5.0 or greater it calculates the intensity of shaking to be expected in Los Angeles County, factoring in the calculated magnitude and distance of the source.

At the time of the Ridgecrest earthquakes the threshold for issuing an alert was an expected shaking intensity in Los Angeles County of 4 (IV) on the Modified Mercalli Intensity Scale, what is considered "light shaking" with only slight damage (such as cracked plaster). The intensity expected for Thursday's quake (on the 4th) was calculated to be less than that, so no alert was issued. While the actual shaking reached intensity 4 in some areas in the northern part of the county, in other parts the intensity reached only a level 2 or 3, not noticed by many people. The second quake, having a greater magnitude, was felt more strongly, with an intensity of 4.5 in some places, and 3.9 downtown.

According to the City of Los Angeles's Twitter account, the threshold will be lowered after this event.

== Tectonic setting ==
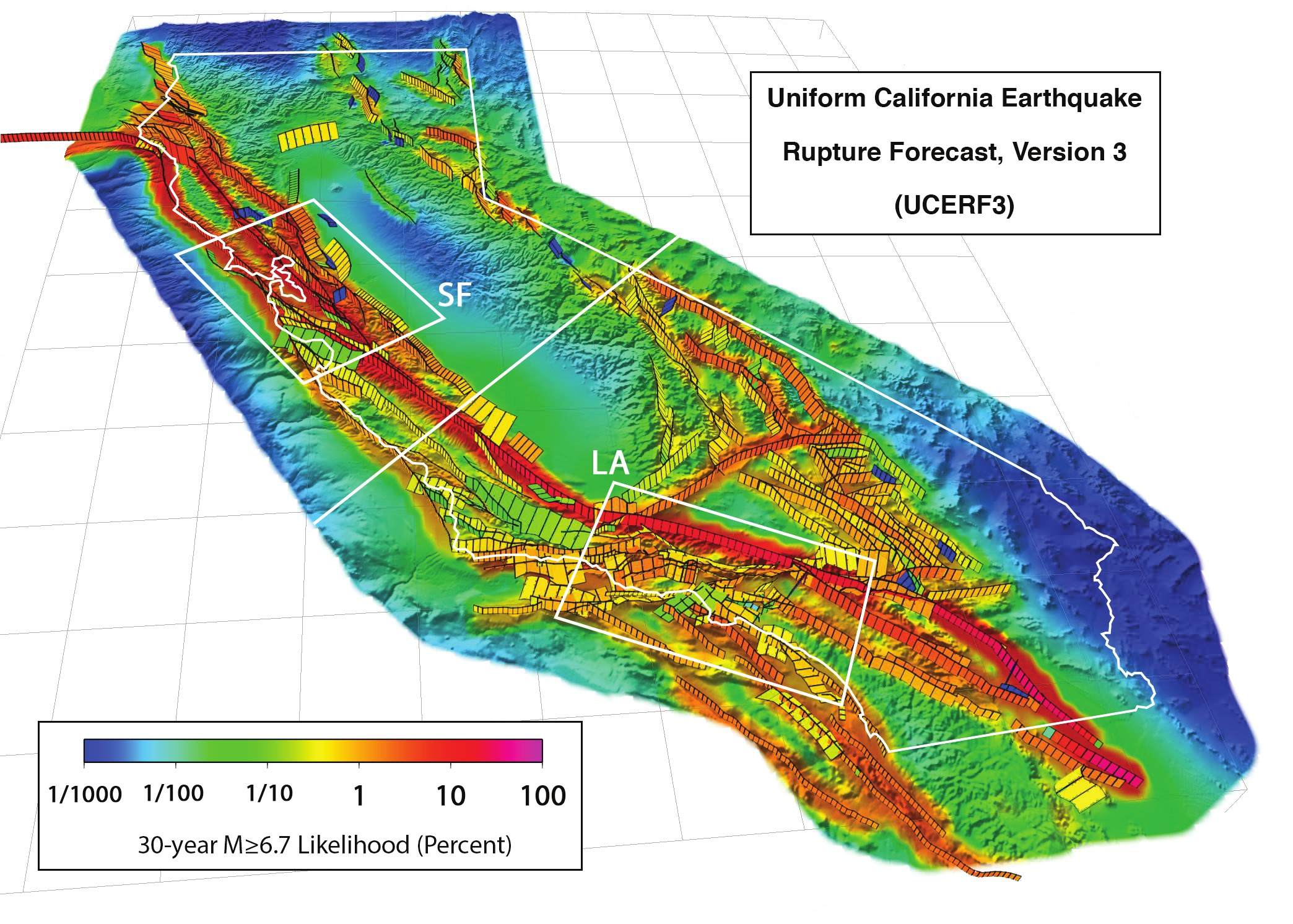
Red marks the major fault zones. The red zone extending northeast from "LA" is the Garlock Fault. Extending northward from the Garlock Fault are (east-to-west) the Death Valley fault zone (orange), Panamint Valley Fault (red), Little Lake and Airport Lake fault zones (short bit of orange). The White Wolf Fault (yellow) parallels the western end of the Garlock Fault, with the Kern Canyon Fault striking north.

The broad context of the Ridgecrest earthquakes is the Eastern California Shear Zone (ECSZ), a seismically active region east of the southern segment of the San Andreas Fault (SAF) and largely coincident with the Mojave Desert, featuring multiple right-lateral strike-slip faults paralleling the SAF. It is transected by the Garlock Fault, extending northeast and then east from the SAF's "Big Bend" to the Death Valley Fault near the Nevada state line, passing Ridgecrest about fifteen miles to the south.

The ECSZ extends north along the east front of the Sierra Nevada Mountains to Walker Lane, a zone of faulting extending into Nevada and northward, where the Sierra Nevada (Sierran) microplate that underlies most of Central California is being torn away from North American continent. Currently approximately one-quarter of the slippage between the Pacific plate and North America is accommodated through the ECSZ and Walker Lane; it is expected that eventually the shearing will consolidate into a new transform fault that will replace the San Andreas Fault.

Along the eastern front of the Sierra Nevada strike-slip faulting happens on the Owens Valley Fault (OVF), part of which ruptured in the 1872 Owens Valley earthquake near Lone Pine. The OVF runs south, largely along U.S. Highway 395, through Bishop, Big Pine, Independence, and Lone Pine to the northern end of Rose Valley and the northwestern corner of the Naval Weapons Center (NWC), where the OVF turns slightly to the east. At the south end of Rose Valley the Little Lake Fault – scene of the 2019 Ridgecrest earthquakes – strikes southeast from near Little Lake (a "locale" at the south end of Rose Valley) to run under the Naval Weapons Center. The surface trace of the Little Lake Fault is mapped through the northeast corner of the City of Ridgecrest, but due to the dip of the fault the epicenters of the 2019 earthquakes are mainly under the NWC, where the Little Lake Fault intersects the broad north–south oriented Airport Lake Fault Zone. The fault continues on to the Garlock Fault about 15 miles southeast of Ridgecrest, just past Searles Station.

East of Rose Valley, between the nearly parallel ends of the Owens Valley and Little Lake faults, lies the Coso Range and Coso Volcanic Field (a notable geothermal field). These lie in a zone where stress and strike-slip movement from the OVF is transferred to various other faults to the south and east, including the Little Lake and Airport Lake faults. The Little Lake Fault has been considered a splay (branch) of the Sierra Nevada (or Sierran) Frontal Fault (SNFF) (formed by the uplift of the Sierra Nevada), but may actually accommodate a significant amount of the right-slip motion of the ECSZ, and (along with the Airport Lake fault zone) may be a major tectonic boundary. South of Little Lake the SNFF continues south along the west side of Indian Wells Valley (where Ridgecrest is situated), then curves west (roughly along California Highway 14) before connecting with the Garlock Fault.

The easterly striking left-slip Garlock Fault south of Ridgecrest is one of California's longest active faults, and marks the boundary between different styles of tectonic deformation. It has been called "somewhat enigmatic" in that it appears to neither offset, nor be offset by, any of the active, NW trending strike-slip faults that cross the ECSZ. In particular, even though the Little Lake Fault is in general alignment with the Blackwater Fault (and its southern extension, the Calico Fault), and a connection is "strongly suspected", and though the aftershocks triggered along the entire length of these faults by the 1992 Landers earthquake suggests a structural continuity, yet the surficial geology shows that "the Blackwater fault ends a few kilometers short of the Garlock fault." How to explain this apparent lack of fault offsetting, and the larger question of how strain (dislocation) is transferred through or around the Garlock Fault, remains unanswered.

Geodetic measurements show that the slip-rate of Garlock Fault is currently less than half of its estimated long-term geological rate. This may indicate that the Garlock Fault is in the late stages of its earthquake cycle.

The Scodie Lineament is a zone of microseismicity extending southwest (paralleling the Garlock Fault) from near Walker Pass (due west of Ridgecrest) to align with the White Wolf Fault, scene of the 1952 Kern County earthquake south of Bakersfield. The nature of the seismicity suggests an early stage in the formation of a strike-slip fault, before localized faulting in the shear zone has connected to form a continuous structure.

== Historical seismicity ==
A large portion of the slippage between the Pacific and North American plates is accommodated in the Eastern California Shear Zone (ECSZ), resulting in many large earthquakes even within the limited span of the historical era. The most notable of these earthquakes is the 1872 Owens Valley earthquake, with an estimated magnitude of 7.4 M_{w} (preferred; other estimates range as high as 7.9). The Owens Valley quake is believed to be the greatest earthquake on record and not just for California, but also for the western continental United States.

In March 1946 an M_{L} 6.3 earthquake struck near Walker Pass (crest of the Sierra Nevada, due west from Ridgecrest), with aftershocks continuing for nearly a year. The 1952 Kern County earthquake (M_{s} 7.5, M_{w} 7.3), considered the biggest earthquake to hit California since the 1906 San Francisco earthquake, occurred on the White Wolf fault south of Bakersfield, and likely connected with the Walker Pass earthquake via the Scodie Lineament.

At the southern end of the ECSZ the 1992 Landers earthquake, at magnitude M_{w} 7.2 (M_{s} 7.8) was also the strongest earthquake in California since 1906. It was followed by a M_{w} 7.2 (M_{S} 7.4) quake on a nearby fault, the 1999 Hector Mine earthquake. Following the Landers earthquake "a well-developed linear pattern of primary and triggered aftershocks" was observed that extended along the Little Lake Fault and into Owens Valley.

Smaller earthquakes are quite common. In the Ridgecrest area these include a M_{L} 5.2 earthquake in October 1961 near Brown (approximately halfway between Ridgecrest and Little Lake) that was felt in Independence and Los Angeles; it was preceded by eight minutes by an M_{L} 3.4 foreshock felt in China Lake (east of Ridgecrest). Additional earthquakes struck near Walker Pass in 1961 (M_{L} 5.3), 1962 (M_{L} 4.9), and 1979 (M_{L} 4.3). In 1977 two small quakes that hit Ridgecrest in February were followed by another pair of small earthquakes in March.

Seismicity in Indian Wells Valley has been characterized by swarms of thousands of earthquakes, some lasting for more than a year. The Ridgecrest earthquake sequence of 1995 was particularly notable, having eight events M ≥ 4.0. This sequence was similar to the 2019 earthquakes in having two main shocks: an M_{L} 5.4 earthquake on August 17 located 11 miles north of Ridgecrest, and an M_{L} 5.8 earthquake on September 20, located about a mile south-southwest of the first earthquake. Another shock on the 24th was M_{L} 4.9. Another similarity with the 2019 events: the first earthquake, although occurring on a north-northwest trending fault (presumably the Little Lake fault), may have involved a northeast-striking fault.

An earlier study noted that successive earthquake sequences here tend to increase in number and magnitude, and migrate southward.

== See also ==
- List of earthquakes in 2019
- List of earthquakes in California
- List of earthquakes in the United States
- 1872 Owens Valley earthquake
- 1952 Kern County earthquake
- 1992 Landers earthquake
- 1999 Hector Mine earthquake, the last earthquake of similar intensity to strike within the state

== Scientific sources ==
- ANSS. "Ridgecrest 2019a: M 6.4 – 12 km SW of Searles Valley, CA". Comprehensive Catalog. U.S. Geological Survey.
- ANSS. "Ridgecrest 2019b: M 5.4 – 16 km W of Searles Valley, CA". Comprehensive Catalog. U.S. Geological Survey.
- ANSS. "Ridgecrest 2019c: M 7.1 – 18 km W of Searles Valley, CA". Comprehensive Catalog. U.S. Geological Survey.
- ANSS. "Ridgecrest 2019d: M 5.5 – 17 km S of Searles Valley, CA". Comprehensive Catalog. U.S. Geological Survey.
- Bawden, Gerald W.; Michael, Andrew J.; Kellog, Lousise M. (July 1999). "Birth of a fault: Connecting the Kern County and Walker Pass, California, earthquakes". Geology. 27 (7): 601–604. Bibcode:1999Geo....27..601B. doi:10.1130/0091-7613(1999)027<0601:BOAFCT>2.3.CO;2. S2CID 11374695.
- Bawden, Gerald W. (January 10, 2001). "Source parameters for the 1952 Kern County earthquake, California: A joint inversion of leveling and triangulation observations". Journal of Geophysical Research. 106 (B1): 771–785. Bibcode:2001JGR...106..771B. doi:10.1029/2000JB900315. S2CID 128677790.
- Dokka, Roy K.; Travis, Christopher J. (February 1990). "Late Cenozoic Strike-slip Faulting in the Mojave Desert, California" (PDF). Tectonics. 9 (2): 311–340. Bibcode:1990Tecto...9..311D. doi:10.1029/TC009i002p00311. Archived from the original (PDF) on July 22, 2021.
- Faulds, James E.; Henry, Christopher D.; Hinz, Nicholas H. (June 2005). "Kinematics of the northern Walker Lane: An incipient transform fault along the Pacific—North American plate boundary" (PDF). Geology. 33 (6): 505–508. Bibcode:2005Geo....33..505F. doi:10.1130/G21274.1.
- Frankel, K.L.; Glazner, A.F.; Kirby, E.; et al. (2008). "Active tectonics of the eastern California shear zone". Field Guide to Plutons, Volcanoes, Faults, Reefs, Dinosaurs, and Possible Glaciation in Selected Areas of Arizona, California, and Nevada. Geological Society of America Field Guide 11. Vol. 11. pp. 43–81. doi:10.1130/2008.fld011(03). ISBN 978-0-8137-0011-3. S2CID 130576078.
- Given, D.D.; Allen, R.M.; Baltay, A.S.; et al. (2018). "Revised technical implementation plan for the Shake Alert system—An earthquake early warning system for the West Coast of the United States". Revised technical implementation plan for the ShakeAlert system: An earthquake early warning system for the West Coast of the United States (Report). Open-File Report 2018-1155. United States Geological Survey. doi:10.3133/ofr20181155. [Supersedes USGS Open-File Report 2014–1097.]
- Hauksson, Egill; Hutton, Kate; Kanamori, Hiroo; Jones, Lucille (November–December 1995). "Preliminary Report on the 1995 Ridgecrest Earthquake Sequence in Eastern California" (PDF). Seismological Research Letters. 66 (6): 54–60. Bibcode:1995SeiRL..66f..54H. doi:10.1785/gssrl.66.6.54.
- Hauksson, Egill; Unruh, Jeffrey (2007). "Regional tectonics of the Coso geothermal area along the intracontinental plate boundary in central eastern California: Three-dimensional V_{p} and V_{p}/V_{s}s models, spatial-temporal seismicity patterns, and seismogenic deformation" (PDF). Journal of Geophysical Research. 112 (B6). Bibcode:2007JGRB..112.6309H. doi:10.1029/2006JB004721. S2CID 43988688.
- Hearn, Elizabeth Harding; Humphreys, Eugene D. (November 10, 1998). "Kinematics of the southern Walker Lane Belt and motion of the Sierra Nevada block, California". Journal of Geophysical Research. 103 (B11): 27, 033–27, 049. Bibcode:1998JGR...10327033H. doi:10.1029/98JB01390. S2CID 140197686.
- Hough, Susan E.; Hutton, Kate (April 2008). "Revisiting the 1872 Owens Valley, California, Earthquake" (PDF). Bulletin of the Seismological Society of America. 98 (3): 931–948. Bibcode:2008BuSSA..98..931H. doi:10.1785/0120070186. S2CID 18193135.
- International Seismological Centre. ISC-EHB Bulletin. Thatcham, United Kingdom.
- International Seismological Centre. Bulletin of the ISC. Thatcham, United Kingdom.
- McClusky, S. C.; Bjornstad, S. C.; Hager, B. H.; King, R. W.; Meade, B. J.; Miller, M. M.; Monastero, F. C.; Souter, B. J. (September 1, 2001). "Present Day Kinematics of the Eastern California Shear Zone from a Geodetically Constrained Block Model". Geophysical Research Letters. 28 (17): 3369–3372. Bibcode:2001GeoRL..28.3369M. doi:10.1029/2001GL013091. S2CID 129027699.
- Miller, M. M.; Johnson, D. J.; Dixon, T. H.; Dokka, R. K. (February 10, 2001). "Refined kinematics of the Eastern California shear zone from GPS observations, 1993-1998". Journal of Geophysical Research. 106 (B2): 2245–2263. Bibcode:2001JGR...106.2245M. doi:10.1029/2000JB900328.
- Roquemore, Glenn R. (March 1981a). Active Faults and Associated Tectonic Stress in the Coso Range, California (PDF) (Thesis).
- Roquemore, G. R.; Simila, G. W. (June 1994). "Aftershocks from the 28 June 1992 Landers Earthquake: Northern Mojave Desert to the Coso Volcanic Field, California". Bulletin of the Seismological Society of America. 84 (3): 854–862.
- Roquemore, Gerald W.; Zellmer, John T. (1983). "Tectonics, Seismicity, and Volcanism at The Naval Weapons Center". Naval Research Reviews. 35: 3–9. Archived from the original on September 13, 2020.
- Shelly, David R. (January 22, 2019). "A High-Resolution Seismic Catalog for the Initial 2019 Ridgecrest Earthquake Sequence: Foreshocks, Aftershocks, and Faulting Complexity". Seismological Research Letters. 91 (4): 1971–1978. doi:10.1785/0220190309. S2CID 213982383.
- Stover, Carl W.; Coffman, Jerry L. (1993). Seismicity of the United States, 1568-1989 (Revised) (PDF). Professional Paper 1527. United States Geological Survey. doi:10.3133/pp1527.
- Unruh, Jeffry; Humphrey, James; Barron, Andrew (April 2003). "Transtensional model for the Sierra Nevada frontal fault system". Geology. 31 (4): 327–330. doi:10.1130/0091-7613(2003)031<0327:TMFTSN>2.0.CO;2. S2CID 128940084.
- Wesnousky, Steven G. (June 2005). "Active faulting in the Walker Lane". Tectonics. 24 (3): n/a. Bibcode:2005Tecto..24.3009W. doi:10.1029/2004TC001645.
- Zellmer, John T. (November 1987). Engineering and Environmental Geology of the Indian-Wells Valley Area (PDF). NNWC Technical Publication 6834. Naval Weapons Center, China Lake. Archived (PDF) from the original on July 25, 2019.
