= The Daily Independent =

The Daily Independent may refer to:

- The Daily Independent (Ashland newspaper), a daily newspaper published in Kentucky, USA
- The Daily Independent (Lagos newspaper), a newspaper published in Lagos, Nigeria
- The Daily Independent (Ridgecrest), a daily newspaper published in California, USA
- The Daily Independent, a daily newspaper published in Sun City, Arizona

== See also ==
- The Independent, a daily newspaper published in the United Kingdom
- The Independent (Bangladesh newspaper), a daily newspaper published in Dhaka, Bangladesh
- Irish Independent, Ireland's largest daily newspaper
- Independent Tribune, a newspaper published in Concord, North Carolina, USA
- Marin Independent Journal, formerly the San Rafael Daily Independent in California, USA
- Gallup Independent, a newspaper published in Gallup, New Mexico, USA
