= Ridgecrest Heights, California =

Census-designated place in Kern County, California, U.S.

- Unincorporated community Census-designated place
- Location in California Ridgecrest Heights, California (the United States)
- Coordinates: 35°36′6.84″N 117°42′15.05″W
- Country: United States
- State: California
- County: Kern

Area
  - Total: 0.604 sq mi (1.56 km^{2})
  - Land: 0.604 sq mi (1.56 km^{2})
  - Water: 0 sq mi (0 km^{2})
- Elevation: 2,428 ft (740 m)

Population (2020)
  - Total: 380
  - Density: 630/sq mi (240/km^{2})
- Time zone: UTC-8 (Pacific)
  - Summer (DST): UTC-7 (PDT)
- GNIS feature ID: 2804429

Ridgecrest Heights is a census-designated place (CDP) in northeastern Kern County, California, United States, bordered in the north and east by Ridgecrest. The population of Ridgecrest Heights was 380 in the 2020 census.

== Geography ==
Ridgecrest Heights is located 2.34 mi (3.76 km) southwest of Ridgecrest, California in the Indian Wells Valley at an elevation of 2,428 ft (740 m).

== Demographics ==
Historical population
Census	Pop.	Note	%±
2020	380		—
U.S. Decennial Census; 1860–1870 1880-1890; 1900 1910 1920; 1930 1940 1950; 1960 1970 1980; 1990 2000 2010; 2020

Ridgecrest Heights first appeared as a census designated place in the 2020 U.S. census.

=== 2020 Census ===
Ridgecrest Heights CDP, California – Racial and ethnic composition Note: the US Census treats Hispanic/Latino as an ethnic category. This table excludes Latinos from the racial categories and assigns them to a separate category. Hispanics/Latinos may be of any race.
Race / Ethnicity (NH = Non-Hispanic)	Pop 2020	% 2020
White alone (NH)	245	64.47%
Black or African American alone (NH)	4	1.05%
Native American or Alaska Native alone (NH)	3	0.79%
Asian alone (NH)	0	0.00%
Native Hawaiian or Pacific Islander alone (NH)	0	0.00%
Other race alone (NH)	1	0.26%
Mixed race or Multiracial (NH)	25	6.58%
Hispanic or Latino (any race)	102	26.84%
Total	380	100.00%
