= Burroughs High School =

Burroughs High School may refer to:

- John Burroughs High School in Burbank, California
- Sherman E Burroughs High School in Ridgecrest, California
- John Burroughs School in Ladue, Missouri
