= Sierra Sands Unified School District =

School district in Kern County, California

Location
- Indian Wells Valley

District information
- Type: Public
- Grades: PK - 12
- Established: 1960; 66 years ago
- Superintendent: Dr. April Moore

Students and staff
- Teachers: 377 (2008)

Other information
- Website: District Website

The Sierra Sands Unified School District is located in the Indian Wells Valley of California. It was established in 1960. It serves all of Indian Wells Valley, including the cities of Ridgecrest, Inyokern, China Lake, Johannesburg and Kernville. The District serves an estimated 50,000 residents. Sierra Sands has six elementary schools, two middle schools and two high schools.

== List of schools ==
Courtesy of www.ssusd.org - original
North County School later became Sherman E Burroughs High School in 1944. It moved to a new site in 1960 where the building became Murray Middle School (now closed). The first schools were Faller and Pierce Elementary, and Monroe Middle.

- Adult School

Sierra Vista Educational Center
1327 N. Norma, Rm. 143
Ridgecrest, CA 93555

- Burroughs High School

500 French Ave.
Ridgecrest, CA 93555

- Mesquite High School

140 Drummond Ave.
Ridgecrest, CA 93555

- James Monroe Middle School

340 W Church Ave.
Ridgecrest, CA 93555

- Murray Middle School

200 Drummond Ave.
Ridgecrest, CA 93555

- Faller Elementary School

1500 Upjohn Ave.
Ridgecrest, CA 93555

- Gateway Elementary School (special studies)

501 S. Gateway Blvd.
Ridgecrest, CA 93555

- Inyokern Elementary School

6601 Locust Ave.
Inyokern, CA

- Las Flores Elementary School

720 Las Flores Ave.
Ridgecrest, CA 93555

- Pierce Elementary School

674 N. Gold Canyon St.
Ridgecrest, CA 93555

- Rand Elementary School

P.O. Box 157 (Coeur d' Alene Ave. & Elmo St.)
Johannesburg, CA 93528-0157

- Richmond Elementary School

1206 Kearsarge Ave.
Ridgecrest, CA 93555

Closed schools: Vieweg Elementary (in mid 2010s) - replaced by Las Flores.

== See also ==
- List of school districts in California
