= China Lake Acres, California =

China Lake Acres
- Unincorporated Community; Census Designated Place
- Location in Kern County and the state of California

- Location in the United States
- Coordinates: 35°38′26″N 117°45′50″W
- Country: United States
- State: California
- County: Kern

Government
  - State senator: Shannon Grove (R)
  - Assemblymember: Stan Ellis (R)
  - U. S. rep.: Vince Fong (R)

Area
  - Total: 5.21 sq mi (13.49 km^{2})
  - Land: 5.21 sq mi (13.49 km^{2})
  - Water: 0 sq mi (0.00 km^{2}) 0.019%
- Elevation: 2,431 ft (741 m)

Population (2020)
  - Total: 1,757
  - Density: 337.3/sq mi (130.23/km^{2})
- Time zone: UTC-8 (PST)
  - Summer (DST): UTC-7 (PDT)
- ZIP code: 93555
- Area codes: 442/760
- FIPS code: 06-13157
- GNIS feature ID: 1853382

China Lake Acres is a census-designated place (CDP) in Kern County, California, United States. The population was 1,757 at the 2020 census, down from 1,876 at the 2010 census.

== Geography ==
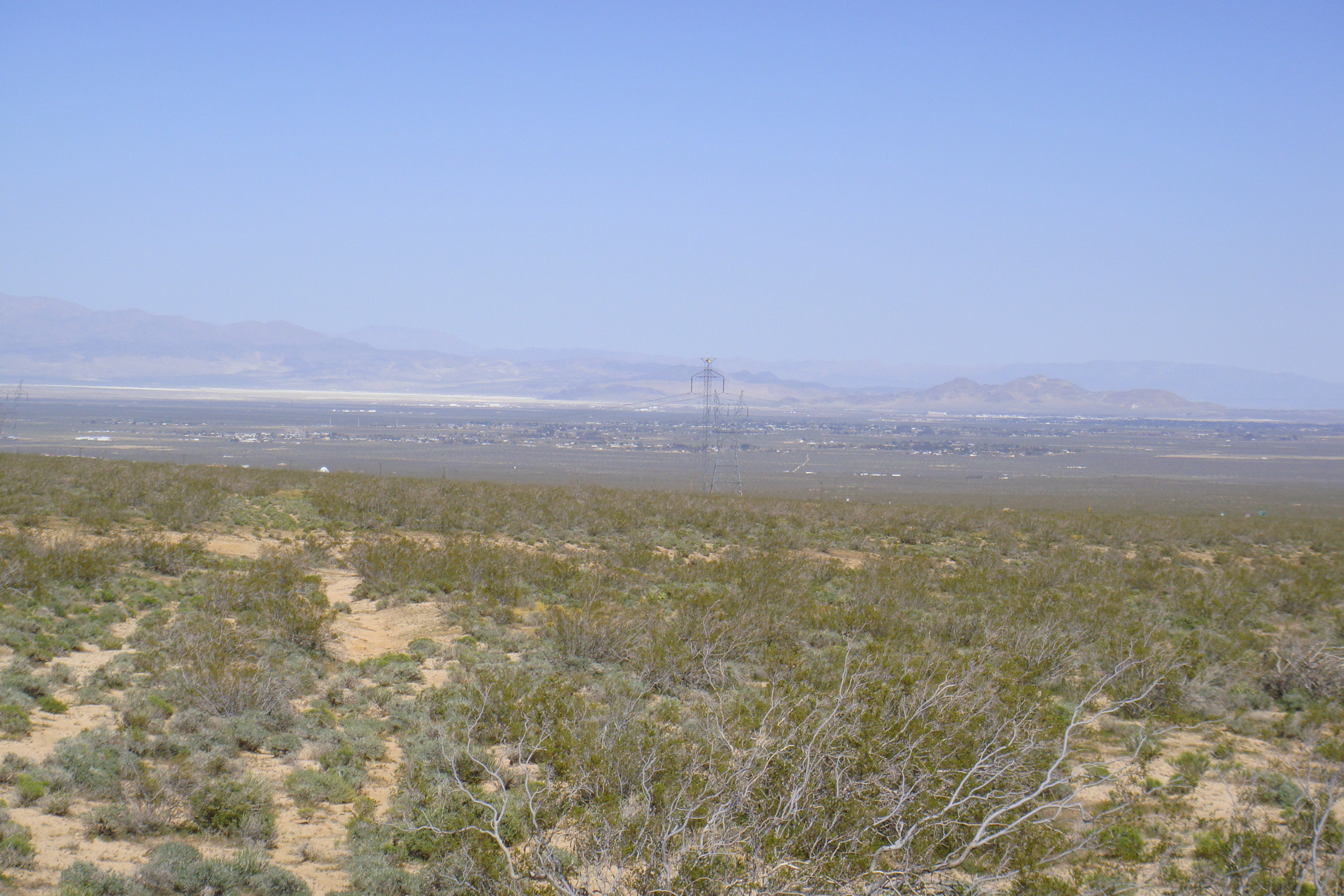
Indian Wells Valley, showing Ridgecrest, California and the China Lake area.

China Lake Acres is located at 35°38′26″N 117°45′50″W.

According to the United States Census Bureau, this CDP (census-designated place), commonly referred to by local residents as The Acres, has a total area of 5.211 square miles (13.496 km^{2}), over 99% land.

== Demographics ==
Historical population
Census	Pop.	Note	%±
2000	1,761		—
2010	1,876		6.5%
2020	1,757		−6.3%
U.S. Decennial Census; 1860–1870 1880-1890; 1900 1910 1920; 1930 1940 1950; 1960 1970 1980; 1990 2000 2010; 2020

China Lake Acres first appeared as a census designated place in the 2000 U.S. census.

=== Racial and ethnic composition ===
China Lake Acres CDP, California – Racial and ethnic composition Note: the US Census treats Hispanic/Latino as an ethnic category. This table excludes Latinos from the racial categories and assigns them to a separate category. Hispanics/Latinos may be of any race.
Race / Ethnicity (NH = Non-Hispanic)	Pop 2000	Pop 2010	Pop 2020	% 2000	% 2010	% 2020
White alone (NH)	1,493	1,482	1,218	84.78%	79.00%	69.32%
Black or African American alone (NH)	21	35	37	1.19%	1.87%	2.11%
Native American or Alaska Native alone (NH)	13	13	29	0.74%	0.69%	1.65%
Asian alone (NH)	14	14	14	0.80%	0.75%	0.80%
Native Hawaiian or Pacific Islander alone (NH)	4	7	2	0.23%	0.37%	0.11%
Other race alone (NH)	2	1	9	0.11%	0.05%	0.51%
Mixed race or Multiracial (NH)	49	59	121	2.78%	3.14%	6.89%
Hispanic or Latino (any race)	165	265	327	9.37%	14.13%	18.61%
Total	1,761	1,876	1,757	100.00%	100.00%	100.00%

=== 2020 census ===
As of the 2020 census, China Lake Acres had a population of 1,757 and a population density of 337.3 inhabitants per square mile (130.2/km^{2}). The median age was 42.9 years. The age distribution was 374 people (21.3%) under age 18, 131 people (7.5%) aged 18 to 24, 410 people (23.3%) aged 25 to 44, 502 people (28.6%) aged 45 to 64, and 340 people (19.4%) who were 65 years of age or older. For every 100 females, there were 104.3 males, and for every 100 females age 18 and over, there were 110.5 males.

The whole population lived in households. There were 716 households, out of which 184 (25.7%) had children under the age of 18 living in them, 315 (44.0%) were married-couple households, 50 (7.0%) were cohabiting couple households, 163 (22.8%) had a female householder with no spouse or partner present, and 188 (26.3%) had a male householder with no spouse or partner present. 228 households (31.8%) were one-person households, and 106 (14.8%) had someone living alone who was 65 years of age or older. The average household size was 2.45, and there were 430 families (60.1% of all households).

There were 850 housing units at an average density of 163.2 units per square mile (63.0 units/km^{2}), of which 716 (84.2%) were occupied. Of occupied units, 543 (75.8%) were owner-occupied and 173 (24.2%) were occupied by renters. Of all housing units, 15.8% were vacant. The homeowner vacancy rate was 2.2% and the rental vacancy rate was 12.6%.

0.0% of residents lived in urban areas, while 100.0% lived in rural areas.

=== Income and poverty ===
In 2023, the US Census Bureau estimated that the median household income was $67,438, and the per capita income was $45,774. About 16.9% of families and 24.0% of the population were below the poverty line.

=== 2010 census ===
At the 2010 census China Lake Acres had a population of 1,876. The population density was 360.0 inhabitants per square mile (139.0/km^{2}). The racial makeup of China Lake Acres was 1,601 (85.3%) White, 35 (1.9%) African American, 29 (1.5%) Native American, 16 (0.9%) Asian, 7 (0.4%) Pacific Islander, 84 (4.5%) from other races, and 104 (5.5%) from two or more races. Hispanic or Latino of any race were 265 people (14.1%).

The whole population lived in households, no one lived in non-institutionalized group quarters and no one was institutionalized.

There were 755 households, 219 (29.0%) had children under the age of 18 living in them, 376 (49.8%) were opposite-sex married couples living together, 87 (11.5%) had a female householder with no husband present, 48 (6.4%) had a male householder with no wife present. There were 49 (6.5%) unmarried opposite-sex partnerships, and 1 (0.1%) same-sex married couples or partnerships. 204 households (27.0%) were one person and 78 (10.3%) had someone living alone who was 65 or older. The average household size was 2.48. There were 511 families (67.7% of households); the average family size was 2.95.

The age distribution was 433 people (23.1%) under the age of 18, 127 people (6.8%) aged 18 to 24, 410 people (21.9%) aged 25 to 44, 593 people (31.6%) aged 45 to 64, and 313 people (16.7%) who were 65 or older. The median age was 44.0 years. For every 100 females, there were 102.2 males. For every 100 females age 18 and over, there were 103.2 males.

There were 855 housing units at an average density of 164.1 per square mile, of the occupied units 561 (74.3%) were owner-occupied and 194 (25.7%) were rented. The homeowner vacancy rate was 1.6%; the rental vacancy rate was 6.2%. 1,337 people (71.3% of the population) lived in owner-occupied housing units and 539 people (28.7%) lived in rental housing units.
