= Ted Bachman =

American football player (1951–2023)

No. 10, 46, 47
- Position: Defensive back

Personal information
- Born: January 19, 1951; Pensacola, Florida, U.S.
- Died: September 28, 2023 (aged 72); Los Angeles, California, U.S.
- Listed height: 6 ft 0 in (1.83 m)
- Listed weight: 190 lb (86 kg)

Career information
- High school: Burroughs (Ridgecrest, California)
- College: Porterville, New Mexico State
- NFL draft: 1973: undrafted

Career history
- Calgary Stampeders (1973–1974); Miami Dolphins (1976)*; Cleveland Browns (1976)*; Seattle Seahawks (1976); Miami Dolphins (1976); New England Patriots (1978)*
- * Offseason or practice squad member only
- Stats at Pro Football Reference

Theodore Lewis Bachman Jr. (January 19, 1951 – September 28, 2023) was an American professional football defensive back who played one season in the National Football League (NFL) with the Seattle Seahawks and Miami Dolphins. Bachman played college football at New Mexico State University. He also played for the Calgary Stampeders of the Canadian Football League (CFL).

== Early life and college ==
Theodore Lewis Bachman Jr. was born on January 19, 1951, in Pensacola, Florida. He attended Sherman E. Burroughs High School in Ridgecrest, California and graduated in 1969.

Bachman first played college football at Porterville College before transferring to play for the New Mexico State Aggies of New Mexico State University.

== Professional career ==
In 1973, Bachman followed New Mexico State head coach Jim Wood to the Calgary Stampeders of the Canadian Football League (CFL). Bachman played in five games for the Stampeders in 1973. He appeared in 12 games during the 1974 season, recording five interceptions for 65 yards and ten kickoff returns for 254 yards. He was released by the Stampeders on July 19, 1975, in what the Canadian Press called a surprising decision. Bachman stated that he would try to sign with another CFL team or possibly the San Antonio Wings of the World Football League.

Bachman was signed by the Miami Dolphins in 1976, but was later waived and claimed off waivers by the Cleveland Browns. On September 7, 1976, he was traded to the expansion Seattle Seahawks for Terry Brown. Bachman played in five games for the Seahawks before being released on October 12, 1976.

Bachman signed with the Miami Dolphins on October 22, 1976, and appeared in eight games for the Dolphins during the 1976 season. He was released on August 29, 1977.

Bachman signed with the New England Patriots in 1978 but was later released.

== Personal life ==
Bachman later worked as a Certified Public Accountant, including a stint as the head controller for the Los Angeles Coliseum. He died on September 28, 2023, in Los Angeles, California.
