= Ridgecrest Regional Hospital =

Hospital in Ridgecrest, California

Geography
- Location: 1081 N. China Lake Blvd., Ridgecrest, California, United States
- Coordinates: 35.64061°N 117.6711°W

Organization
- Care system: Public
- Type: Community

Services
- Emergency department: Level IV trauma center
- Beds: 25

History
- Founded: 1945

Links
- Website: www.rrh.org
- Lists: Hospitals in California

Ridgecrest Regional Hospital is a hospital located in Ridgecrest, California which is just east of the Southern Sierra Mountains in the Indian Wells Valley. It has two specialty units, including pediatric and intensive care. The hospital was established in the mid-1940s out of a need for medical care for the workforce of the growing China Lake Naval Weapons Station.It is the only regional healthcare system in the area and provides a variety of services to the region. Jim Suver is the CEO of the hospital.

== Services ==
Ridgecrest Regional Hospital provides family medicine services through the Southern Sierra Medical Clinic and Rural Health Clinic. The hospital offers the following:

- Cardiology/Cardiac Rehab
- Cardiopulmonary/Respiratory Care
- Case Management/Social Services
- Critical Care Unit
- Education
- Emergency Services
- Home Health
- Maternal/Child/Family Unit
- Pastoral Care
- Patient Care Conferences
- Radiology
- Rehabilitation Services
- Surgery and Outpatient Services
- Telemedicine

== History ==
The hospital was established by Dr. Thomas Drummond in 1945 as Ridgecrest Community Hospital. The hospital has seen several expansions over the years: a new wing was added in 1968; an intensive-care unit in 1976; and a four-phased major expansion was begun in 1987.

== Financial Situation ==
In August 2022 Ridgecrest Regional Hospital announces that it would be closing down its cancer center due to a shortage of oncologists

In August 2023, The California Department of Health Care Access and Information awarded Ridgecrest Regional Hospital $5.5 million in interest-free loans as a part of a Distressed Hospital Loan Program.

In November 2023, the hospital announced the end of their labor delivery program due to a shortage of obstetric providers. Soon after in announced that it will be laying off employees due to financial hardship. The situation is concerning for nearby residents who don't have alternatives for medical care.
