= The Daily Independent (Ridgecrest) =

American daily newspaper

- Type: Daily newspaper
- Format: Broadsheet
- Owner: Mountain and Desert Media
- Publisher: John Watkins
- Editor: Jessica Weston (city) Lauren Jennings (sports)
- Headquarters: 224 East Ridgecrest Boulevard, Ridgecrest, California 93555, United States
- Website: ridgecrestca.com

The Daily Independent is a daily newspaper serving Ridgecrest, California, United States.

== History ==
In 1926, The Daily Independent was founded. In 2013, Gannett subsidiary Gatehouse Media, which owned the Independent, was awarded a contract to print The Rocketeer 2. The Rocketeer is a small newspaper whose focus is Naval Air Weapons Station China Lake. In 2021, The Daily Independent was bought by Mountain and Desert Media.
