= Sherman E. Burroughs High School =

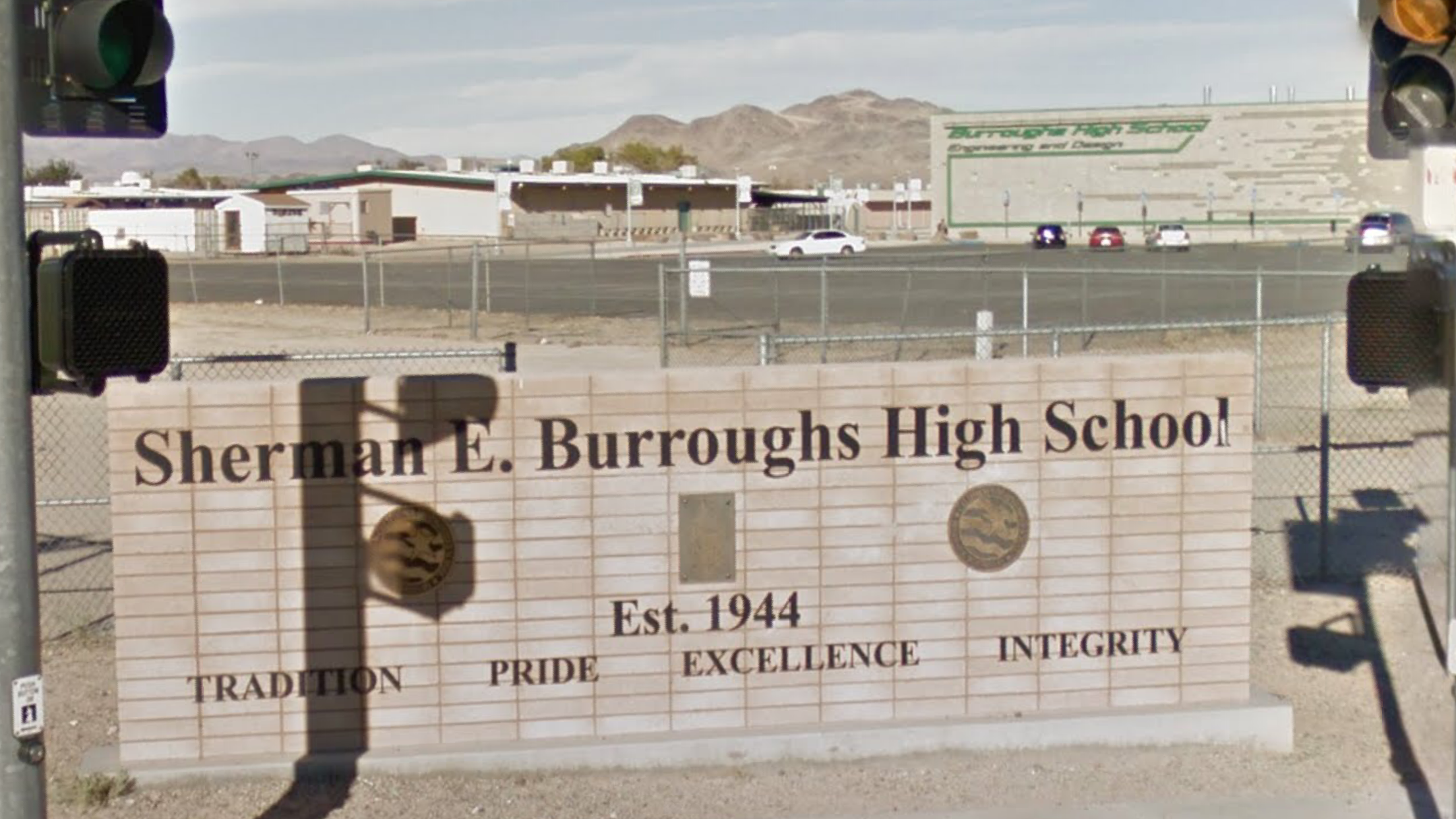
- Welcome sign at Sherman E. Burroughs High School's entrance.

Location
- 500 French Street; Ridgecrest, California 93555; United States; 35.63532°N 117.6594°W

Information
- Type: Public
- Established: 1945
- School district: Sierra Sands Unified School District
- Principal: Carrie Cope
- Staff: 74.92 (FTE)
- Faculty: WASC Accredited
- Grades: 9-12
- Enrollment: 1,518 (2023-2024)
- Student to teacher ratio: 20.26
- Color
- Mascot: Burro
- Website: Burroughs HS Web Site; Burro Athletics @ Maxpreps

Sherman E. Burroughs High School is a public high school located in Ridgecrest, California. Established in 1945, the school is located in the upper Mojave Desert and is adjacent to the Naval Air Weapons Station China Lake. It derives its name from U.S. Navy officer Admiral Sherman E. Burroughs, who served as the first commanding officer of the base at China Lake (then known as the Naval Ordnance Test Station at China Lake). The school's mascot, the Burro, is taken from the animal which was imported to the area.

Burroughs was originally housed at what was later renamed Murray Junior High, later Middle School, after Earl Murray, then principal of Burroughs, aboard the base, but moved to its current site in the Fall of 1959.

Burroughs High School is a member of the Sierra Sands Unified School District (S.S.U.S.D.).

== Demographics ==
In the 2023-24 school year, 442 students were enrolled in grade 9, 393 in grade 10, 364 in grade 11, and 339 in grade 12, totaling up to 1,518 students. Of those students enrolled, 47.7% were female and 51.6% male. 1.2% of students were American Indian or Alaska Native, 2.7% Asian, 6.3% Black or African American, 2.2% Filipino, 32.2% Hispanic or Latino, 0.6% Native Hawaiian or Pacific Islander, 3.6% Two or More Races, 50.7% White, 4.6% English Learners, 0.9% Foster Youth, 3% Homeless, 48.9% Socioeconomically Disadvantaged, and 14.7% Students with Disabilities.

== History ==
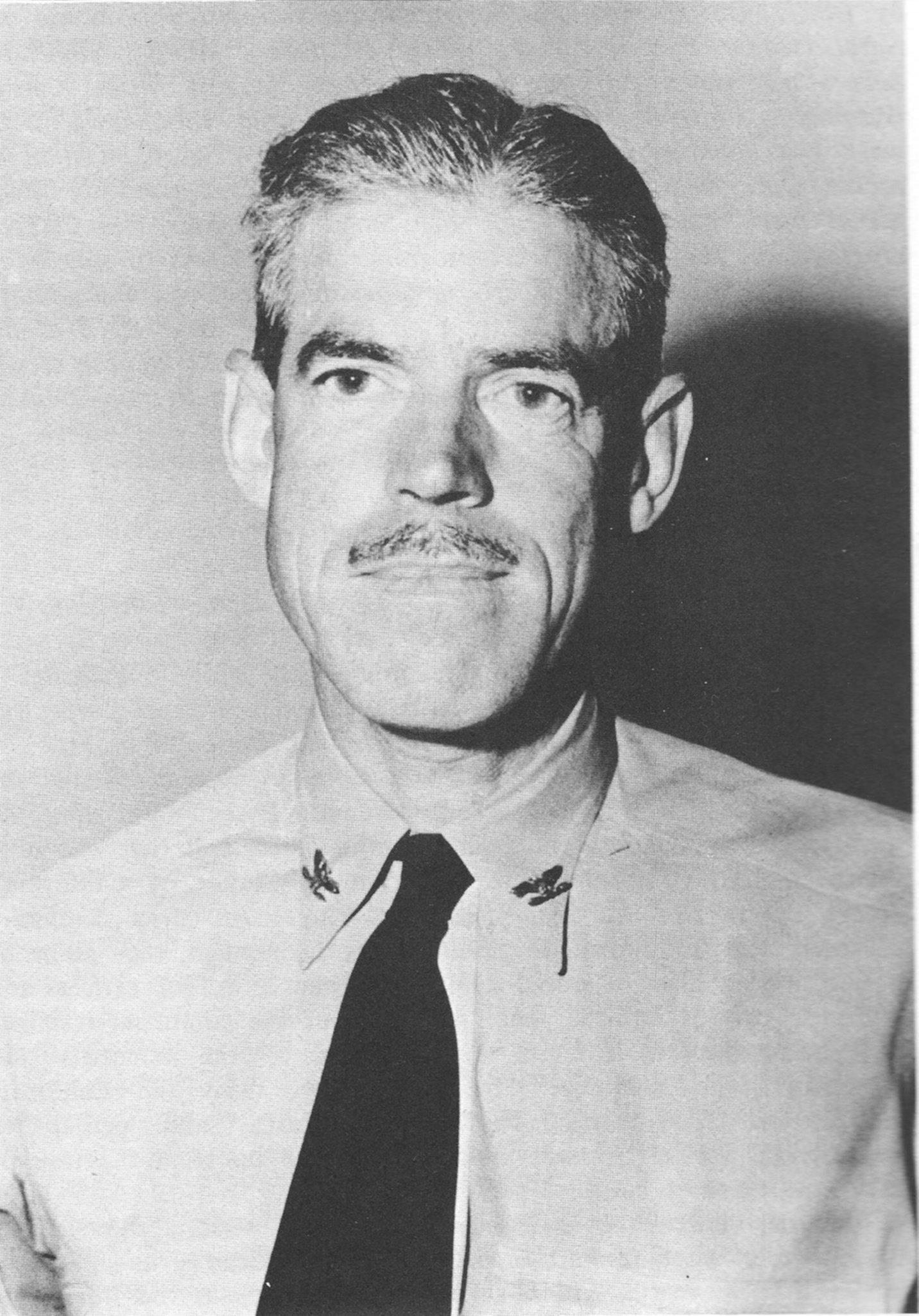
Namesake RADM Sherman E. Burroughs

The Secretary of the Navy created the Naval Ordnance Test Station at China Lake on Nov. 8, 1943, and the need for an educational system for the families stationed at the base was included in the plans. Working with the California Department of Education and the legislature, the China Lake School District was established on May 22, 1944.

After additional meetings and planning, construction began in May 1945 and was completed in November of that same year. F. R. Wegner was the first principal and Earl Murray was Vice Principal.

The buildings and Quonset huts that made up the original campus of Burroughs High School later became Murray Middle School as Burroughs moved to where it is today.

== Academics ==
Recognition & Awards

- Burroughs was honored as a California Distinguished School in 2005 & 2011.

Principals

- 1945–1946 – F. R. Wegner
- 1947–1960 – Earl Murray
- 1961–1969 – Kenneth Westcott
- 1970–1973 – John Cissne
- 1974–1979 – Hal Reid
- 1980–1990 – Michael McGrath
- 1991–1993 – Joseph C. Carlson
- 1994–1996 – Jim Roulsten
- 1997–1998 – Ken Bergevin
- 1999–2008 – Ernie Bell
- 2008–2014 – Dave Ostash
- 2014–2019 – Bryan Auld
- 2019–Present – Carrie Cope

== Athletics ==
During its history, Burroughs High School has accumulated seven California Interscholastic Federation championships.

- Boys' Basketball (1958, Northern Region)
- Boys' Basketball (1982, Southern Section 2A)
- Boys' Swimming (1994, Southern Section Division III)
- Boys' Swimming (1995, Southern Section Division III)
- Boys' Swimming (1996, Southern Section Division III)
- Girls' Swimming (2003, Southern Section Division III)
- Boys' Football (2005, Southern Section Division VIII)

1958 Boys' Basketball Championship

It marked the first major championship in any sport for the green and white and the boys varsity basketball team, known then as the 'A' squad, ran off a 21-3 record on their way to the section championship. In the 4-team Desert Inyo League, the Burros went a perfect 12-0 over Palmdale, Victor Valley and Barstow.
Center Jay Carty led the team and was the first athlete from the Indian Wells Valley to play professional sports. After playing at Oregon State University. He was selected by the St. Louis Hawks in the 6th round (48th pick overall) of the 1962 NBA draft and later played for the Los Angeles Lakers (1968–69) in the NBA for 28 games.
Burroughs defeated San Luis Obispo in the opening round 51-35 before advancing to the semifinals where they beat St. Agnes 65-52. In the finals the Burros had to hold off a strong Bell Gardens team in a squeaker, 41-40.
First-year head coach Jim Nau led the squad to the title, and would be the only year he would coach the locals. Members of the team included: Gary Maxwell, Stuart Young, Larry Fletcher, Joel Adams, Jay Carty, Bill Wilde, Ron Thimsen, John Dragovich, Dennis Henden, Doug Brewer, Gary Koehler, Ray Wilson, Rad Bushnell and Phil Donnell.

1982 Boys' Basketball Championship

Under head Coach Larry Bird, the Burros (24-6, 10-0) claimed their fourth consecutive Golden League Championship as they headed into the playoffs. The league streak would eventually extend to 11 ('78/'79 to '88/'89), ranking third all-time in the CIF Southern Section. Burroughs entered the post season ranked a school best #4 in the polls and defeated Victor Valley, San Bernardino, and Righetti to reach the semifinals at the Long Beach Sports Arena. The Burros matched up with #1 ranked La Serna in the semifinals and advanced with a 66-55 victory. The Burros then faced Capistrano Valley in the finals and won 66-55. An estimated 5,000 people made the more than 3-hour trek to witness the game.

Burroughs advanced to the first-ever state championship tournament, earning a win over Washington Union before finally falling to Banning in the semifinals. Members of the team included: Dalton Heyward, Daniel Means, David Wooten, Scott Fulton, Dale Killilea, Paul Vander Werf, Bobby Bruce, John Fry, Greg Peake, Paul LaMarca, Jim Cleveland, Jim White and Tim Allen. The coaching staff consisted of Head Coach Larry Bird and Assistants Bill Campbell, Frank Mazer and Jack Clark.

1994 Boys' Swimming Championship

After years of dominating the waters of the Golden and Mojave River Leagues, Burroughs claimed its first CIF-SS Title in boys' Swimming. The Burros amassed 174 points in the meet, outscoring second place Laguna Hills by 36 points. The team consisted of well-rounded cast of athletes, but was led by freshman phenomenon David Chan who was named Swimmer of the Meet. As with its to subsequent titles, the team's dominance in the water was highlighted by its absence out of it. The competition had both swimming and diving components, and the Burros had no one competing in the latter. Long-time head coach Charlie Lattig was at the helm for all three titles.
Members of the team included David Chan, Andy Lopez, Dale Garland, Mark Garland, Ryan Lopez, Ryan Webb and Haydn Wilson.

1995 Boys' Swimming Championship

Burroughs continued its dominance of the CIF pool in 1995, claiming its second consecutive division title in Long Beach by edging Jurupa Valley 186-185. This time out the squad was smaller, but the result was the same as Burroughs did not field a diving squad. David Chan won his second straight Swimmer of the Meet title and was named as an All-American.
Members of the team included David Chan, Dale Garland, Mark Garland and Ryan Lopez.

1996 Boys' Swimming Championship

The Burros effected a 'Three-peat' in winning the title again. And again, Chan was named the Swimmer of the Meet. Ryan Lopez combined with Mark and Dale Garland to round out what is arguably the most competitive foursome ever seen in a CIF pool.
Members of the team included David Chan, Dale Garland, Mark Garland and Ryan Lopez.
As the 1997 season neared, Chan was named to the US Junior National Team and was on track to be part of the 2000 US Olympic squad. But he was diagnosed with an osteosarcoma in his right shoulder joint. Surgery and radiation treatments were required and he was forced to have more than 70% of his muscle tissue removed to extract the cancer. He returned to the team as a swimmer/coach in 1997, swimming with one arm and still defeating the league foes that he faced.

2003 Girls' Swimming Championship

It was well worth the long wait for the members of the 2003 Girls Swim Team. After a season that saw them perform better at a variety meets that they had in years past, the Lady Burros claimed the school's first-ever CIF Championship for women. Burroughs took to the waters of the Long Beach Aquatics Center on May 16–17 to compete in the CIF Finals. While they were able to post a handful of first-place finishes in the pre-lims, Burroughs failed to win an event in the finals. But their overall strength in the individual and relay events earned them a nine-point margin of victory over Yucaipa High School. The Lady Burros finished with 252 points, while Yucaipa had 243. Rounding out the top competitors were La Serna High School at 234 and Murrieta Valley High School at 171. As with the boys championships of '94-'96, Burroughs did not field any divers. The Lady Burros were coached by Greg Janson. Team members included: Jenna Marvin, Cindy Bithel, Lani Seaman, Kari Seaman, Amy Speer, Lisa Speer, Jennifer Schwalb, Jessica Schwalb, Kym Bauer, Stacy Davis, Moriah Baker, Danielle Herteg and Monika Lee.

2005 Boys' Football Championship

Burroughs brought home the first CIF football championship in the school's history under the direction of Head Coach Jeff Steinberg, who was coaching in his final season at the high school. The Burros wrapped up the season with an 11-3 overall record, with two of their three losses coming to fellow section champions Canyon and St. Bonaventure. Burroughs defeated Colony and Sultana in the first two rounds of the playoffs at home, then traveled to Palm Desert to defeat the then-unbeaten Aztecs, and clinched the title with a 42-30 win over the Palm Springs High School Indians on Dec. 10, 2005.
Notable players on the championship squad included seniors QB David LaFromboise, WR Hayo Carpenter, RB Anthony Williams, and defensive standouts Ron Marker and Shawn Parker.
Following their victory, the Burros were honored with a parade down Balsam Street in Ridgecrest, and a victory rally.

Boys Basketball Consecutive League Championship Record

From 1978 to 1989 the Burros won or shared the Golden league title in Boys Basketball for 11 consecutive years. At the end of its run in 1989, the accomplishment placed them third on the CIF-SS All-Time list behind Banning (17 titles, '77-'93), Bishop (12 titles, '72-'83) and tied with Pasadena (11 titles, '71-'81). Burroughs and Pasadena are currently tied for 7th on the list. Larry Bird was the head coach for the first seven years of the run, while Frank Mazer was at the helm for the final four. Mazer had been a JV and freshman coach during Bird's tenure at Burroughs. Pg. 34.

Boys' Football Finals Appearances

In addition to their championship in 2005, the Burros made the CIF finals in football in 1974 (losing to Neff High School under the direction of Head Coach Bruce Bernhardi), in 2003 (losing to Kaiser High School 44-34 under the direction of Steinberg), and in 2017 (losing to Aquinas High School under the direction of head coach Todd Mather).

Cross Country & Track

Burroughs High School has also fielded excellent cross country and track teams over the years. During the mid to late 1980s, both men's and women's teams regularly captured Golden League titles, the men's team went undefeated in Golden League dual meets from 1987–1988. In 1988 the men's team won the Quartz Hill Relays which also featured a meet record from the men's 4 × 800 relay team (Anthony Asborno, Bobby Moldenhauer, Brian Lindsey, Jack Osborne). Osborne was also a winner of the 1987 Arcadia Invitational 2 Mile in a school record 9:20.

== Notable alumni ==
- Ted Bachman, football player
- 1958 Jay Carty, Center, St. Louis Hawks & Los Angeles Lakers
- 1990 Mark Hoppus, Grammy-nominated bassist and co-lead vocalist of the rock band Blink-182
- 1994 Joesph Tuipala, football player, Jacksonville Jaguars
- 1995 Jerome Davis, Four-year 400m dash Pacific-10 Conference champion & 1998 NCAA 400m champion at USC
- 1999 Sabaa Tahir, New York Times best selling author.
