= Sherman E. Burroughs (United States Navy) =

Sherman E. Burroughs, Jr.
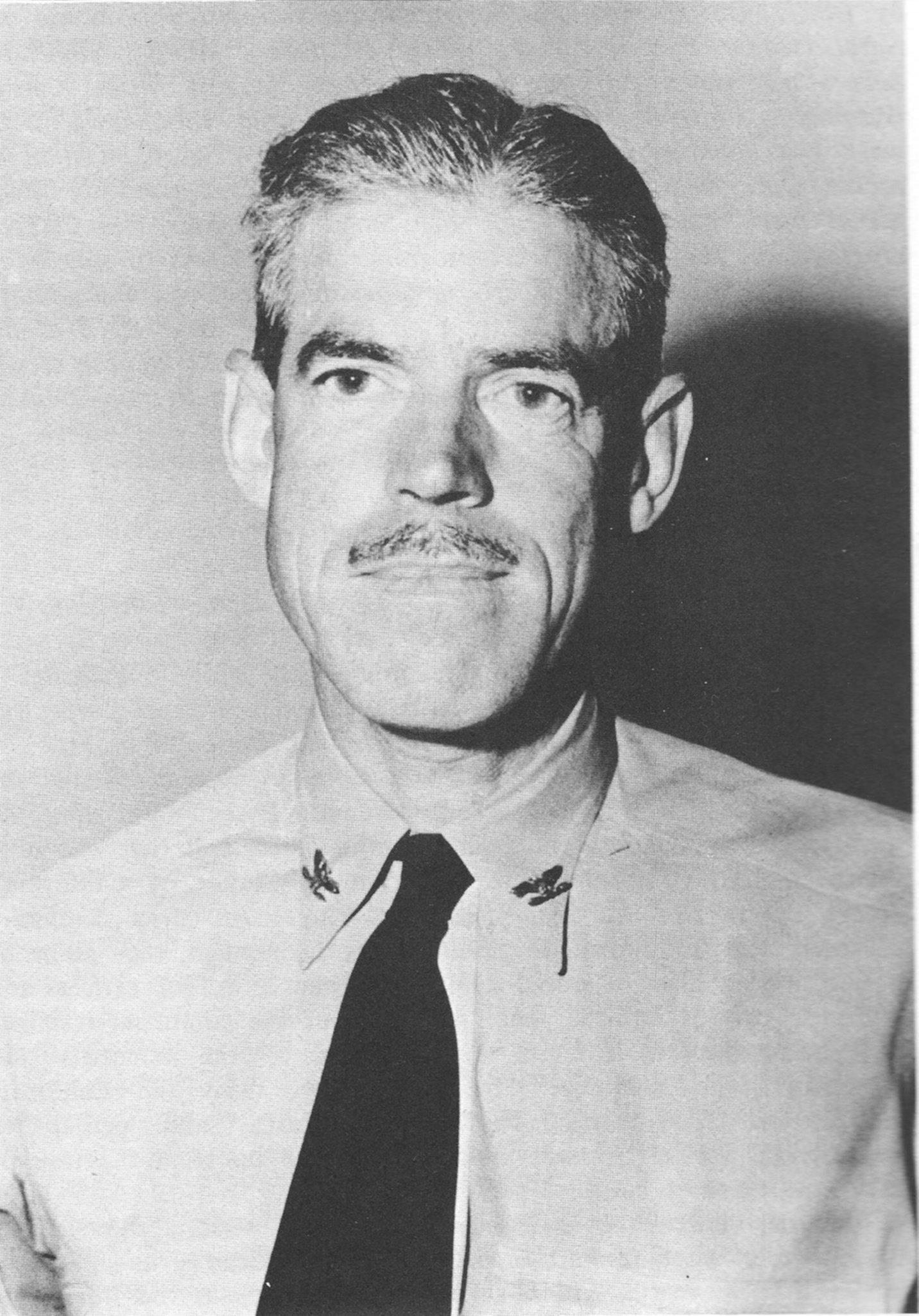
- Captain Sherman E. Burroughs, Jr.
- Born: 22 February 1903; Manchester, New Hampshire, US
- Died: 23 September 1992 (aged 89); Coronado, California, US
- Military career
- Allegiance: United States
- Branch: United States Navy
- Service years: 1924–1954
- Rank: Rear Admiral
- Service number: 0-58599
- Commands: Naval Air Station Quonset Point; USS Cape Gloucester; Naval Ordnance Test Station; Carrier Air Wing Three
- Conflicts: World War II: Battle of Midway; Guadalcanal campaign; Bougainville campaign
- Awards: Silver Star (2); Legion of Merit; Distinguished Flying Cross

Rear Admiral Sherman E. Burroughs, Jr. (February 22, 1903 – September 23, 1992) was a senior officer in the United States Navy, and the first commander of the Naval Air Weapons Station China Lake originally known as the Naval Ordnance Test Station (NOTS).

== Early life ==
Sherman Everett Burroughs, Jr., was born in Manchester, New Hampshire, on February 22, 1903, the son of Sherman Everett Burroughs, Sr., lawyer who served as member of the New Hampshire House of Representatives and later United States Congressman, and his wife Helen Sophie née Phillips.

Burroughs graduated from the United States Naval Academy at Annapolis with the class of 1924, and became a naval aviator in 1926. He served on the aircraft carriers USS Langley and USS Saratoga from 1927 to 1929, and was senior aviator on the light cruiser USS Memphis between 1933 and 1935, and on the ill-fated battleship USS Arizona from 1938 to 1939.

== World War II ==
=== Pacific Theater ===
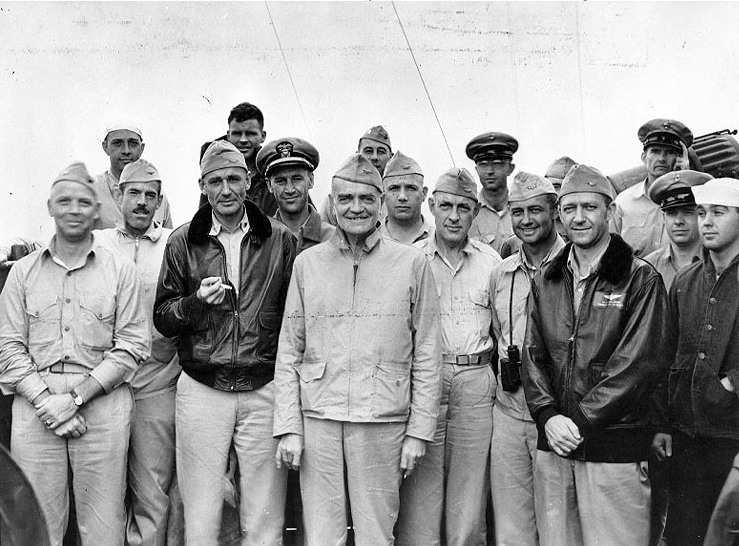
Vice Admiral William F. Halsey, Jr., with his staff. Burroughs is third from the left.

At the time of the Japanese attack on Pearl Harbor, which brought the United States into the Pacific War, Burroughs was serving on the staff of Vice Admiral William F. Halsey, Jr., flying his flag on the USS Enterprise As such, Burroughs participated in the Marshalls-Gilberts raids in February 1942, the raids on Wake Island and Marcus Islands the following month, and the Battle of Midway in June 1942. For his services, he was awarded the Silver Star. He subsequently was awarded a second Silver Star for his services on the staff of Rear Admiral Thomas C. Kinkaid's Task Force 16 at the Battle of the Eastern Solomons in August 1942.

Burroughs became commander of Carrier Air Group Three, flying from the carrier USS Saratoga. He was awarded the Distinguished Flying Cross. His citation read:

for heroism and extraordinary achievement as Air Group Commander of SARATOGA Air Group THREE while participating in aerial attacks upon enemy Japanese shore installations and shipping in the Solomon Islands area from 19 February to 8 March 1943. Personally leading six coordinated attacks upon Munda Point, Kahili, Buin Harbor and Ballale Island, Commander Burroughs, by his excellent judgment and cool courage in the face of heavy enemy anti-aircraft fire, contributed greatly to the destruction of numerous anti-aircraft batteries, ammunition and supply dumps and one large cargo transport. During the action against Kahili he further proved his brilliant leadership when, with complete disregard for his own safety, he intentionally exposed himself to hostile anti-aircraft fire while indicating to the pilots who followed him the location and identity of the target area. Despite hazardous opposition from enemy guns and fighter aircraft, Commander Burroughs gallantly led his air group to successful completion of each mission.

=== Naval Ordnance Test Station ===
Following the usual pattern of alternating sea duty with service ashore, Burroughs's next assignment was the aviation desk at the Bureau of Ordnance in Washington, D.C., in March 1943. Halsey was supportive of this, telling him to "Go back and get things straightened out back there! Try to get those guys off the dime!" He proposed that a special Naval Ordnance Test Station (NOTS) be established specifically devoted to the development of aircraft weapons, which he had long felt had been neglected by the navy in favor of shipboard weapons, and he nominated himself, as a naval aviator with postgraduate ordnance education, to command it. NOTS was authorised by the Secretary of the Navy, Frank Knox, and in December 1943, Burroughs assumed command of the new station in the Mojave Desert.

Burroughs served as commander of the NOTS from December 20, 1943, to August 18, 1945. NOTS assumed responsibility for the development efforts already under way in rockets. Under his command, NOTS worked with the California Institute of Technology (Caltech) on the successful development and testing of the 3.5-inch, 5-inch, HVAR and 11.75-inch (Tiny Tim) rockets. It also supplied support for the Manhattan Project through Project Camel. Nearby Sherman E. Burroughs High School, which opened on September 10, 1945, a month after he left NOTS, was named after him. For his services in command of NOTS, Burroughs was awarded the Legion of Merit. His citation read:

Captain Burroughs distinguished himself by exceptionally meritorious conduct in the performance of outstanding service in connection with the development and testing of rocket ammunition. Largely through his efforts, new types of rocket ammunition have been adopted for use by small vessels, invasion craft, and aircraft, and have greatly increased the effectiveness of these craft, thereby directly increasing the firepower of the Fleet. His initiative, technical ability, and aggressive spirit were instrumental in evolving and executing a carefully planned development and test program for rocket ammunition. By virtue of his previous combat experience and keen powers of analysis, he was able to select and propose for adoption rocket ammunition which was outstandingly successful in combat operations.

In 1957 he received the L.T.E. Thompson award for:

his application of the concept of a government laboratory for ordnance research and development work. His inspirational leadership, dedication to and enthusiasm for his work established an atmosphere for a successful civilian-military team approach and laid the groundwork for developing a facility of great importance to the navy, the Department of Defense, and the nation.

== Later life ==
Following his tour of command at NOTS, Burroughs commanded the aircraft carrier USS Cape Gloucester. He again served at the Bureau of Ordnance in Washington, and at the Naval War College for two years. His final command was of the Naval Air Station Quonset Point, after which he retired in 1954, with tombstone promotion to the rank of rear admiral.

He then became an executive with the General Precision Equipment Corporation in New York City and Washington, D.C., from which he retired in 1967. He moved to Coronado, California. He was a volunteer at the Small Business Administration in San Diego, and a weekly visitor to senior citizens at the Coronado Hospital's long-term care facility.

Following a series of strokes, he died at the Villa Coronado Care Center in Coronado, on September 23, 1992. His body was cremated and his ashes were scattered at sea.

Sherman E. Burroughs High school in Ridgecrest, Ca was named after the Rear Admiral.
