= Indian Wells Valley =

Valley in California, United States

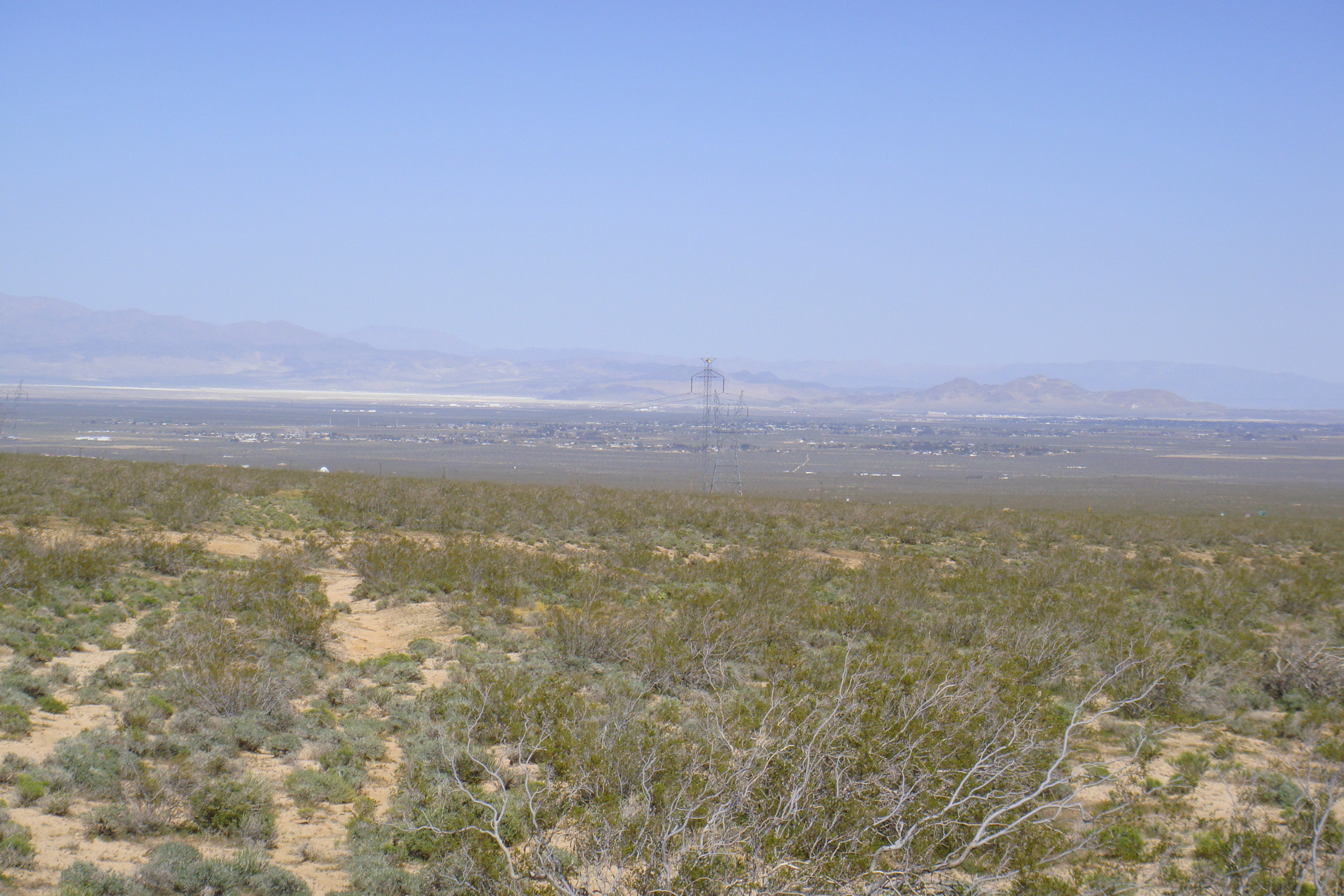
- Indian Wells Valley, showing Ridgecrest, California and the China Lake area.
- Length: 33 m (108 ft) N-S

Geography
- Borders on: Argus Range (E); Coso Range (N); El Paso Mountains (S); Sierra Nevada (W)
- Coordinates: 35°42′10″N 117°41′11″W
- Interactive map of Indian Wells Valley

Indian Wells Valley is an arid north–south basin in east-central California. In the geologic sense, it is a southern extension of Owens Valley to the north, with the recent volcanics of the Coso Range being the separator. It is defined by a major fault on the west side of the valley. Unlike Owens Valley, it is bound by a fault to the south, the Garlock Fault (within the El Paso Mountains). The valley is part of California's South Lahontan hydrologic region.

Owens Peak, located west of the Indian Wells Valley, overlooks the basin from the west at 8,452 feet, making it the tallest peak in the southern Sierra Nevada range. Other mountain ranges surrounding the valley include the Argus Range in the east, the Coso Range in the north, and the El Paso Mountains in the south.

== Geography ==
The Indian Wells Valley is shared by three separate counties; Inyo County encompassing the north, Kern County making up the south-central and western part of the valley, and San Bernardino County making up the remaining eastern segment. It lies within the 760 and 442 area code zone.

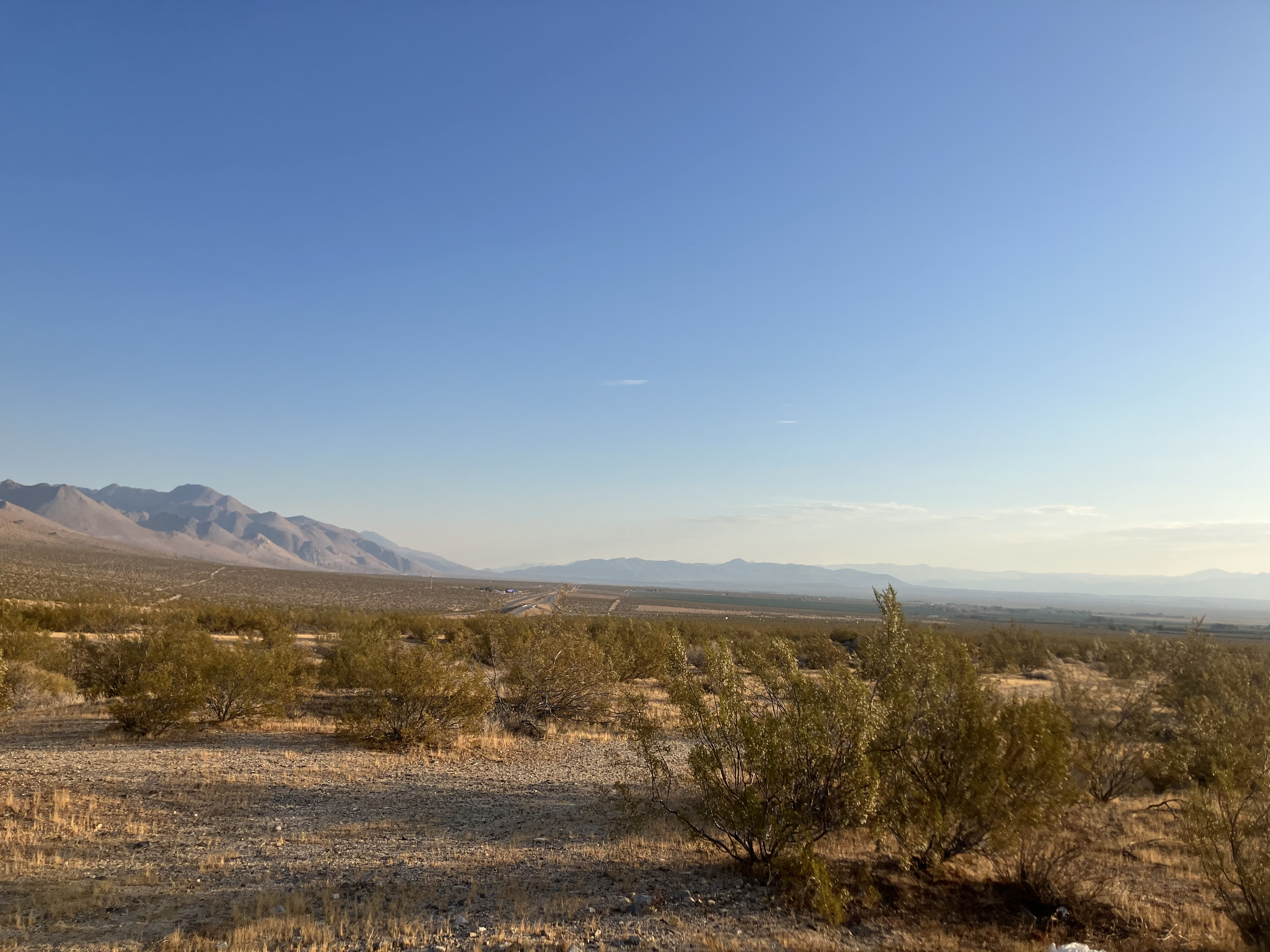
Indian Wells Valley, facing north toward the Coso Range

Indian Wells Valley is traversed by California State Route 14, California State Route 178, and US Highway 395. The valley varies in elevation from as low as 2,150 feet to as high as 2,400 feet. China Lake, a perennial lake and namesake for the Naval Air Weapons Station China Lake and unincorporated community China Lake, is located in the northeastern segment of the valley.

=== Settlements ===
The valley's largest and only incorporated community is Ridgecrest. Other unincorporated communities include Inyokern, Pearsonville, China Lake Acres, China Lake, Ridgecrest Heights, and Indian Wells. Indian Wells Valley contains the second largest population base in Kern County with a population of 34,837 (per 2010 census).

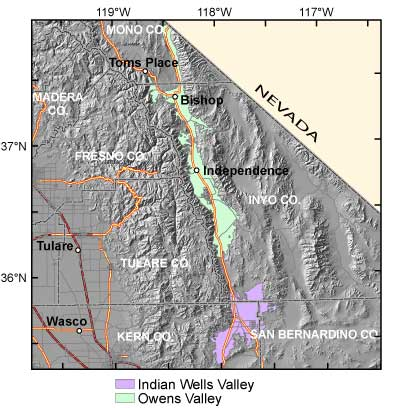
USGS diagram showing the groundwater basins of Owens and Indian Wells Valleys

== Ecology ==
Indian Wells Valley is located in the northwesternmost part of the Mojave Desert plant community and ecoregion, receiving just 4-6 inches of precipitation a year.

== See also ==
- Tehachapi Wind Resource Area
