= Ridgecrest, California =

City in California, United States

- City
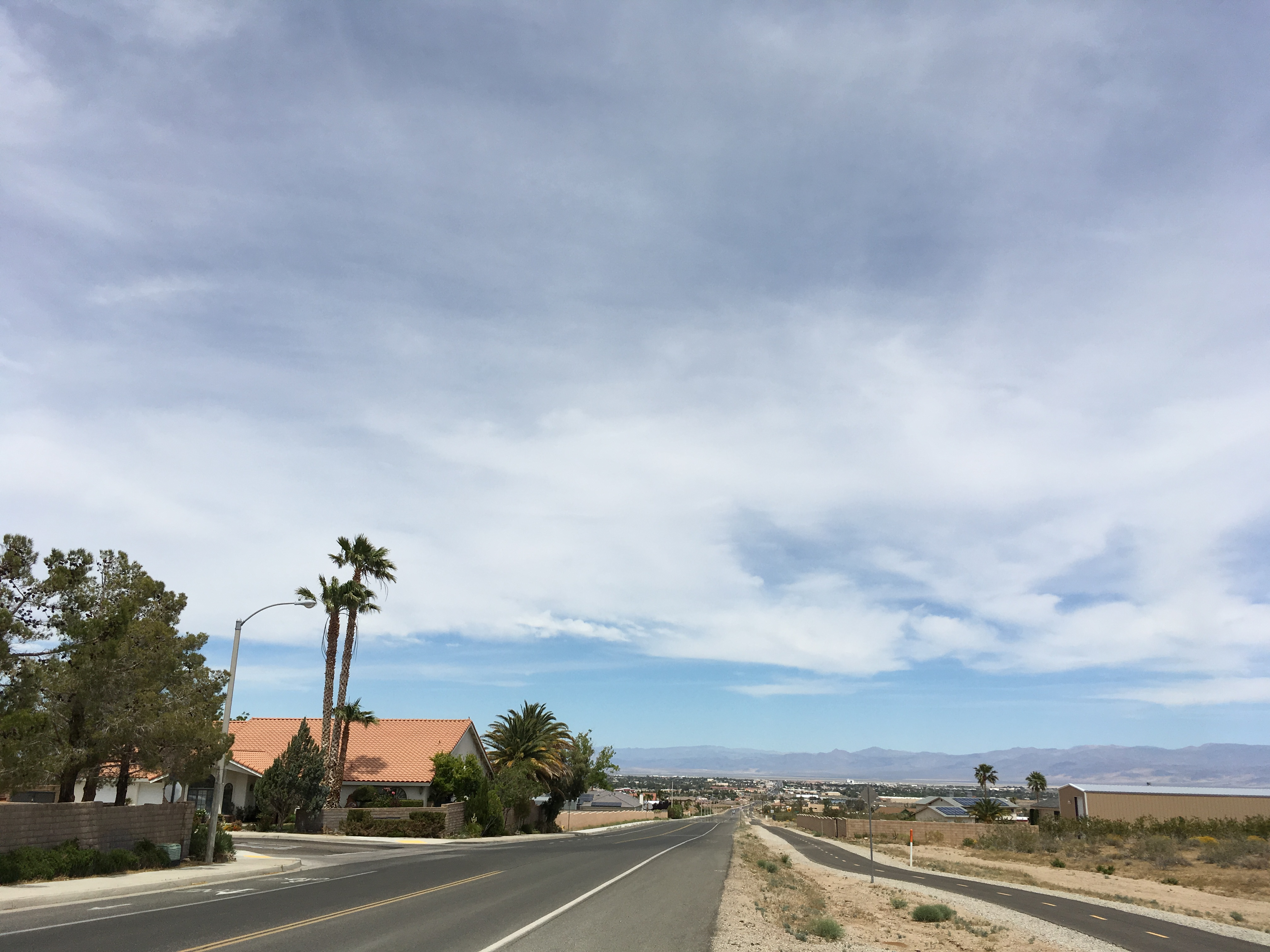
- College Heights Blvd., Ridgecrest

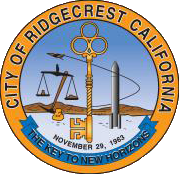
- Seal
- Interactive map of Ridgecrest, California
- Location in the United States Ridgecrest (California) Ridgecrest (the United States)
- Coordinates: 35°37′21″N 117°40′15″W
- Country: United States
- State: California
- County: Kern
- Incorporated: November 29, 1963

Government
  - Mayor: Travis W. Endicott
  - State senator: Shannon Grove (R)
  - Assemblymember: Stan Ellis (R)
  - U. S. rep.: Vince Fong (R)

Area
  - Total: 21.51 sq mi (55.70 km^{2})
  - Land: 20.86 sq mi (54.03 km^{2})
  - Water: 0.64 sq mi (1.67 km^{2}) 3.00%
- Elevation: 2,290 ft (698 m)

Population (April 1, 2020)
  - Total: 27,959
  - Density: 1,340/sq mi (517.5/km^{2})
- Time zone: UTC−08:00 (Pacific)
  - Summer (DST): UTC−07:00 (PDT)
- ZIP Codes: 93555–93556
- Area codes: 442 and 760
- FIPS code: 06-60704
- GNIS feature IDs: 1652783, 2410944
- Website: www.ridgecrest-ca.gov

Ridgecrest is a city in Kern County, California, United States, along U.S. Route 395 in the Indian Wells Valley in northeastern Kern County, adjacent to the Naval Air Weapons Station China Lake (NAWS, or China Lake). It was incorporated as a city in 1963. The population was 27,959 at the 2020 census, up slightly from 27,616 at the 2010 census, making it the third-largest city in Kern County.

Ridgecrest is surrounded by four mountain ranges; the Sierra Nevada on the west, the Coso Range on the north, the Argus Range on the east, and the El Paso Mountains on the south. The most isolated community in Kern county, it is approximately 82 miles (132 km) from the Lancaster/Palmdale area, 110 miles (177 km) from Bakersfield, and 120 miles (193 km) from San Bernardino, the three nearest major urban centers. Private air travel in and out of the city is provided through the Inyokern Airport. There are currently no scheduled commercial flights.

The city has been near the epicenter of major earthquakes, including one in 1995 and a series of quakes in July 2019.

== History ==
Native American tribes of the Paiute, Shoshone, and Kawaiisu thrived in the Indian Wells Valley. The Shoshone tribe left behind petroglyphs in the Coso Range that can be found in Big and Little Petroglyph Canyons. Their petroglyphs and artwork are displayed in the Maturango Museum and Petroglyph Park.

During the mid-1800s, travelers began crossing through the Indian Wells Valley. In 1826, Jedediah Smith's beaver trappers arrived, followed in 1834 by Joseph Walker when he crossed Walker Pass into the Indian Wells Valley. Throughout the rest of the nineteenth century, mining booms brought more settlers to the valley. In the 1880s, Chinese railroad workers briefly settled in the area, giving local China Lake its name.

Until the twentieth century, non-permanent settlers had arrived and traveled throughout the Indian Wells Valley. This changed, however, when the Los Angeles Aqueduct was built and finished from 1908–1913. This, plus the arrival of the Southern Pacific Railroad brought lasting settlers to the Indian Wells Valley.

The settlement that eventually became Ridgecrest began as a farming community called Crumville in 1912, honoring James and Robert Crum, local dairymen. The first post office opened in 1941. By 1943, Ridgecrest had grown to 115 homes and 196 residents. The Naval Ordnance Test Station (NOTS) was established in November 1943, providing a strong job base for the years to come.

Ridgecrest incorporated in 1963. During this era the growth of Ridgecrest was governed by the continuing needs of the high tech industries coupled to the Naval Air Weapons Station (NAWS) programs for testing arms and guidance systems. Today, the city serves as an essential housing and business community for NAWS China Lake.

== Geography ==
According to the United States Census Bureau, the city has a total area of 21.5 square miles (55.7 km^{2}), of which 20.9 mi^{2} (54.1 km^{2}) is land and 0.6 mi^{2} (1.6 km^{2}) of it (3.00%) is water. Ridgecrest is located in Indian Wells Valley, which is a southern extension of Owens Valley, broken up by the volcanic Coso Range.

=== 1995 earthquake ===
The area, associated with the Eastern California Shear Zone, has in the past experienced numerous earthquake swarms, groups of several thousand quakes under magnitude 6.0 or so, often with no obvious mainshock. The 1995 Ridgecrest earthquake sequence started on August 17, when a magnitude 5.4 quake, centered 18 kilometers (11 mi) north of the town of Ridgecrest, shook the area and spawned over 2,500 aftershocks over the course of the following five weeks. Then, on September 20, 1995, the second large quake struck the area: it measured magnitude 5.8, and was at that time the largest earthquake to hit southern California since the 1994 Northridge earthquake.

=== 2019 earthquakes ===
Between July 4 and 5, 2019, the city of Ridgecrest and surrounding communities experienced a series of significant earthquakes, including the strongest to impact the area in decades—a magnitude 7.1 mainshock. The epicenter of the main earthquake was located approximately 10 miles northeast of Ridgecrest.

The sequence began on July 4 with a 4.0-magnitude quake approximately 11 kilometers (6.8 mi) southwest of Searles Valley. Later that morning, at 10:33 A.M., a 6.4-magnitude earthquake struck around 12 kilometers (7.5 mi) southwest of Searles Valley. This initial sequence triggered over 1,400 aftershocks in the Ridgecrest and Searles Valley regions.

On July 5, 2019, at 8:19 P.M., the magnitude 7.1 mainshock, known as the Ridgecrest mainshock occurred, significantly impacting the Ridgecrest area.

=== Climate ===
The weather in the Indian Wells Valley is predominantly influenced by its high desert location. The climate is characterized by hot days and cool nights with extremely arid conditions prevailing throughout the summer months. The mean annual maximum temperature for the Ridgecrest area is 75 °F (24 °C) while the mean annual minimum temperature is 48 °F (9 °C). There are wide annual temperature fluctuations that occur from a high of 119 °F (48 °C) to a low of 1 °F (−17 °C). On average, annual rainfall is less than 5 inches (130 mm) "equivalent rainfall" per year, which includes less than 2 inches (51 mm) of snow. The area is known to have wind as high as 75 mph (121 km/h). December is the coolest month with an average maximum temperature of 60 °F (16 °C) and an average minimum temperature of 30 °F (−1 °C). The all-time minimum temperature of 1 °F (−17 °C) was recorded on December 23, 1963, and January 7, 1973.

July is the hottest month with an average maximum temperature of 103 °F (39 °C) and an average minimum temperature of 66 °F (19 °C). The all-time maximum temperature of 119 °F (48 °C) was recorded on July 11, 2021, tied with July 1988 and July 1993.

Climate data for China Lake NAF, California (1991–2020 normals, extremes 1945–present)
Month	Jan	Feb	Mar	Apr	May	Jun	Jul	Aug	Sep	Oct	Nov	Dec	Year
Record high °F (°C)	89 (32)	91 (33)	96 (36)	104 (40)	109 (43)	118 (48)	119 (48)	119 (48)	114 (46)	106 (41)	93 (34)	81 (27)	119 (48)
Mean daily maximum °F (°C)	60.1 (15.6)	64.6 (18.1)	71.9 (22.2)	78.7 (25.9)	88.2 (31.2)	98.5 (36.9)	104.6 (40.3)	103.3 (39.6)	95.2 (35.1)	82.7 (28.2)	69.4 (20.8)	59.5 (15.3)	81.4 (27.4)
Daily mean °F (°C)	45.5 (7.5)	50.0 (10.0)	56.9 (13.8)	63.1 (17.3)	71.8 (22.1)	81.1 (27.3)	87.5 (30.8)	85.9 (29.9)	77.8 (25.4)	65.6 (18.7)	53.1 (11.7)	44.9 (7.2)	65.3 (18.5)
Mean daily minimum °F (°C)	30.8 (−0.7)	35.4 (1.9)	41.8 (5.4)	47.4 (8.6)	55.5 (13.1)	63.7 (17.6)	70.4 (21.3)	68.6 (20.3)	60.5 (15.8)	48.5 (9.2)	36.8 (2.7)	30.3 (−0.9)	49.1 (9.5)
Record low °F (°C)	6 (−14)	12 (−11)	21 (−6)	27 (−3)	35 (2)	42 (6)	50 (10)	51 (11)	39 (4)	20 (−7)	16 (−9)	8 (−13)	6 (−14)
Average precipitation inches (mm)	0.94 (24)	1.11 (28)	0.55 (14)	0.24 (6.1)	0.10 (2.5)	0.07 (1.8)	0.12 (3.0)	0.11 (2.8)	0.24 (6.1)	0.27 (6.9)	0.38 (9.7)	0.54 (14)	4.67 (119)
Source 1: NOAA
Source 2: xmACIS2

== Demographics ==
Historical population
Census	Pop.	Note	%±
1950	2,028		—
1960	5,099		151.4%
1970	7,629		49.6%
1980	15,929		108.8%
1990	27,725		74.1%
2000	24,927		−10.1%
2010	27,616		10.8%
2020	27,959		1.2%
U.S. Decennial Census

=== Racial and ethnic composition ===
Ridgecrest city, California – Racial and ethnic composition Note: the US Census treats Hispanic/Latino as an ethnic category. This table excludes Latinos from the racial categories and assigns them to a separate category. Hispanics/Latinos may be of any race.
Race / Ethnicity (NH = Non-Hispanic)	Pop 2000	Pop 2010	Pop 2020	% 2000	% 2010	% 2020
White alone (NH)	19,067	19,019	16,763	76.49%	68.87%	59.96%
Black or African American alone (NH)	846	1,041	1,222	3.39%	3.77%	4.37%
Native American or Alaska Native alone (NH)	204	245	157	0.82%	0.89%	0.56%
Asian alone (NH)	948	1,188	1,457	3.80%	4.30%	5.21%
Native Hawaiian or Pacific Islander alone (NH)	127	127	161	0.51%	0.46%	0.58%
Other race alone (NH)	34	43	155	0.14%	0.16%	0.55%
Mixed race or Multiracial (NH)	700	1,012	1,920	2.81%	3.66%	6.87%
Hispanic or Latino (any race)	3,001	4,941	6,124	12.04%	17.89%	21.90%
Total	24,927	27,616	27,959	100.00%	100.00%	100.00%

=== 2020 census ===
As of the 2020 census, Ridgecrest had a population of 27,959. The population density was 1,340.3 inhabitants per square mile (517.5/km^{2}). The median age was 34.7 years. The age distribution was 25.6% under the age of 18, 8.2% aged 18 to 24, 29.7% aged 25 to 44, 22.3% aged 45 to 64, and 14.2% who were 65 years of age or older. For every 100 females there were 100.9 males, and for every 100 females age 18 and over there were 100.2 males age 18 and over.

The census reported that 99.0% of the population lived in households, 0.8% lived in non-institutionalized group quarters, and 0.2% were institutionalized. In addition, 98.0% of residents lived in urban areas, while 2.0% lived in rural areas.

There were 11,186 households, out of which 32.7% had children under the age of 18. Of all households, 43.7% were married-couple households, 8.2% were cohabiting couple households, 24.7% had a female householder with no spouse or partner present, and 23.4% had a male householder with no spouse or partner present. 29.8% of households were one person, and 10.1% were one person aged 65 or older. The average household size was 2.47. There were 7,010 families (62.7% of all households).

There were 12,359 housing units at an average density of 592.4 units per square mile (228.7 units/km^{2}), of which 11,186 (90.5%) were occupied. Of these, 61.3% were owner-occupied and 38.7% were occupied by renters. The homeowner vacancy rate was 2.7%, and the rental vacancy rate was 9.5%.

=== 2023 estimate ===
In 2023, the US Census Bureau estimated that the median household income was $88,107, and the per capita income was $40,173. About 7.7% of families and 11.7% of the population were below the poverty line.

=== 2010 census ===
The 2010 United States census reported that Ridgecrest had a population of 27,616. The population density was 1,289.5 inhabitants per square mile (497.9/km^{2}). The racial makeup of Ridgecrest was 21,387 (77.4%) White, 1,113 (4.0%) African American, 341 (1.2%) Native American, 1,209 (4.4%) Asian, 143 (0.5%) Pacific Islander, 1,836 (6.6%) from other races, and 1,587 (5.7%) from two or more races. Hispanic or Latino of any race were 4,941 persons (17.9%).

The Census reported that 27,420 people (99.3% of the population) lived in households, 109 (0.4%) lived in non-institutionalized group quarters, and 87 (0.3%) were institutionalized.

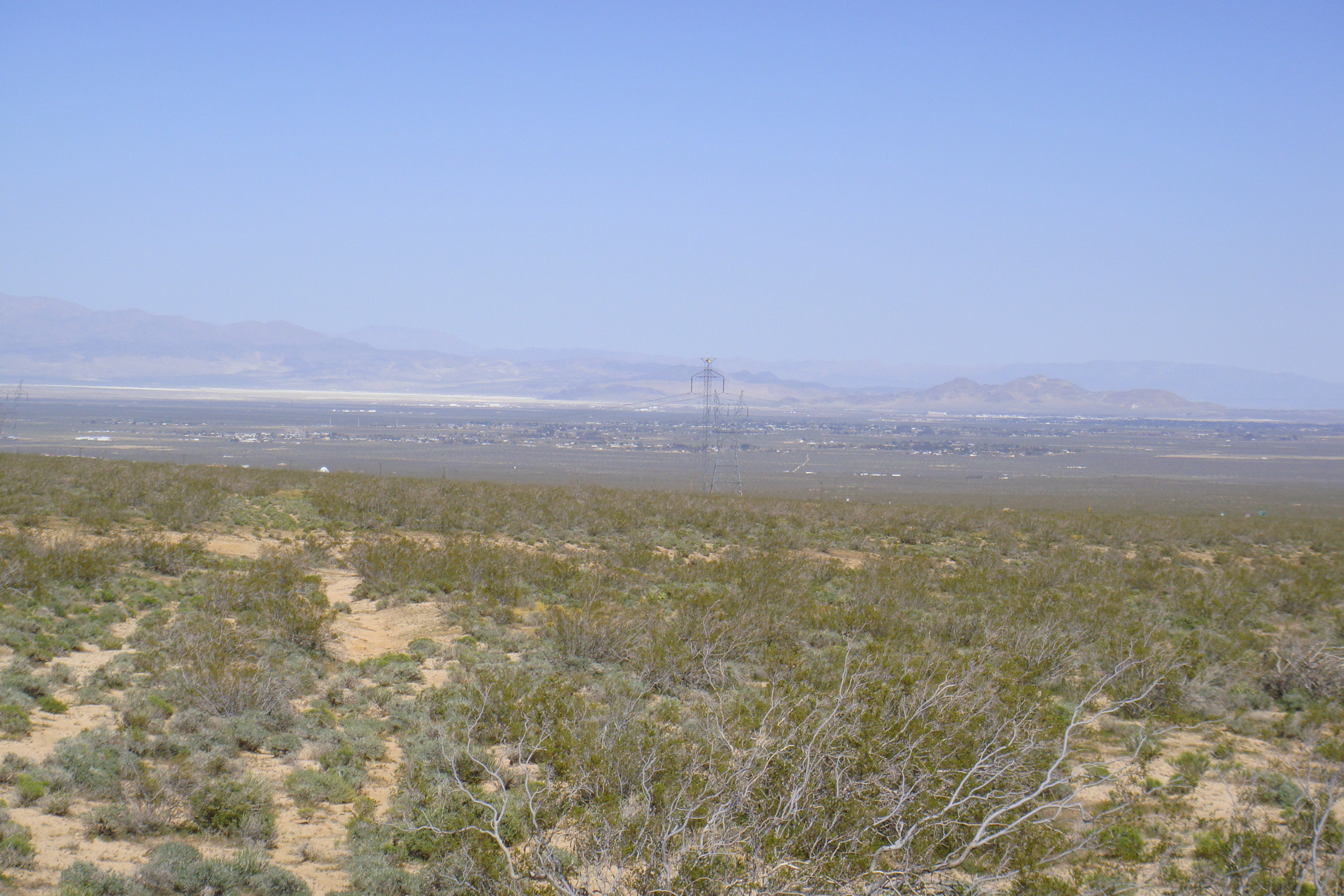
Overview shot of Ridgecrest, from the west on CA-178

There were 10,781 households, out of which 3,901 (36.2%) had children under the age of 18 living in them, 5,211 (48.3%) were opposite-sex married couples living together, 1,352 (12.5%) had a female householder with no husband present, 609 (5.6%) had a male householder with no wife present. There were 681 (6.3%) unmarried opposite-sex partnerships, and 64 (0.6%) same-sex married couples or partnerships. 2,978 households (27.6%) were made up of individuals, and 1,001 (9.3%) had someone living alone who was 65 years of age or older. The average household size was 2.54. There were 7,172 families (66.5% of all households); the average family size was 3.10.

The population was spread out, with 7,544 people (27.3%) under the age of 18, 2,654 people (9.6%) aged 18 to 24, 7,157 people (25.9%) aged 25 to 44, 6,844 people (24.8%) aged 45 to 64, and 3,417 people (12.4%) who were 65 years of age or older. The median age was 33.8 years. For every 100 females, there were 100.3 males. For every 100 females age 18 and over, there were 99.9 males.

There were 11,915 housing units at an average density of 556.3 units per square mile (214.8 units/km^{2}), of which 6,525 (60.5%) were owner-occupied, and 4,256 (39.5%) were occupied by renters. The homeowner vacancy rate was 2.9%; the rental vacancy rate was 9.2%. 16,520 people (59.8% of the population) lived in owner-occupied housing units and 10,900 people (39.5%) lived in rental housing units.

=== 2000 census ===
Sunset in Ridgecrest, California

According to the census of 2000, there were 24,927 people, 9,826 households, and 6,691 families residing in the city. The population density was 1,179.9 inhabitants per square mile (455.6/km^{2}). There were 11,309 housing units at an average density of 535.3/sq mi (206.7/km^{2}). The racial makeup of the city was 82.02% White, 3.53% Black or African American, 1.08% Native American, 3.88% Asian, 0.58% Pacific Islander, 4.93% from other races, and 3.98% from two or more races. 12.04% of the population were Hispanic or Latino of any race.

There were 9,826 households, out of which 35.0% had children under the age of 18 living with them, 52.2% were married couples living together, 11.5% had a female householder with no husband present, and 31.9% were non-families. 27.6% of all households were made up of individuals, and 8.6% had someone living alone who was 65 years of age or older. The average household size was 2.51 and the average family size was 3.06.

In the city, the population was spread out, with 29.1% under the age of 18, 8.5% from 18 to 24, 28.1% from 25 to 44, 23.0% from 45 to 64, and 11.3% who were 65 years of age or older. The median age was 36 years. For every 100 females, there were 99.6 males. For every 100 females age 18 and over, there were 97.9 males.

The median income for a household in the city was $44,971, and the median income for a family was $52,725. Males had a median income of $46,993 versus $29,558 for females. The per capita income for the city was $21,312. About 10.2% of families and 12.3% of the population were below the poverty line, including 17.5% of those under age 18 and 5.1% of those age 65 or over.

- Crime index: 40.0% safe city
- High school or higher: 87.4%
- Bachelor's degree or higher: 24.4%
- Graduate or professional degree: 8.5%
- Unemployed: 6.8%
- Mean travel time to work: 14.9 minutes
- Never married: 22.1%
- Now married: 56.7%
- Separated: 2.6%
- Widowed: 6.6%
- Divorced: 12.1%
- Males: 12,924 – (49.9%)
- Females: 12,971 – (50.1%)
- Median resident age: 35.5 years
- California median age: 33.3 years

People in group quarters:

- 987 people in military barracks, etc.
- 87 people in nursing homes
- 33 people in other non-institutional group quarters
- 22 people in state prisons

== Economy ==
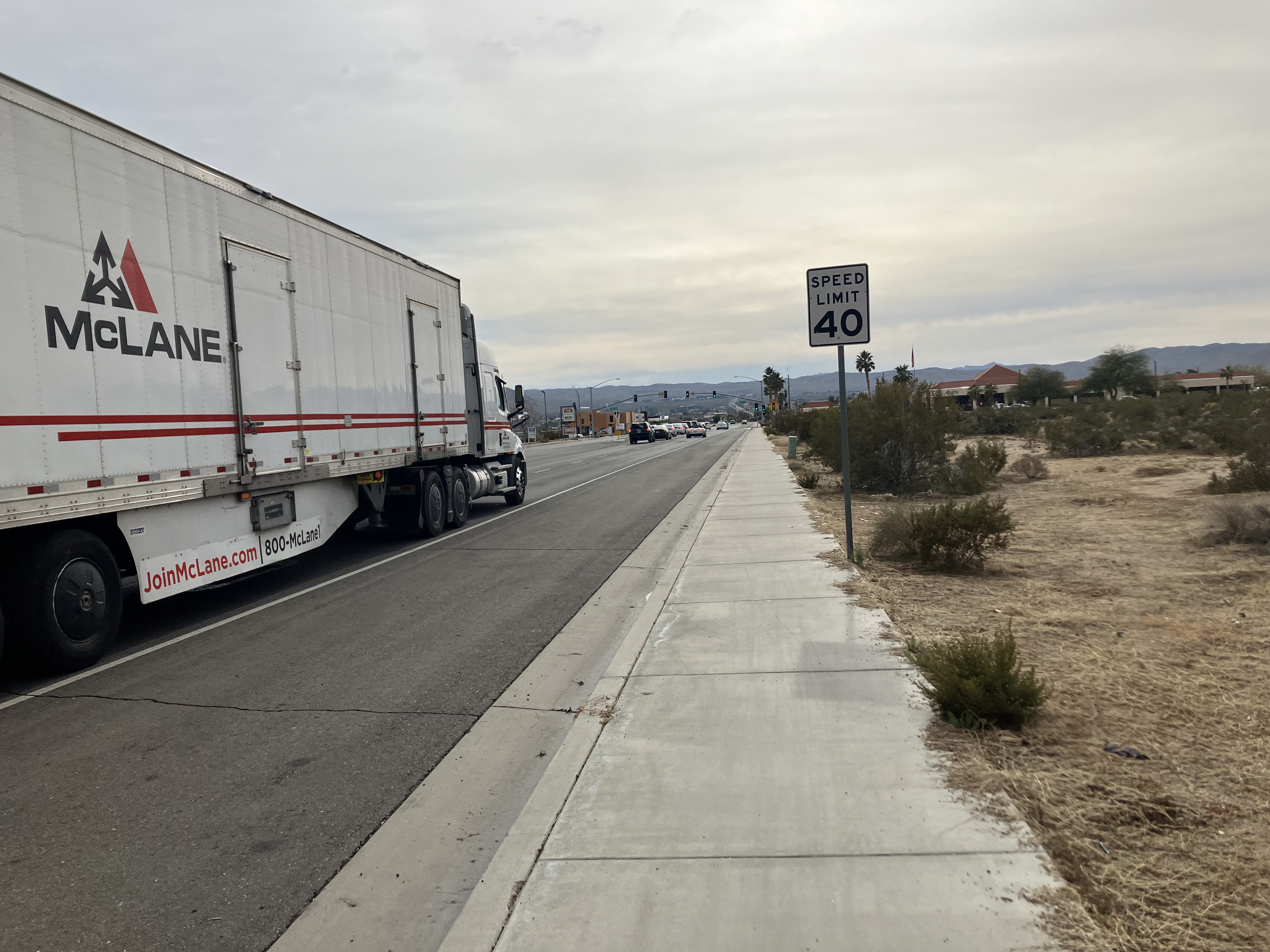
China Lake Blvd

Naval Air Weapons Station China Lake (NAWS China Lake) is an airborne weapons testing and training range located adjacent to Ridgecrest and operated by the United States Navy and its contractors. Naval Air Weapons Station China Lake provides the majority of employment in the city at just under 8,000 jobs in 2018. This includes the government civilian workforce, active duty military personnel and private contractors.

AltaOne Federal Credit Union has its corporate headquarters in Ridgecrest.

The Searles Valley Minerals plant is located adjacent to the Searles Dry Lake near the town of Trona, California, about thirty miles east of Ridgecrest.

=== Top employers ===
According to the city's Annual Comprehensive Financial Report, the principal employers in Ridgecrest in 2024 were:

Rank	Employer	Employees
1	NAWS China Lake	5,922
2	Ridgecrest Regional Hospital	929
3	Sierra Sands Unified School District	688
4	Searles Valley Minerals	575
5	Walmart	280
6	Cerro Coso Community College	178
7	Albertsons	161
8	City of Ridgecrest	135
9	Home Depot	114
10	Alta One Federal Credit Union	99

== Local features and activities ==
Wildflowers in Ridgecrest

The most notable feature in the nearby area is the Coso People rock art in Big and Little Petroglyph Canyons. The Coso People were prolific artists and traded with distant tribes using tools crafted of stone. Archaeological recovery at coastal Chumash sites in California indicates considerable trade with the Coso People.

Other activities in the area are:

- Hunting and shooting
- Hiking
- Horseback riding
- Off-roading and dirt biking
- Golf
- Road cycling
- Camping
- Flying and gliding

=== Maturango Museum ===
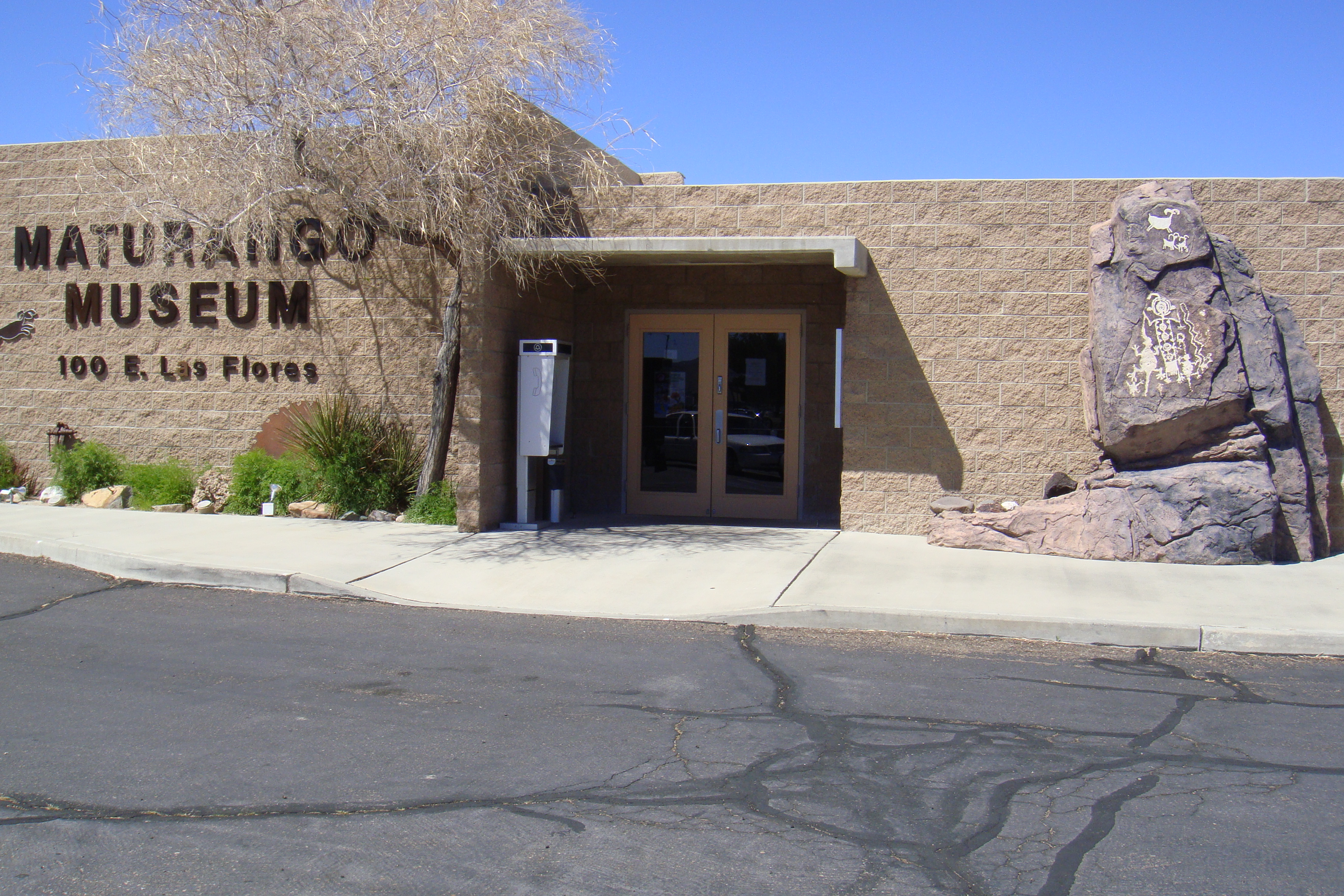
The front of the Maturango Museum

The Maturango Museum is located in Ridgecrest. The museum is best known for the guided tours to Little Petroglyph Canyon on China Lake Naval Weapons Station (NAWS). The museum offers exhibits and displays featuring both the natural and the cultural history and diversity of the Northern Mojave Desert with exhibits of plants, animals, Native American artifacts, geology and contemporary arts and crafts.

=== Coso Rock Art District ===
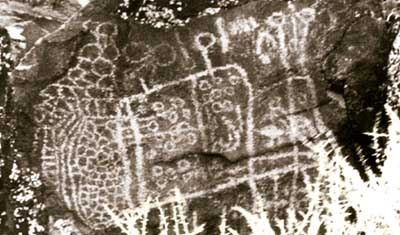
Archaic abstract curvilinear-style petroglyphs near Ridgecrest, CA

Coso Rock Art District, sometimes equated with the Big and Little Petroglyph Canyons is a site containing over 20,000 Native American petroglyphs now located within Naval Air Weapons Station China Lake, near China Lake and Ridgecrest, California. In fact, there are several other distinct canyons to the Coso Rock Art District besides the Big and Little Petroglyph Canyons. The most popular subjects are bighorn sheep, deer, and antelope. Big and Little Petroglyph Canyons were declared a National Historic Landmark in 1964. In 2001, they were incorporated into a larger National Historic Landmark District, called Coso Rock Art District. In 2014, the Ridgecrest Petroglyph Festival, a celebration of the petroglyphs, native culture, and Ridgecrest as a California tourist destination was created as an annual event. It was named as one of Groupon's "10 Most Unique Autumn Festivals in the Country"

=== Walker Pass ===
Walker Pass (elevation 5,250 ft (1.60 km)) is a mountain pass by Lake Isabella in the southern Sierra Nevada mountains. It is located in northeastern Kern County, approximately 53 mi (85 km) ENE of Bakersfield and 10 mi (16 km) WSW of Ridgecrest. The pass provides a route between the San Joaquin Valley on the west and the Mojave Desert on the east.

=== Trona Pinnacles ===
Trona Pinnacles featured in many notable films are located near Ridgecrest.

=== Red Rock Canyon State Park ===
Red Rock Canyon State Park is also very close to Ridgecrest and provides the community with hiking and camping opportunities.

== Education ==
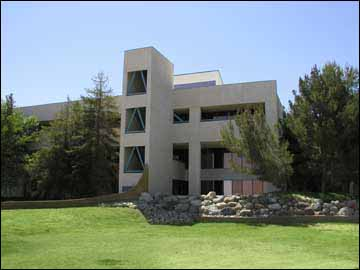
Cerro Coso Community College

Sierra Sands Unified School District, which serves the city of Ridgecrest, Inyokern, and the surrounding communities, includes the following elementary schools: Las Flores Elementary, Faller Elementary, Richmond Elementary currently displaced to Vieweg Elementary due to damage in recent earthquakes, Gateway Elementary, Pierce Elementary, and Inyokern Elementary. For middle-schoolers the school district includes James Monroe Middle School, and Murray Middle School. The district's primary high school, Sherman E Burroughs High School, serves Ridgecrest, China Lake NAWC, Inyokern, Buttermilk Acres, Red Mountain, and Randsburg. There is also an alternative high school, Mesquite High School. Ridgecrest Elementary Academy for Language, Music, and Science (REALMS)is a public charter school sponsored by the Kern County Office of Education. Opened in 2019, the school educates children from Transitional K to the 6th grade. The school campus was formerly a Transitional K to 8th grade school which operated from 2001 to 2018 under the name Ridgecrest Charter School.

Sierra Sands Unified School District
Grades	School	City
K-5	Faller Elementary School	Ridgecrest
K-5	Gateway Elementary School	Ridgecrest
K-5	Inyokern Elementary School	Inyokern
K-5	Las Flores Elementary School	Ridgecrest
K-5	Pierce Elementary School	Ridgecrest
K-5	Richmond Elementary School	Ridgecrest
K-5	Rand Elementary School	Johannesburg
6-8	James Monroe Middle School (closed)	Ridgecrest
6-8	China Lake Junior High	Ridgecrest
9-12	Sherman E. Burroughs High School	Ridgecrest
9-12	Mesquite High School (alternative)	Ridgecrest

=== College ===
Cerro Coso Community College, a part of the Kern Community College District, was established in 1973 and has a full-time enrollment of 2,347. The 420 acres (1.7 km^{2}) Indian Wells Valley Campus (IWV) is located in the upper Mojave Desert near Ridgecrest. The IWV Campus is the largest of the Cerro Coso campuses. It serves a population of about 50,000. The college serves the communities of Ridgecrest, China Lake, Inyokern, and Trona.

=== Public library ===
Ridgecrest Branch Library, a branch of the Kern County Library, serves Ridgecrest, Inyokern, China Lake, Trona and surrounding communities.

== Public safety ==
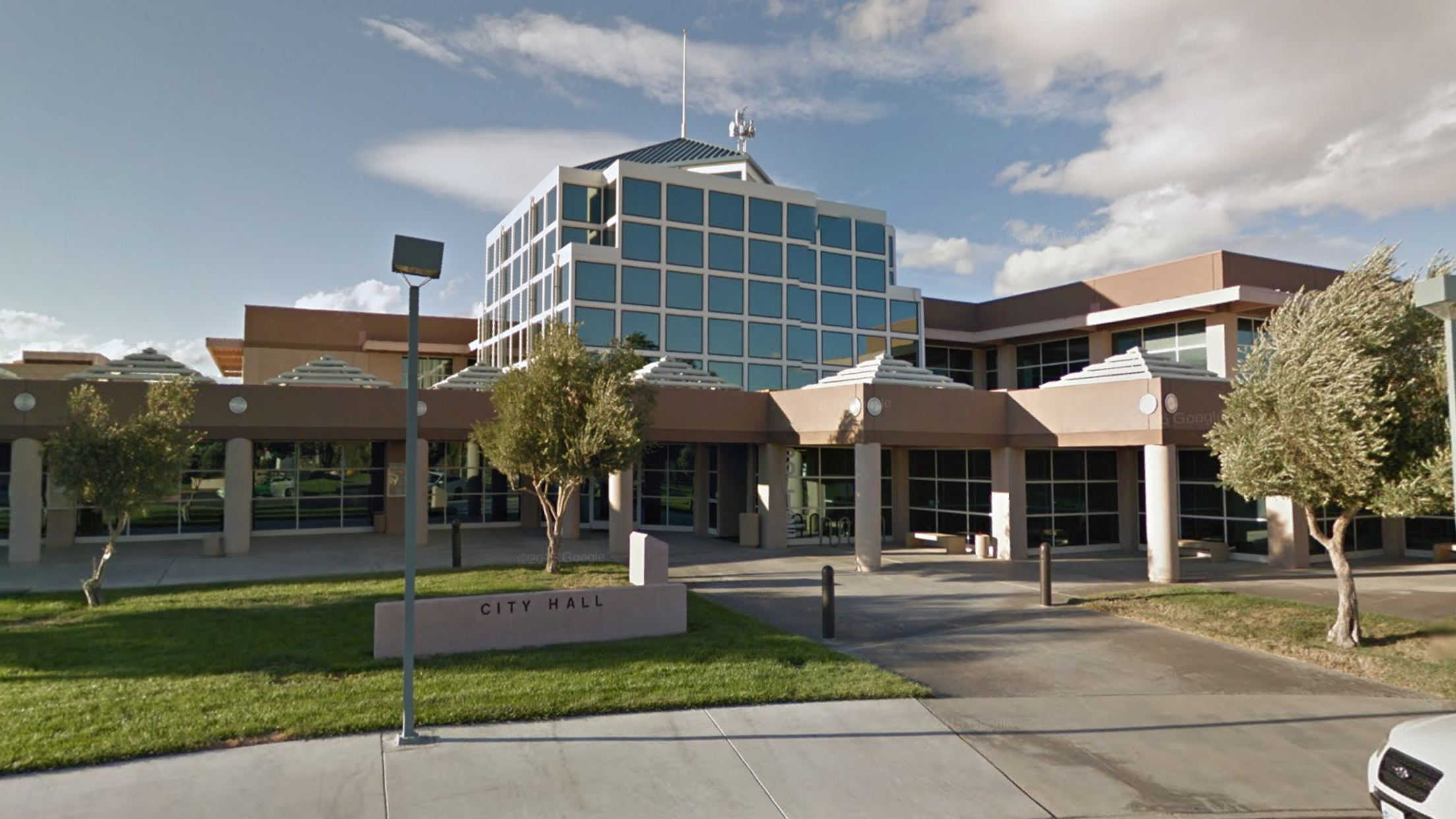
Ridgecrest City Hall and Police Headquarters

Ridgecrest has its own police department, as well as a regional station of the Kern County Sheriff's Department. The Kern County Fire Department provides fire protection and emergency medical services. Full-time law enforcement employees in 2008 numbered 56 (41 officers).

Crime statistics for 2011 (reported by the Ridgecrest Police Department):

- Homicide: 1
- Manslaughter by negligence: 0
- Robbery: 15
- Rape: 11
- Assault: 337
- Burglary: 192
- Theft: 292
- Auto theft: 37
- Arson: 14
- Total violent crimes: 364
- Total property crimes: 535
- Total crimes: 899
- Percentage change since prior period: -9%
- Calls for service: 33,440

== Notable people ==
Notable natives include:

- Rebekka Armstrong, Playboy Playmate and HIV/AIDS activist
- Ted Bachman, former American football defensive end, attended Burroughs High.
- Lacy Barnes-Mileham, (b. 1964), graduated Burroughs High (1983) and Fresno State (1988). Won U.S.A. Track and Field discus championships in 1999 and 1991, and competed in the 1996 Atlanta Olympics.
- Jerome Davis, sprinter
- Mark Hoppus, co-lead singer and bassist of the rock band Blink-182
- Jason Monks, politician and member of the Idaho House of Representatives
- Sabaa Tahir, author
- Guy Kyser, singer/songwriter of the rock band Thin White Rope

== Media ==
Looking south in Ridgecrest

Ridgecrest has one television station, KZGN-LD, owned by Wiknich Broadcasting Corp., that has 3 channels serving the entire Indian Wells Valley over the air and on Mediacom Cable. KZGN provides local news, weather and sports. KZGN also provides a daily local interview program, Ridgecrest Talk. Ridgecrest is served by two newspapers, The Daily Independent and the News Review, as well as a mixture of local broadcast stations and repeaters from radio and television stations based in Los Angeles and Bakersfield. The repeaters are operated by the IWV TV Booster. Radio stations in the area include KRSF 89.3 a Christian radio format with Radio 74; KZFX 93.7 a classic rock format with ABC and California news and weather; KSSI (FM) 102.7, broadcasting rock music, local news and weather; KLOA (AM) 1240, broadcasting CBS Sports Radio; KZIQ 92.7, featuring adult contemporary music; KRAJ The Heat 100.9 FM, featuring a hip-hop format; and K296AI the 107.1, with KCNV classical music feed. KRCK-1360, "Ridgecrest Radio", went off the air in the 1970s. Television repeater K05FO 5 rebroadcasts KTLA; and K35HO-D 35 rebroadcasts KBAK.

== In popular culture ==
External videos
- Sony - No More Shakes, YouTube video

In a 1996 Sony commercial, Ridgecrest is known as the "Earthquake Capital of the World".

The movie Holes (2003) was shot mainly in Ridgecrest.

Ridgecrest is mentioned in British-Swedish rapper and singer-songwriter Ecco2k's 2021 song Jalouse.

== Transportation ==
Ridgecrest is located at the junction of highways California State Route 178 and U.S. Route 395 (business route).

The city of Ridgecrest provides the Ridgecrest Transit shuttle bus service to and from Inyokern, connecting with the Eastern Sierra Transit Authority bus that serves Bishop and Mammoth Lakes to the north, and Lancaster (Metrolink station), with connections to the San Fernando Valley and Los Angeles, to the south. Kern Transit connects Ridgecrest to Lake Isabella and Mojave.

== See also ==
- Ridgecrest Regional Hospital
- Naval Air Weapons Station China Lake
