= Mat Roy Thompson =

American architect and civil engineer known for work on Scotty's Castle

- Born: Leroy Thompson; February 8, 1874; Dunlap, Iowa
- Died: June 8, 1962 (aged 88); Tacoma, Washington
- Other names: Matthew R. Thompson, Matt R. Thompson, Mathew R. Thompson, M. Roy Thompson, Roy Thompson
- Education: Rose Polytechnic; Stanford University
- Known for: Civil engineering projects including work on Scotty's Castle in what is now Death Valley National Park.
- Spouse(s): Patience O'Hara (c. 1896–1931); Ivah Thaxton (c. 1932–1962)
- Children: Philip Thompson (born 1896); Ralph E. Thompson (born 1899); Matthew R. Thompson (born 1900); Hugh O'Hara Thompson (born 1905); Patience Thompson (born 1910); Maxine Thompson (born 1915)
- Parent(s): George Washington Thompson; Susan Forrer

Mat Roy Thompson (February 8, 1874 – June 8, 1962), known also as Matt Roy Thompson, Matthew R. Thompson, Mathew R. Thompson, M. Roy Thompson, Roy Thompson, and Leroy Thompson, was a civil engineer and architect who worked on a great variety of construction and development projects across the United States, most notably on Scotty's Castle, the Death Valley mansion of eccentric millionaire Albert Mussey Johnson.

== Biography ==
=== Early years ===
Thompson was born Leroy Thompson in Dunlap, Iowa, in 1874, the son of George Washington Thompson, a real estate broker of comfortable, if moderate, means, and his wife Susan Forrer. Thompson's father moved his real estate business to Tacoma, Washington while Thompson was still very young, and so it was in the state of Washington that Thompson grew up. In 1890, upon reaching the age of sixteen, Thompson graduated from high school and promptly enrolled in the Rose Polytechnic Institute of Technology, an engineering and technical school in Terre Haute, Indiana.

When Stanford University opened its doors to students for the first time one year later in 1891, Thompson happily enrolled as a sophomore, one of only eleven upper classmen of a total 559 students. While continuing his study of civil engineering, Thompson met a pretty, young freshman student named Bessie Penniman. The pair attended many collegiate social events together, including the first football game between Stanford and rival University of California, Berkeley, during which Stanford's team was led to victory by fellow student and future American President, Herbert Hoover. It was not long before Thompson and Bessie were going steady, and then engaged to be married.

Bessie Penniman's family was extremely wealthy. Her father, Hiram Penniman, was a prominent early citizen of Walnut Creek, California and the creator of Shadelands Ranch. Bessie was Hiram's youngest daughter, and was much doted upon. As such, Hiram did not look kindly on Bessie's engagement to a less wealthy man. When Thompson's father lost what moderate wealth he had in the Panic of 1893, Bessie was forced to break off her engagement to Thompson and transfer from Stanford University to Cornell University on the opposite side of the United States. Thompson himself was forced to drop out of school and join his brothers in the workforce to help support his family.

Thompson obtained a job working in a sawmill back home in Tacoma. He and Bessie continued to correspond, but with decreasing frequency. At Cornell, Bessie met a new man, Albert Mussey Johnson, another engineering student, and became enamored. Albert Johnson graduated from Cornell in 1895, and married Bessie one year later. Thompson also wed in 1896, to a woman he had met in Tacoma, named Patience O'Hara.

It was not until 1904 that Thompson and Bessie saw each other again. Thompson and Patience's first child, Philip, was born in 1896, and by 1904 Patience had borne two more children, including a son named Matthew Roy Thompson, called Mat, in 1900. Albert Johnson and Bessie were en route to Alaska when they decided to stop over in Puget Sound for a visit with Thompson's young family. Johnson had been in a disastrous train accident in 1899 which had rendered him incapable of having children, so for Bessie, meeting Thompson's children was a glimpse of a life she might have had, and the beginning of a complex and ambiguous relationship with Thompson's third son, Mat.

Patience and Thompson eventually had six children together, and to support his growing family he took work in a variety of civil engineering capacities. Unfortunately for Patience, Thompson's work increasingly took him away from home for extended periods of time. In the years preceding World War I, Thompson signed on with a nationwide government program attempting to appraise the value of all the property owned by railroads as a prelude to the Interstate Commerce Commission increasing their management of American railroads. This job took him all across the country, and between 1919 and 1924 Thompson spent most of his time in Chicago. The lengthy separation between Thompson and his wife caused a great deal of strain on their marriage and may have engendered an estrangement between them.

Bessie and Albert Johnson kept their main residence in Chicago, where Albert's main business interests lay, and Thompson visited them frequently.

=== Scotty's Castle ===
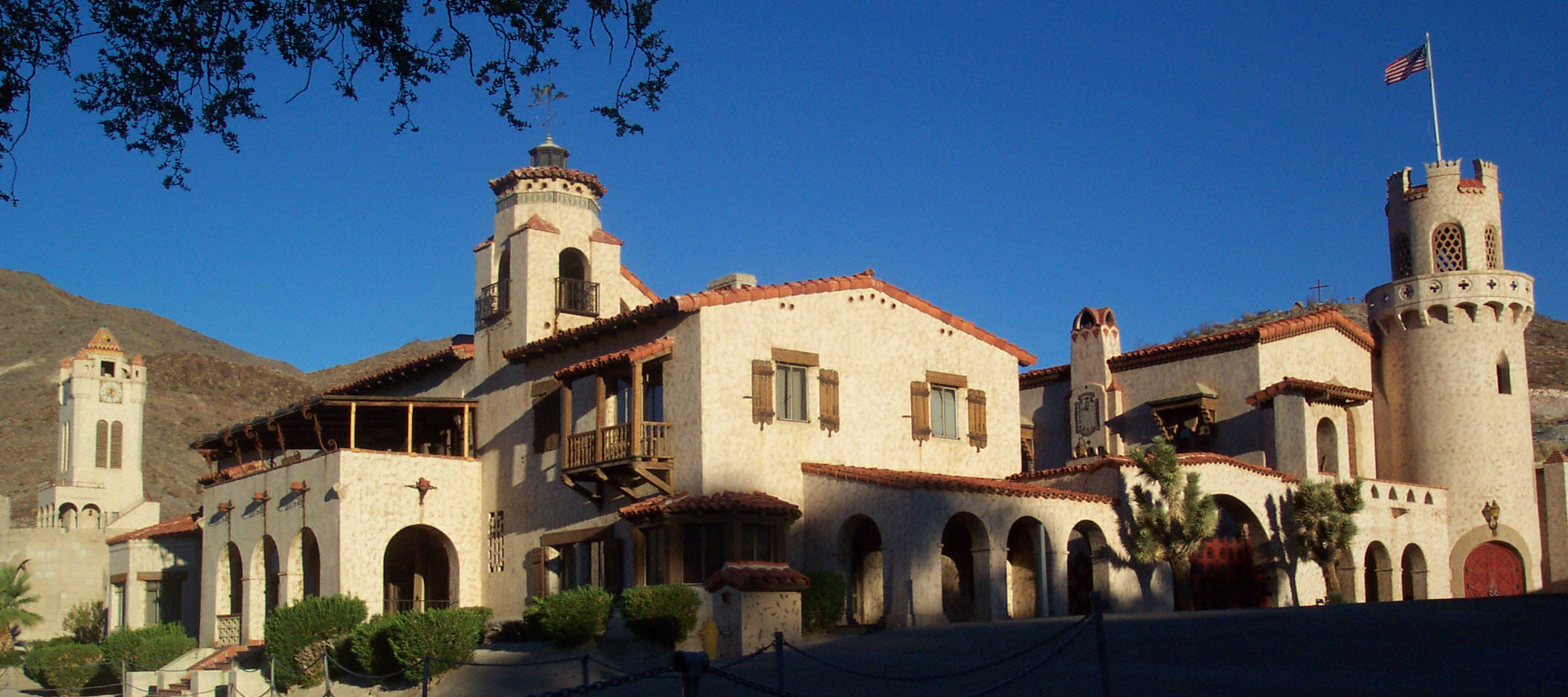
Scotty's Castle in completed form with Thompson's architectural improvements included.

By 1924, Thompson's work had taken him away from Chicago again, and he lost touch with the Johnsons. Bessie and Albert had begun the initial stages of construction of their vacation home at Death Valley Ranch in Death Valley, California, in 1922, and by late 1924 they had geared up for major construction and were looking for architects and engineers to help them materialize their dream.

In 1924, Mat Thompson, Mat Roy's eldest son, had taken a job as a Work Secretary for a YMCA Boys in Portland, Oregon. In a fit of nostalgia, he decided to write and send a short Christmas greeting to the Johnsons. Upon receiving Mat's card, Albert Johnson responded with a telegram asking to know the whereabouts of Mat's father. Mat complied, and soon Johnson offered the job of overseeing construction at Death Valley Ranch to Thompson. At the time, Thompson was living in Washington, D.C., and working as senior railroad appraiser with the Interstate Commerce Commission. Thompson took a one-year leave of absence from his government job and joined Bessie and Albert in Death Valley on November 6, 1925. After a quick assessment of the work to be done at Death Valley Ranch, Thompson realized a year would be insufficient, and uncertain of when the ranch would be completed, he quit his job in Washington, D.C. entirely.

Aside from some very specific technical advice and guidelines early on, Albert Johnson participated little in the construction process, and it was Bessie who worked closely with Thompson on the final design of what would become Scotty's Castle. Johnson had already had a building installed on the property as the main house that was generally described as a plain, stucco box. Although Johnson liked the plain, box-like design, and felt it "Symbolized that everything he did was on the square", Bessie thought it was ugly and was greatly pleased when Thompson presented her with a series of sketches that redesigned the stucco box as a Spanish revival-style hacienda, somewhat reminiscent of the style of the buildings the two of them had seen at Stanford.

Over the next six years, Thompson oversaw the construction crews and the logistical requirements of the great construction undertaking at Death Valley Ranch and Johnson's nearby property at Lower Vine Ranch. Johnson paid him a monthly salary of $400, half of which was sent home to Tacoma to support Patience and his brood of children. This money was no substitute for a husband, however, and in 1931 the long-estranged Patience O'Hara and Thompson divorced. Mere weeks later, construction at Death Valley Ranch ended due to Johnson's financial difficulties and a land ownership dispute.

=== Later years ===
Nearly broke and with no reason to return to Tacoma, Thompson moved the short distance to Reno, Nevada. Thompson had not been in Reno long when he entered into a relationship with an acquaintance of his, a Mrs. Ivah Thaxton, whom he had met while she was vacationing at Death Valley Ranch some time before with her husband, whom she had since divorced. Thompson and Ivah Thaxton were soon married.

Thompson wrote to Albert Johnson several times requesting work at the Death Valley Ranch should construction resume in the near future, even sending in a completely redundant résumé at one point. Johnson did later provide a few small jobs for Thompson at the castle, including recruiting him to complete some unattributed drawings in the Scotty's Castle guidebook Bessie had put together for tourists, and surveying a plot of land in Santa Maria, California, to investigate its ownership status. In 1947, late in Johnson's life, he tried to call back Thompson to oversee the completion of the swimming pool, though nothing came of it.

In lieu of further steady employment at the castle, Thompson resumed his engineering contracts with the government, and in January 1933, Thompson and his new wife had moved to Los Angeles to take up employment with the Metropolitan Water District and work on the new Los Angeles Colorado River Aqueduct.

Thereafter, Thompson turned his engineering focus to military and defense contracts. He helped plan and lay out a number of military bases worldwide, including Kadena Air Force Base in Okinawa, Japan.

Thompson finally retired in 1954 at the age of eighty. He died of natural causes near his boyhood home in Tacoma, Washington, on June 8, 1962, at the age of eighty-eight.

== Controversial personal life ==
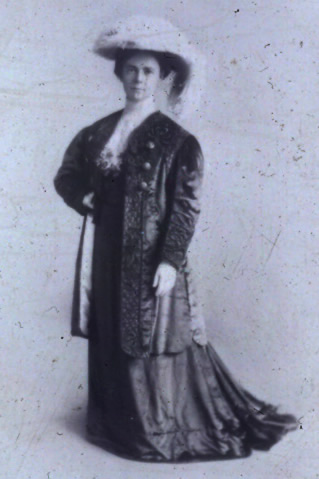
Portrait of a young Bessie Penniman in 1892, during her courtship with Thompson at Stanford.

=== Bessie and Thompson's romance ===
Many people in Thompson's life, his children and first wife included, were of the opinion that Thompson never really got over his first love, Bessie Johnson, née Penniman. The extent and frequency of the correspondence between the pair caused many of their acquaintances to be suspicious of the nature of Thompson and Bessie's friendship, particularly in light of the lifelong disabilities Albert Johnson acquired in a train accident in 1899, a few years after his marriage to Bessie. Many thought Bessie to be unfulfilled without the children she might otherwise have had, and in seeking to direct her energies elsewhere, therefore more inclined to dwell nostalgically on the relationships of her past.

==== The confession ====
To some extent, Thompson seems to have confirmed a number of the commonly held suspicions about himself and Bessie. Although generally a discreet man who kept his personal business to himself, the truth of the matter may have been too much for him to bear, and he confessed his feelings for Bessie in a letter to his then-wife Patience O'Hara. Patience describes the letter thus:

"...When [Thompson] was living in Chicago working for the R.R. he was with the Johnsons a great deal. [Thompson] wrote me at this time that 'Bessie was the one love of his life, that if he didn't see her for another 25 years he would love her just as much.' There were some other details about a pleaded for kiss, given or withheld, I am not sure which. I have forgotten, but at any rate, Bessie acted the correctly virtuous role. She was a strictly religious woman and no doubt disapproved of [Thompson]'s divorce, but being human, probably quietly cherished the thought that she was his real love..."

— Patience O'Hara, quoted in Scotty's Castle was Bessie's Baby

Certainly such a confession would be neither constructive nor welcome in most marriages, and though some claim that a long-standing estrangement between Patience and Thompson was what led to their eventual divorce in 1924, others attribute their separation in at least some part to meddling, either intentional or unintentional, by Bessie herself. While researching his father's involvement with Scotty's Castle for posterity in 1933, Thompson's son Mat discussed the issue with some of the castle's personnel, who would have had a better chance to observe Thompson and Bessie than Mat himself would have. Mat concluded:

"...I am inclined to accept Mr. Earls' observations as essentially true...I asked him if he thought that Mrs. J. had put Dad up to getting the divorce (it came at her suddenly) he said he didn't know, that he wouldn't put it past her..."

— Mat Thompson, Letter to Ralph E. Thompson

==== Johnson's involvement ====
Still others felt that some of the most compelling evidence for a secret romance between Thompson and his Bessie was provided by Albert Johnson himself in his treatment of Thompson. Young Mat and his sister Patience agreed that Johnson displayed at times hostile behavior towards their father. In a joint interview they asserted:

"There seemed to be a bit [of] a rivalry or some type of emotional condition between Albert Johnson and Thompson and it seemed that any time Mr. Johnson saw Roy Thompson's signature on a drawing or document, he would erase it."

— Shirley Harding, interviewer/paraphraser, Thompson Family Joint Interview

Indeed, Thompson was commissioned in 1941 by Johnson to complete a series of drawings of portions of Scotty's Castle for inclusion in a tourist booklet written by Bessie for the castle's tourists. As is common practice for artists, Thompson unobtrusively included his initials in the design of each picture. By the time the booklet was printed, however, his initials had been removed from all the images but one, which young Mat speculated may have been well-enough disguised as part of the design that they were overlooked. Johnson is also credited with vehemently opposing Thompson's divorce from Patience O'Hara, appealing to both Thompson and Patience to reconsider, but to no avail. It is unclear whether his motives in opposing the divorce were religious or personal.

=== Bessie and young Mat ===
"In 1920, I spent six weeks with my father whose office at the time was in Aurora, Illinois, not far from Chicago. Dad and I spent a few week-ends with the Johnsons. Once when Bessie and I happened to be alone, she said to me with some feeling, 'I almost feel like you were my own son.'"

— Mat Thompson, Scotty's Castle was Bessie's Baby

=== Thompson's philandering ===
"...Dad was pretty free with his hands on one of Earls' wives which Earls did not resent, but [he] told Mrs. Earls to smack him in a strategic place if she didn't like [it], [and] she brought Dad to terms; Dad's practices with women are in his 'head', he will paw them but not rape them; Johnson had his women and Mrs. Johnson had Dad..."

— Mat Thompson, Letter to Ralph E. Thompson

== Thompson's engineering projects ==
- University Land Company (1897 – 1901)
- Assistant State Engineer, Washington (1901–1907)
- County Engineer, Pierce County, Washington (1913 – 1915)
- State Highway Superintendent, Washington (1915 – 1917)
- Major Edward Bowes & John H. Spring
  - Layout of Regents Park, Tacoma, Washington
  - Layout of Thousand Oaks, Berkeley, California.
- Interstate Commerce Commission, Appraisal Board, (1918–1925)
  - Railroad Appraisal Engineer
- Scotty's Castle construction engineer, Death Valley, California (1925–1931)
- Metropolitan Water District appraisal engineer, Los Angeles, California, (1931–1940)
  - Los Angeles Colorado River Aqueduct
- Kisner, Curtis, & Wright
  - Mojave Air Base layout (1942)
  - Roosevelt Base, Terminal Island, California
- Holmes and Narver, Inc., Senior Civil Engineer (1943–1952)
  - China Lake Naval Ordnance Test Station primary feasibility studies, Inyokern, California
  - Bikini atomic tests
  - Kadena Air Force Base planning, Okinawa, Japan (1948)
  - Eniwetok Proving Ground atomic tests, Marshall Islands (1952)

== Adventures in civil engineering ==
=== A road trip ===
Over the course of his successful career, Thompson was one of the most innovative pioneers of modern civil engineering. While working as county engineer of Pierce County, Washington, Thompson began experimenting with designing the county road system around automobiles, a contraption he envisioned as the most important means of transportation of the future. Between 1913 and 1914 Thompson toured the United States in a Model T to examine local road systems nationwide to get ideas about what kind of roads would be both most well-suited for automobiles and most well-suited for Pierce County itself. The roads he ended up settling on were nine feet wide and made of concrete. He felt these roads were an excellent compromise between traffic efficiency and budget, so as to enable the building of a maximum mileage of roads across Pierce County. When Thompson left his job with Pierce County in 1915 after the completion of his road building project, it was said that only one other county in the entire United States contained more miles of paved road than Pierce.

=== His just deserts ===
Although the education Thompson received during his time at both Rose Polytechnic and Stanford totaled to the equivalent of a full college degree, his family's financial situation after the Panic of 1893 and the subsequent necessity of his dropping out of school meant that Thompson never acquired some of the formal documents his fellow students did to attest to his skill. Later in his career as such things were becoming more formalized, Thompson applied for a California Landscape Architect's license. He was told he would need to pass an exam to be awarded the license, and he readily agreed. On the appointed day Thompson was handed the test, but after looking it over he protested that he would be unable to take it after all. It turned out that the exam was one that he himself had written some years earlier. Needless to say, he got his license.

=== Age before beauty ===
In 1947, when Thompson's then-employer, Holmes & Narver, Inc., made clear that their contract to lay out the air force base at Kadena would require the input of an engineer with Thompson's skill at landscape and drainage design, 73-year-old Thompson requested to be sent to Okinawa to work on the project. Holmes & Narver initially rejected Thompson's request because of his age, but when their two younger landscape engineers failed the required physical examination, Thompson was selected by default.

== Thompson's name ==
There is a great deal of confusion surrounding Thompson's name. Thompson's birth name in 1874 was Leroy Thompson. The boy then known as Leroy, or often simply "Roy", lacked the middle name that was the fashion of the time. A relative of Thompson's, whom some sources say was his cousin and others say was his uncle, felt it would be more appropriate for young Roy to have the more fashionable three names. This relative, who was himself named Mat, proposed to Roy that he take on the name "Mat" in exchange for the gift of a pony, which he would receive upon reaching the age of 21. Thompson happily complied and allowed his name to be changed to Mat Roy. However, as the name Mat was a late addition, it remained fairly superfluous throughout most of Thompson's early life, with his family and close friends continuing to refer to him simply as Roy.

Thompson began to embrace his full name once he became an adult, and began billing himself as M. Roy Thompson in professional settings. In the late 1930s, the fashion for names shifted, and it became standard practice for men to refer to themselves in the formula of "First name, middle initial, last name" rather than the previous formula which placed the emphasis on the middle name. Thompson began to refer to himself as Mat R. Thompson, but to his dismay, he quickly discovered that this version of his name led to great confusion. Secretaries, bookkeepers, and acquaintances of his all assumed that his name "Mat" was a nickname, and began referring to him both verbally and on written record as Matt R. Thompson, Matthew R. Thompson, and Mathew R. Thompson, all incorrect. To further complicate matters, when Thompson later attempted to turn his engineering skills to national defense work, the birth certificate he obtained for his background check by the government listed him under his legal birth name, Leroy Thompson, a name which had no bearing whatsoever on the names he was now known by.

To clear things up once and for all, Thompson pursued the legal change of his name to Matthew Roy Thompson. This name was, however, also the name Thompson had given his third son upon his birth in 1900. Thompson and his son, Mat, liked to joke that in spite of Thompson being the elder of the two men, Mat was in fact "Matthew R. Thompson, Sr.", and Thompson was "Matthew R. Thompson, Jr." because of the order in which they had been named.

== See also ==
- Scotty's Castle
- Bessilyn Johnson
- Albert Mussey Johnson
- Death Valley National Park

== Sources ==
- Bessie Johnson vertical file, Scotty's Castle Resource Library, NPS: DEVA.
- Henderson, Randall. "He Built Scotty's Castle...", Desert Magazine, September, 1952; Pg 4-10.
- Historic Structure Report, Special Interpreter's Edition. Scotty's Castle Resource Library, NPS: DEVA.
  - Appendix A, Biographies of Significant Individuals Associated with Death Valley Ranch.
- Livingston, Dewey. Historic Resource Study: Death Valley Scotty Historic District, Draft Version, Scotty's Castle Resource Library, NPS: DEVA.
- Mat Roy Thompson vertical file, Scotty's Castle Resource Library, NPS: DEVA.
  - Harding, Shirley. "Thompson Family Joint Interview." Mat Roy Thompson vertical file, Scotty's Castle Resource Library, NPS: DEVA.
  - Thompson, Mat. "Letter to Ralph E. Thompson." Mat Roy Thompson vertical file, Scotty's Castle Resource Library, NPS: DEVA.
  - Thompson, Mat. "Scotty's Castle was Bessie's Baby." Mat Roy Thompson vertical file, Scotty's Castle Resource Library, NPS: DEVA.
    - Section: Divorce
    - Section: Facts
    - Section: Finale
    - Section: Off Dead Center
    - Section: The String Bass and the Etchings
- "Matt R. Thompson, Son of Veteran Who Fought in Battle of Gettysburg, and Builder of the Famous Death Valley Palace, is Visiting Here". The Gettysburg Times, July 27, 1956.
- Osness, Richard D. Of Lions and Dreams, of Men and Realities: An Illustrated History of Fircrest, Washington. Bicentennial Issue, 1976.
