= Bessilyn Johnson =

Impetus for building Scotty's Castle

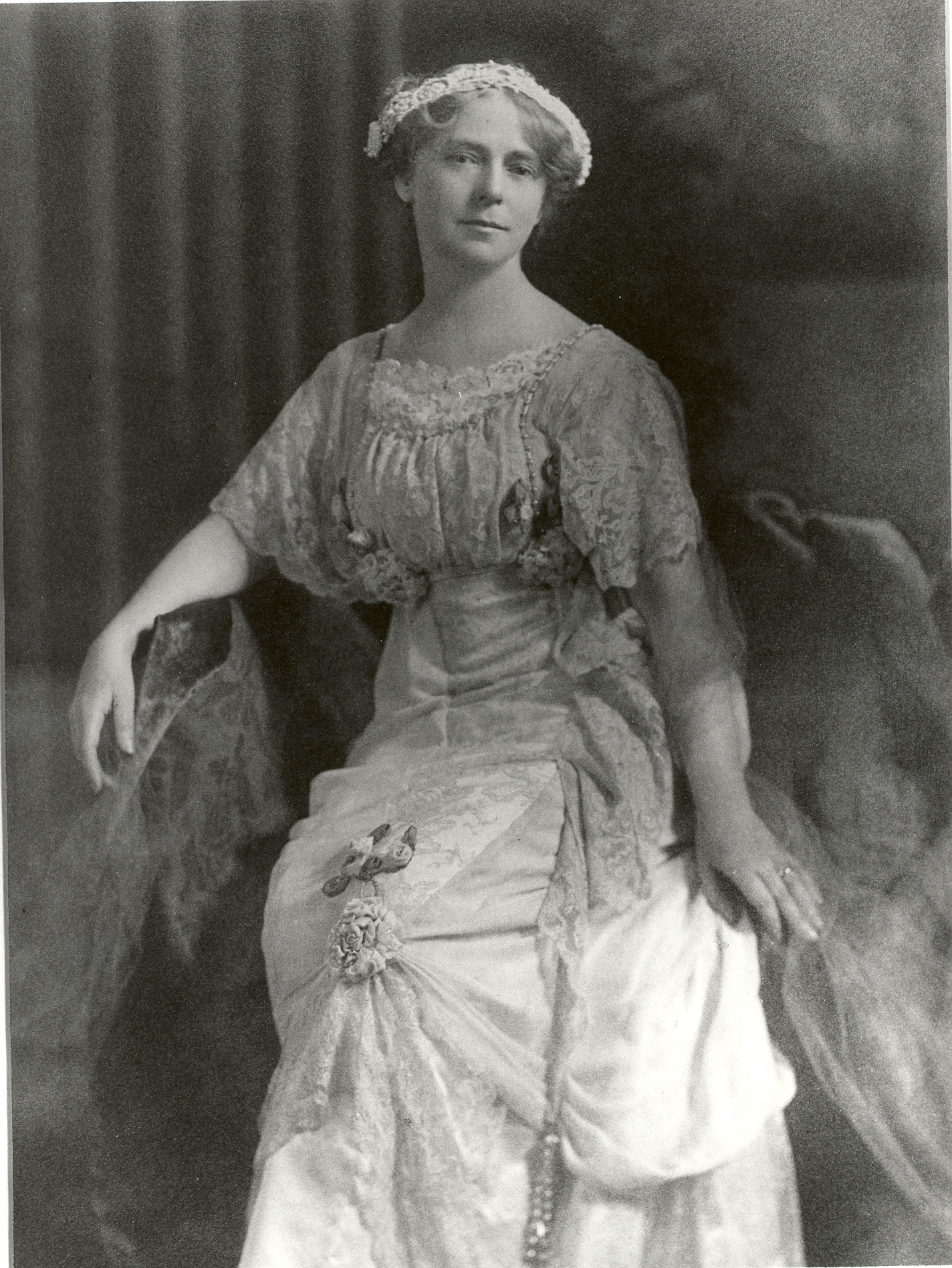
- Born: Bessilyn Morris Penniman; January 14, 1871; Walnut Creek, California, US
- Died: April 22, 1943 (aged 72); Death Valley, California, US
- Resting place: Oberlin, Ohio
- Education: Stanford University; Cornell University
- Known for: Impetus for building Scotty's Castle in what is now Death Valley National Park.
- Spouse: Albert Mussey Johnson
- Parent(s): Hiram Penniman; Carrie Penniman

Bessilyn Johnson (January 14, 1871 – April 22, 1943), known also as "Bessie" or "Mabel", was the wife of the Chicago millionaire Albert Johnson, a man who was variously the partner, friend and dupe of the famed American Old West figure Death Valley Scotty. Bessie was one of the main characters who provided the impetus for the construction of Scotty's Castle in what is now Death Valley National Park in California.

== Early years ==
Bessie was born Bessilyn Morris Penniman in 1872, daughter of Hiram Penniman and the only child of his second wife, Carrie. Hiram Penniman was the founder and owner of Shadelands Ranch in Walnut Creek, California, as well as one of Walnut Creek's most prominent early citizens. Bessie was the youngest of Hiram's children and was doted upon. She entered Stanford University in 1891, a member of its first incoming freshman class, and a classmate of the future President Herbert Hoover.

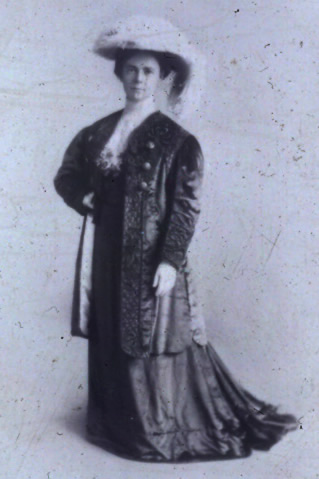
Portrait of a young Bessie Penniman in 1892, not long before she transferred to Cornell University where she met her future husband, Albert Johnson.

While at Stanford, Bessie met and became close friends with a young engineering student, Mat Roy Thompson. The two became sweethearts, and later engaged to be married. After Mat Roy's family lost their moderate fortune in the Panic of 1893, Bessie was forced to break off her engagement to him, and immediately transfer to Cornell University.

While at Cornell, Bessie met another young engineering student by the name of Albert Mussey Johnson. Bessie and Albert later married and moved to Chicago, where his business interests lay. Bessie had been given a religious upbringing and busied herself in Chicago trying to do good works. Among the tasks she undertook was taking women of ill repute into her own home in the hope that exposure to genteel surroundings would provide them with moral rehabilitation.

In 1904, Albert and his business partner, Edward A. Shedd, were introduced to Death Valley Scotty through an intermediary, Obadiah Sands, and began investing in Scotty's gold mine scam, not yet aware of its fraudulent nature. In 1915, Albert Johnson decided to visit Scotty in Death Valley in the hopes of seeing the mine he had been promised a one-third share in. The mine did not exist, but Albert eventually decided its existence was not important. He discovered he enjoyed Scotty's company, and also enjoyed camping in Death Valley as its dry climate and the exercise he had while accompanying Scotty improved his health significantly. After a few years, Bessie grew curious about the appeal of Death Valley and began joining her husband on his annual outings with Scotty. She eventually determined that although she wished to continue to accompany her husband on his Wild West vacations, she would prefer to do so in the comfort of a vacation home, and construction of Scotty's Castle began.

== Later years ==
Once the decision had been made to build a vacation home in Death Valley, Albert purchased the Steinenger Ranch, which consisted of about 1,500 acres (6.1 km^{2}) of land in what is now Death Valley National Park. In 1922, the Johnsons began building, adding on to their new "castle" in fits and spurts however inspiration struck them. Bessie ensured that her former sweetheart Mat Roy Thompson was hired to oversee the construction project, and although the nature of their relationship remains unclear, Roy's son, Mat Roy Thompson, Jr., confirmed much later his firm belief that Mat Roy's involvement with the construction of Scotty's Castle contributed directly towards his divorce from his first wife, Patience O'Hara.

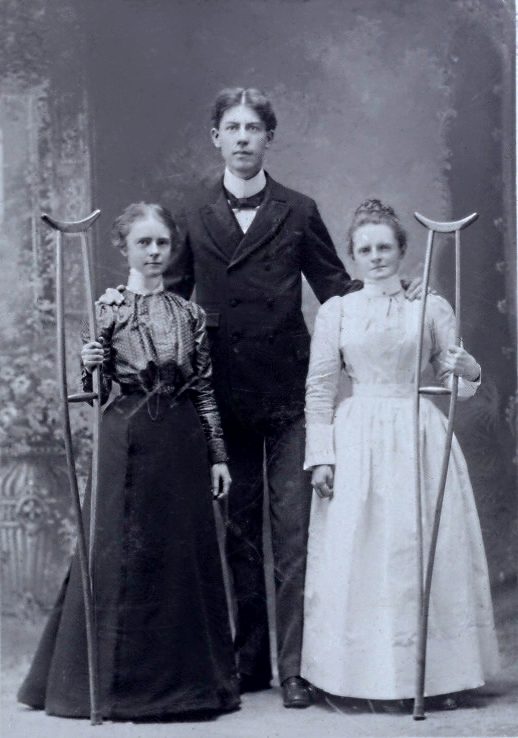
Bessie (left) and a nurse assist Albert Johnson with his crutches after his injury in an 1899 train accident.

Aside from the break necessitated by five years of a land ownership dispute brought on by Herbert Hoover's early efforts to create Death Valley National Monument, the Johnsons vacationed in their Death Valley "castle" regularly until 1943, when Bessie was killed in an automobile accident at Towne Pass while she and Albert were driving through Death Valley.

Due to Albert Johnson's poor health following severe injury in a train accident in 1899, Bessie and Albert were never able to have children. After Bessie's death, Albert stopped visiting Scotty's Castle altogether. Because of a lack of heirs, when Albert died of cancer in 1948 he left their Death Valley properties to the Gospel Foundation, a charitable organization that he had created in 1946 for that very purpose.

== Bessie's religion ==
In 1914, Bessie converted to the evangelical Christian church of the charismatic preacher Paul Rader. She later brought Albert into the fold, and the two of them shared a close personal relationship with Rader, to the point of purchasing a home for him next door to their own mansion in Chicago, and Albert paying Rader's personal salary out of his own pocket so that Rader could remain above any possible suspicion of dipping into the funds donated to his church for good works.

Bessie was, at least outwardly, devoutly religious. She hosted her own religious radio show in Chicago directed towards the spiritual needs of the working woman, and also wrote articles for a religious newsletter published by Rader. Bessie spent a good deal of her time at Scotty's Castle writing sermons that she would preach on Sundays. Among the employees hired to work on the construction of the castle, Bessie had a reputation for being overly staid, and possibly a bit crazy. Her sermons were said to be a "torment", and were frequently more than two hours long. Bessie styled her preacher persona after that of the evangelical darling Aimee Semple McPherson, wearing flowing white and red robes and a tiara during her sermons, and always carrying a Bible with a red ribbon in it.

== Sources ==
- Albert Johnson vertical file, Scotty's Castle Resource Library, NPS: DEVA.
- Bessie Johnson vertical file, Scotty's Castle Resource Library, NPS: DEVA.
- Bessie Johnson: Death vertical file, Scotty's Castle Resource Library, NPS: DEVA.
- Bessie Johnson: Religion vertical file, Scotty's Castle Resource Library, NPS: DEVA.
- Dubovay, Charles. Interview, Scotty's Castle Resource Library, NPS: DEVA.
- Mat Roy Thompson vertical file, Scotty's Castle Resource Library, NPS: DEVA.
- Historic Resource Study: Death Valley Scotty Historic District, Draft Version, Scotty's Castle Resource Library, NPS: DEVA.
