= Shadelands Ranch =

- Shadelands Ranch House
- U.S. National Register of Historic Places
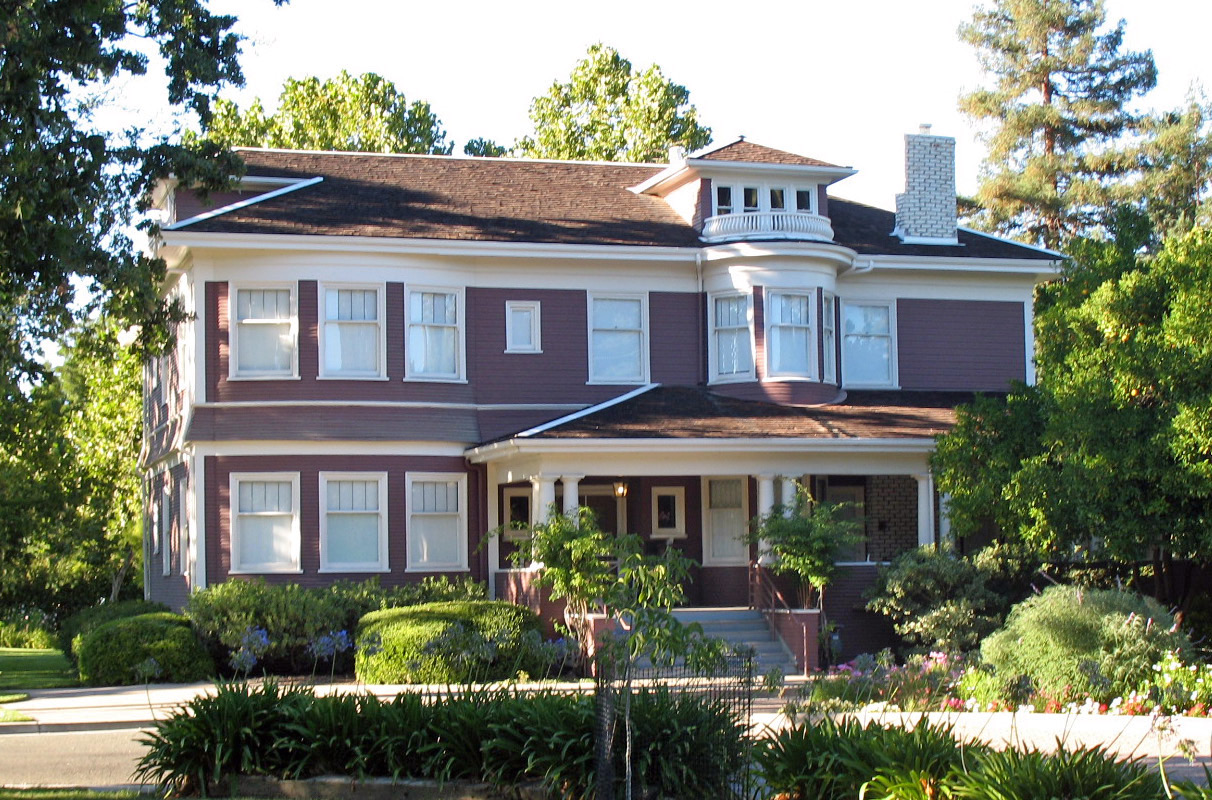
- Shadelands Ranch House

- Location within California
- Location: 2660 Ygnacio Valley Rd., Walnut Creek, California
- Coordinates: 37°55′34″N 122°1′10″W
- Area: 2.7 acres (1.1 ha)
- Built: 1902
- Architects: Eckers & Sells
- Architectural style: Colonial Revival
- NRHP reference No.: 85001915
- Added to NRHP: August 29, 1985

Shadelands Ranch was established by Hiram Penniman, an early American settler of California in 1856 as one of the first and largest farms in California's Ygnacio Valley.

Penniman arrived in California in 1853 and three years later purchased 500 acres (2.0 km^{2}) of land from Encarnación Pacheco, daughter of Juana Sanchez de Pacheco, then owner of Rancho Arroyo de Las Nueces y Bolbones from which the 500 acres (2.0 km^{2}) were taken.

Penniman planted a variety of fruit and nuts, including peaches, pears, apricots, grapes, almonds, and walnuts, as well as prunes, which served as Penniman's most important and most profitable crop. The original name of Penniman's ranch was "Shadelands Fruit Farm". Hiram Penniman fell ill in January 1897 and care and oversight of the ranch became largely the responsibility of Penniman's oldest daughter, Mary. The ranch fell on hard times with a drop in the price of crops and Mary had to depend on the charity of her sister Bessie's wealthy husband to take care of many of the ranch's financial concerns.

When Hiram finally died, ownership of the ranch passed to Mary, then subsequently to Bessie after Mary's death in 1909. Bessie and her husband Albert Johnson mainly managed the ranch from afar, as Albert's business concerns lay mainly in distant Chicago. In 1921, Bessie hired Edmund Moyer to reside at the ranch with his family and supervise it. Bessie died in 1943 in a car accident, and not long after, Albert himself became severely ill. In 1947, with an eye to his own mortality, Albert Johnson formed the Gospel Foundation, an organization meant to oversee his extensive assets after his death. Johnson died in 1948 of cancer, and deeded all his property to the Gospel Foundation, including Shadelands.

The Gospel Foundation continued to administer Shadelands until 1970, when they gave the remaining 1.5 acres (6,100 m^{2}) of land and the ranch house to the city of Walnut Creek, California. Today it is managed by the Walnut Creek Historical Society, and has been open to the public since 1972 as a historical museum, the ranch house still furnished with much of the Pennimans' original furniture. The house was placed on the National Register of Historic Places in 1985.

== See also ==
- National Register of Historic Places listings in Contra Costa County, California
