= Scotty's Castle =

- Scotty's Castle (Death Valley Scotty Historic District)
- U.S. National Register of Historic Places
- U.S. Historic district
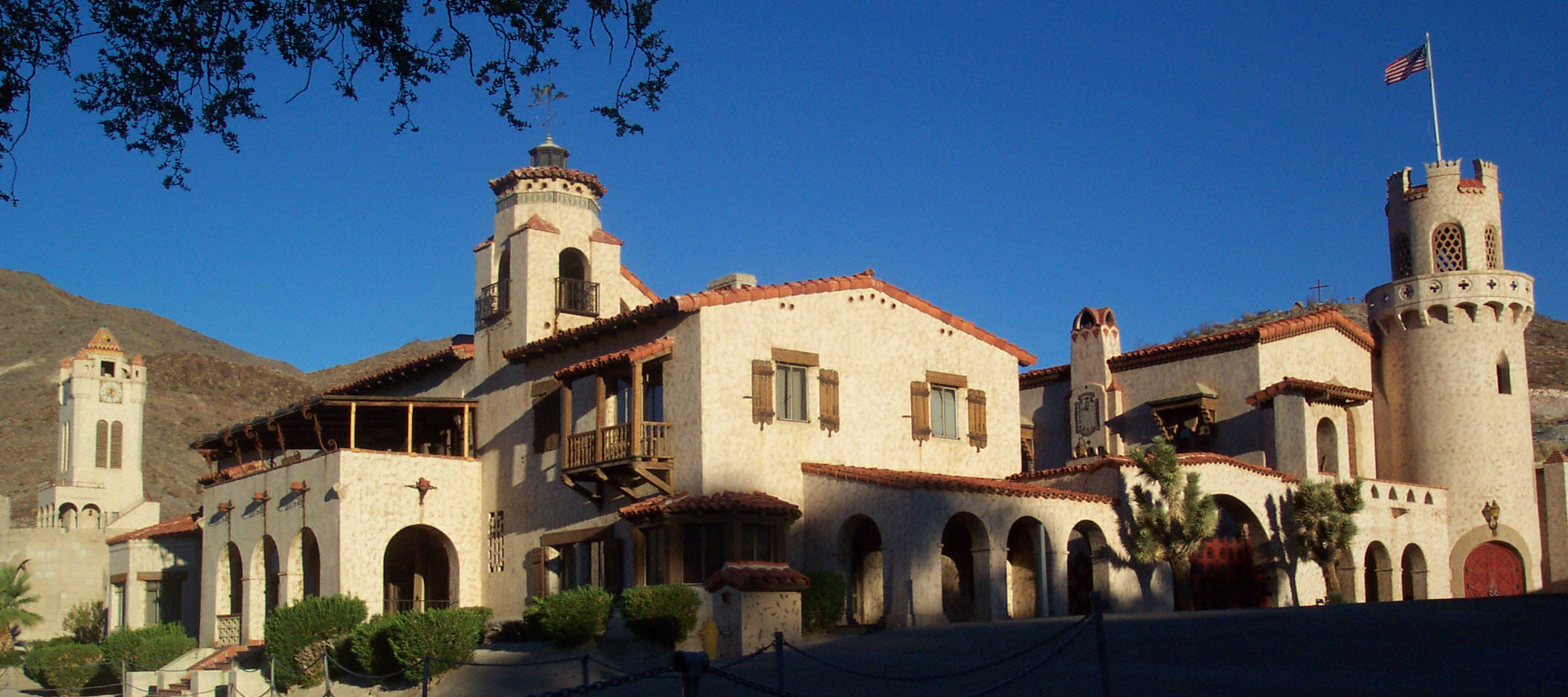
- Scotty's Castle

- Location within California Location within the United States
- Location: Death Valley National Park
- Nearest city: Beatty, Nevada, USA
- Coordinates: 37°1′56″N 117°20′29.4″W
- Area: 719.57 ha (1,778.1 acres)
- Built: 1922 - 1931
- Architect: Martin de Dubovay
- Engineer: Mat Roy Thompson
- Designer: Charles Alexander MacNeilledge
- Architectural style: Provincial Spanish (Mexican, Spanish, and Mediterranean influences)
- NRHP reference No.: 78000297
- Added to NRHP: July 20, 1978

Scotty's Castle (also known as Death Valley Ranch) is a two-story Mission Revival and Spanish Colonial Revival style villa located in the Grapevine Mountains of northern Death Valley in Death Valley National Park, California, US. Scotty's Castle is named for gold prospector Walter E. Scott, although Scott never owned it, nor is it an actual castle.

The ranch is located about 45 miles (72 km) north of Stovepipe Wells, California, via California State Route 190 to Scotty's Castle Road, or about a three-hour drive from Las Vegas, Nevada.

Scotty's Castle was severely damaged by flooding in October 2015, and a fire in 2021 that destroyed the historic garage/workshop that was used as the visitor center. These caused Scotty's Castle to be temporarily closed to the public and remains closed through at least 2026.

== History ==
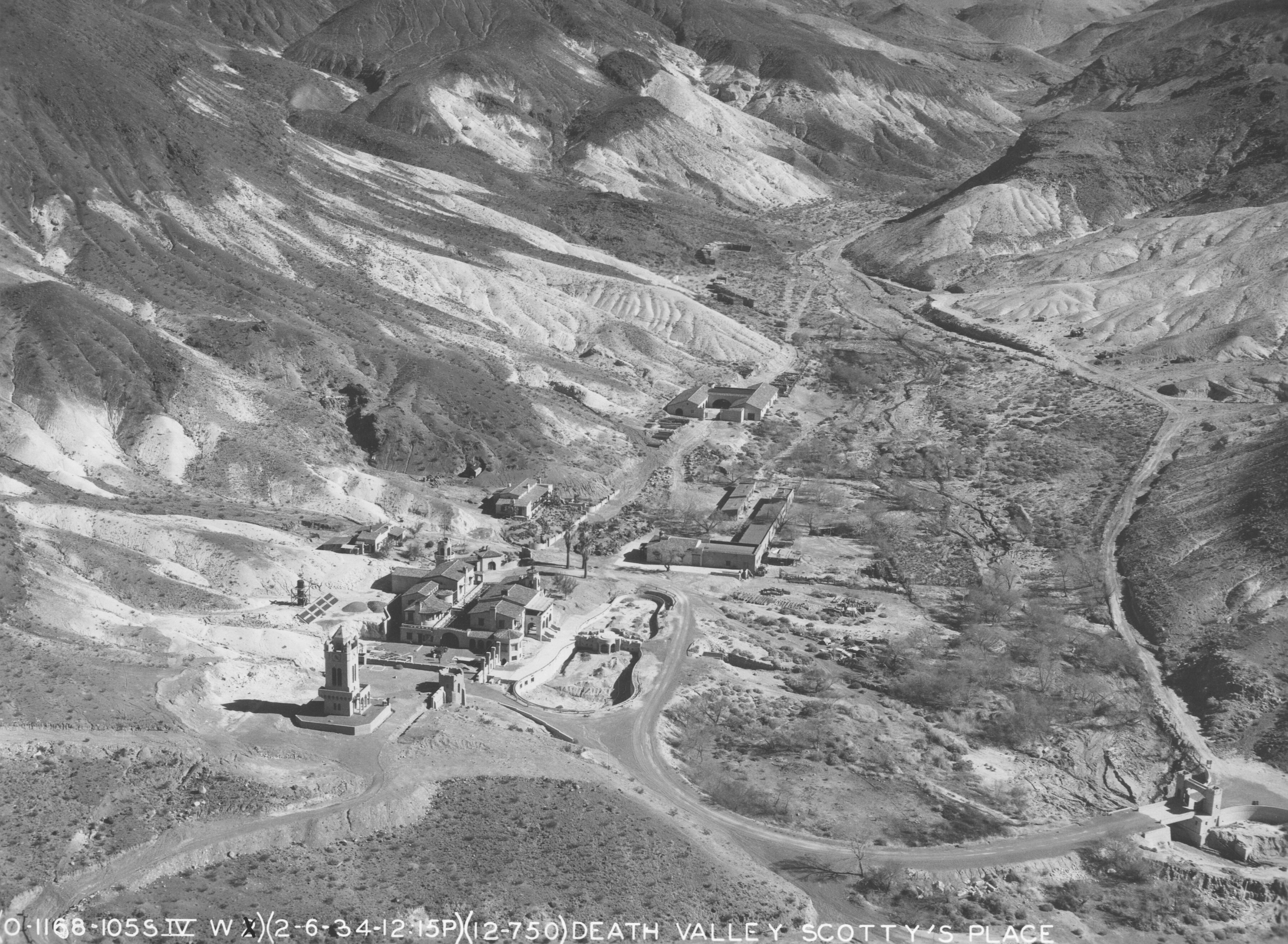
Aerial view, 1934

Construction began on Scotty's Castle in 1922, and cost between $1.5 and $2.5 million. Prospector, performer, and con man Walter Scott, born in Cynthiana, Kentucky, also known as "Death Valley Scotty," convinced Chicago millionaire Albert Mussey Johnson to invest in Scott's gold mine in the Death Valley area. Though initially angered when the mine turned out to be fraudulent, Johnson was fascinated with the colorful Scott and the two men struck up an unlikely friendship. By 1937, Johnson had acquired more than 1,500 acres (610 ha) in Grapevine Canyon, where the ranch is located.

After Johnson and his wife Bessie made several trips to the region, and his health improved, construction began. It was Mrs. Johnson's idea to build something comfortable for their vacations in the area, and the villa eventually became a winter home.

The Johnsons hired Martin de Dubovay as the architect, Mat Roy Thompson as the engineer and head of construction, and Charles Alexander MacNeilledge as the designer.

Unknown to the Johnsons, the initial survey was incorrect, and the land they built Death Valley Ranch on was actually government land; their land was farther up Grapevine Canyon. Construction halted as they resolved this mistake, but before it could resume, the stock market crashed in 1929, making it difficult for Johnson to finish construction. Having lost a considerable amount of money, the Johnsons used the Death Valley Ranch to produce income by letting rooms out, upon the suggestion of Scott.

The Johnsons died without heirs and had hoped that the National Park Service would purchase the property, and in 1970, the National Park Service purchased the villa for $850,000 from the Gospel Foundation (the socially-oriented charity Johnson founded in 1946), to which the Johnsons had left the property. Walter Scott, who was taken care of by the Gospel Foundation after Johnson's death, died in 1954 and was buried on the hill overlooking Scotty's Castle.

== Water and electricity ==
The springs of Grapevine Canyon provided the water supply for the ranch and were used to generate electricity. The springs, located about 300 feet (91 m) higher than the villa, generated enough water flow and pressure to turn a Pelton wheel, which ran the generator that furnished the villa's electricity. The power was regulated and backed up by the large bank of nickel–iron batteries in the house's tunnels. The springs provided enough water to meet all the needs of the ranch, with enough left for other uses.

A water fountain was constructed in the Great Hall, where water dripped down a rock face creating evaporative cooling and into a catch basin for recirculation. A 1930s solar water heater, much larger than today's solar water heaters, is near the main house, and a large stock of railroad ties salvaged from the Tonopah and Tidewater Railroad is in the area.

== 2015 flood damage ==
On October 18, 2015, the Death Valley area was hit by a significant rain storm, receiving nearly 3 inches (7.6 cm) of rain as the storm stalled over the Grapevine Canyon area for five hours. Flash flooding struck Scotty's Castle, leaving mud and debris stacked along the perimeter of the structures, up to 1 foot (30 cm) high inside the visitor center, and the access road to the property was destroyed. The flood caused the property to be closed for an extended period of time while repairs to the property are carried out and a new access road is built. The NPS has stated that the castle itself is not likely to re-open to the public until 2023, though "flood recovery tours" of the grounds happened between December 2017 and April 14, 2018.

== 2021 outbuildings fire ==
A fire on April 22, 2021, destroyed the historic garage/workshop dating from 1922 that was used as the visitor center, along with another historic outbuilding on the property. Upon investigation, the California Department of Forestry and Fire Protection reported that the fire started inside the Visitor Center. However, investigators were not able to conclusively determine the cause of the fire. While the main castle building was unscathed, this delayed the property rehabilitation efforts and pushed back the public reopening until 2023. The National Park Service intends to rebuild the garage/workshop.

== In popular culture ==
Scotty's Castle was featured in a 2023 episode of the paranormal reality show Ghost Adventures, coming as a result of several claims surrounding the location being haunted. These claims revolve around allegations and interviews regarding Walter Scott, the 2015 flood, the 2021 fire, and recountings of activity in the mansion. The Ghost Adventures team experienced several instances of what they interpreted as paranormal activity, including electronic voice phenomenon recordings (EVPs) and strange SLS camera footage, IR footage and photographs.

== Tours ==
=== In person ===
As a results of the 2015 flood damage and 2021 outbuildings fire, the castle and grounds are closed to the public except for specifically Flood Recovery ticketed tours.

Approximately 100,000 people tour the villa each year. The Johnsons' original furnishings and clothing can still be seen today. The National Park Service gives guided tours of Scotty's Castle for a fee. Park rangers dress in 1930s style clothes to help take the visitor back in time. During the tour, guests are treated to the sounds of a 1,121-pipe Welte theater organ.

An underground mystery tour is also available for those wishing to see the inner workings of the building. One-quarter mile of tunnels run under the building, where visitors can visit the powerhouse and see thousands of tiles that were to be used for the never-finished swimming pool. The tunnels also contain hundreds of nickel-iron battery cells, used to regulate power and provide backup power. The main house tour is ADA accessible, but the underground tour is not.

=== Virtual reality ===
Scotty's Castle can be toured in 3D virtual reality from a computer, smartphone, or with VR goggles on the Death Valley Conservancy Website - the result of a collaboration between the Death Valley Conservancy and the National Park Service.

== See also ==
- Death Valley National Park
