= Death Valley National Park =

National park in California and Nevada, United States

- IUCN category II (national park)
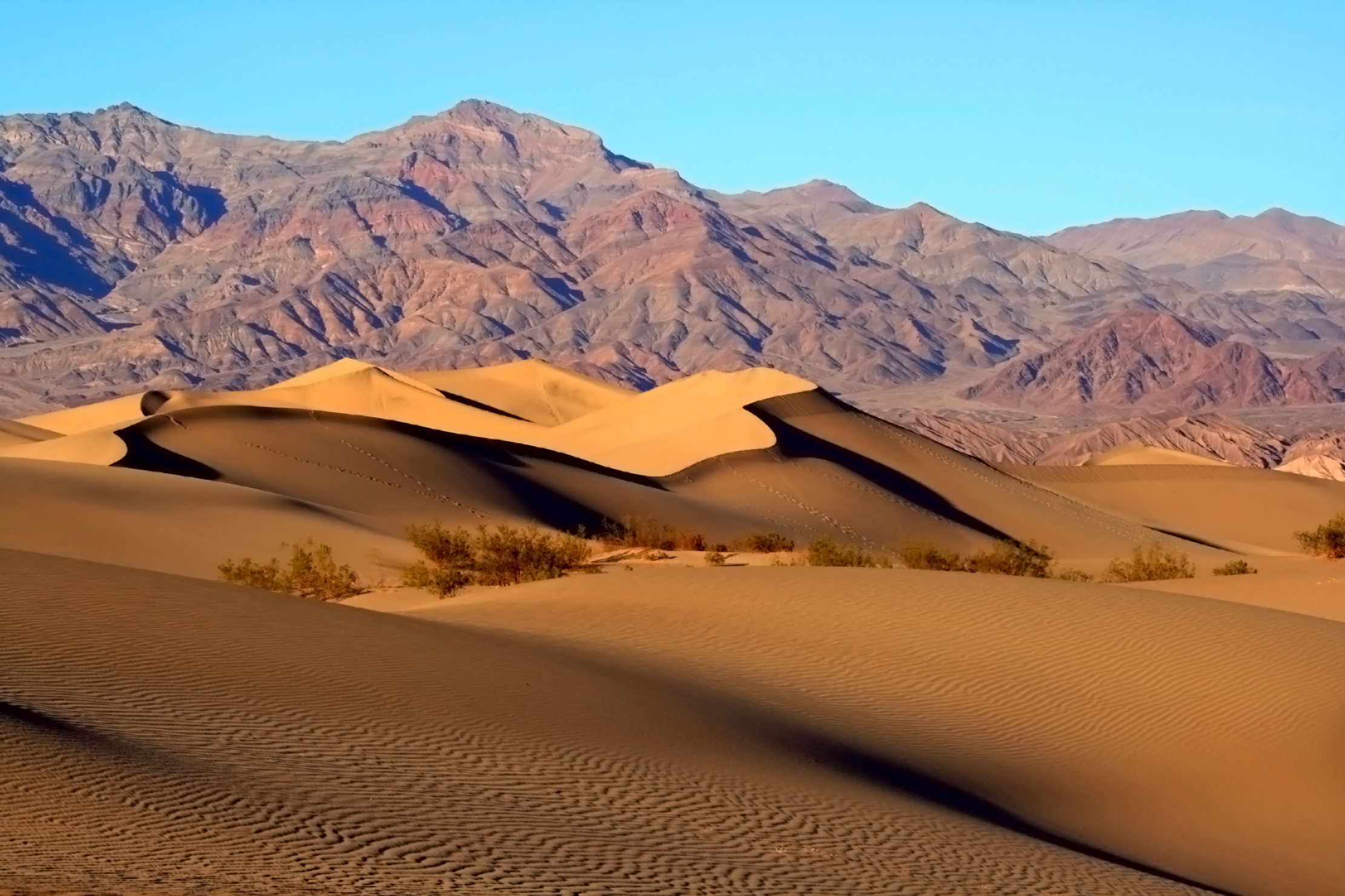
- Sand dunes in Death Valley National Park
- Interactive map of Death Valley National Park
- Location: California and Nevada, United States
- Nearest city: Lone Pine, California; Beatty, Nevada
- Coordinates: 36°27′N 116°51′W
- Area: 3,422,024 acres (13,848.44 km^{2})
- Established: February 11, 1933 as a national monument October 31, 1994 as a national park
- Visitors: 1,128,862 (in 2022)
- Governing body: National Park Service
- Website: www.nps.gov/deva/index.htm

Death Valley National Park is a national park of the United States that straddles the California–Nevada border, east of the Sierra Nevada. The park boundaries include Death Valley, the northern section of Panamint Valley, the southern section of Eureka Valley and most of Saline Valley.

The park occupies an interface zone between the arid Great Basin and Mojave deserts, protecting the northwest corner of the Mojave Desert and its diverse environment of salt-flats, sand dunes, badlands, valleys, canyons and mountains.

Death Valley is the largest national park in the contiguous United States, as well as the hottest, driest and lowest of all the national parks in the United States. It contains Badwater Basin, the second-lowest point in the Western Hemisphere and lowest in North America at 282 feet (86 m) below sea level. More than 93% of the park is a designated wilderness area.

The park is home to many species of plants and animals which have adapted to the harsh desert environment including creosote bush, Joshua tree, bighorn sheep, coyote, and the endangered Death Valley pupfish, a survivor from much wetter times. UNESCO included Death Valley as the principal feature of its Mojave and Colorado Deserts Biosphere Reserve in 1984.

A series of Native American groups inhabited the area from as early as 7000 BC, most recently the Timbisha around 1000 AD who migrated between winter camps in the valleys and summer grounds in the mountains. A group of European-Americans, lost in the valley in 1849 while looking for a shortcut to the gold fields of California, gave this valley its grim name, even though only one of their group died there.

Several short-lived boom towns sprang up during the late 19th and early 20th centuries to mine gold and silver. The only long-term profitable ore to be mined was borax, which was transported out of the valley with twenty-mule teams. The valley later became the subject of books, radio programs, television series, and movies. Tourism expanded in the 1920s when resorts were built around Stovepipe Wells and Furnace Creek. Death Valley National Monument was declared in 1933 and the park was substantially expanded and became a national park in 1994.

The natural environment of the area has been shaped largely by its geology. The valley is a graben with the oldest rocks being extensively metamorphosed and at least 1.7 billion years old. Ancient, warm, shallow seas deposited marine sediments until rifting opened the Pacific Ocean. Additional sedimentation occurred until a subduction zone formed off the coast. The subduction uplifted the region out of the sea and created a line of volcanoes. Later the crust started to pull apart, creating the current Basin and Range landform. Valleys filled with sediment and, during the wet times of glacial periods, with lakes, such as Lake Manly.

Death Valley is the fifth-largest American national park and the largest in the contiguous United States. It is also larger than the states of Rhode Island and Delaware combined, and nearly as large as Puerto Rico. In 2013, Death Valley National Park was designated as a dark sky park by the International Dark-Sky Association.

== Geographic setting ==
There are two major valleys in the park, Death Valley and Panamint Valley. Both of these valleys were formed within the last few million years and both are bounded by north–south-trending mountain ranges. These and adjacent valleys follow the general trend of Basin and Range topography with one modification: there are parallel strike-slip faults that perpendicularly bound the central extent of Death Valley. The result of this shearing action is additional extension in the central part of Death Valley which causes a slight widening and more subsidence there.

Uplift of surrounding mountain ranges and subsidence of the valley floor are both occurring. The uplift on the Black Mountains is so fast that the alluvial fans (fan-shaped deposits at the mouth of canyons) there are small and steep compared to the huge alluvial fans coming off the Panamint Range. Fast uplift of a mountain range in an arid environment often does not allow its canyons enough time to cut a classic V-shape all the way down to the stream bed. Instead, a V-shape ends at a slot canyon halfway down, forming a 'wine glass canyon'. Sediment is deposited on a small and steep alluvial fan.

At 282 feet (86 m) below sea level at its lowest point, Badwater Basin on Death Valley's floor is the second-lowest depression in the Western Hemisphere (behind Laguna del Carbón in Argentina), while Mount Whitney, only 85 miles (137 km) to the west, rises to 14,505 feet (4,421 m) and is the tallest mountain in the contiguous United States. This topographic relief is the greatest elevation gradient in the contiguous United States and is the terminus point of the Great Basin's southwestern drainage. Although the extreme lack of water in the Great Basin makes this distinction of little current practical use, it does mean that in wetter times the lake that once filled Death Valley (Lake Manly) was the last stop for water flowing in the region, meaning the water there was saturated in dissolved materials. Thus, the salt pans in Death Valley are among the largest in the world and are rich in minerals, such as borax and various salts and hydrates. The largest salt pan in the park extends 40 miles (64 km) from the Ashford Mill Site to the Salt Creek Hills, covering some 200 square miles (520 km^{2}) of the valley floor. (Note: Badwater, the Devils Golf Course, and Salt Creek are all part of the Death Valley Saltpan.) The best known playa in the park is the Racetrack, known for its moving rocks.

== Climate ==
A cross section through the highest and lowest points in Death Valley National Park

According to the Köppen climate classification system, Death Valley National Park has a hot desert climate (BWh). The plant hardiness zone at Badwater Basin is 9b with an average annual extreme minimum temperature of 28 °F (−2.2 °C).

Death Valley is the hottest and driest place in North America due to its lack of surface water and low relief. It is so frequently the hottest spot in the United States that many tabulations of the highest daily temperatures in the country omit Death Valley as a matter of course.

On the afternoon of July 10, 1913, the United States Weather Bureau recorded a high temperature of 134 °F (56.7 °C) at Greenland Ranch (now Furnace Creek) in Death Valley. This temperature stands as the highest ambient air temperature ever recorded at the surface of the Earth. (A report of a temperature of 136 °F (57.8 °C) recorded in Libya in 1922 was later determined to be inaccurate.) Daily summer temperatures of 120 °F (48.9 °C) or greater are common, as well as below freezing nighttime temperatures in the winter. July is the hottest month, with an average high of 117 °F (47.2 °C) and an average low of 91 °F (32.8 °C). December is the coldest month, with an average high of 66 °F (18.9 °C) and an average low of 41 °F (5 °C). The record low is 15 °F (−9.4 °C). There are an average of 197.3 days annually with highs of 90 °F (32.2 °C) or higher and 146.9 days annually with highs of 100 °F (37.8 °C) or higher. Freezing temperatures of 32 °F (0 °C) or lower occur on an average of 8.6 days annually.

Several of the larger Death Valley springs derive their water from a regional aquifer, which extends as far east as southern Nevada and Utah. Much of the water in this aquifer has been there for many thousands of years, since the Pleistocene ice ages, when the climate was cooler and wetter. Today's drier climate does not provide enough precipitation to recharge the aquifer at the rate at which water is being withdrawn.

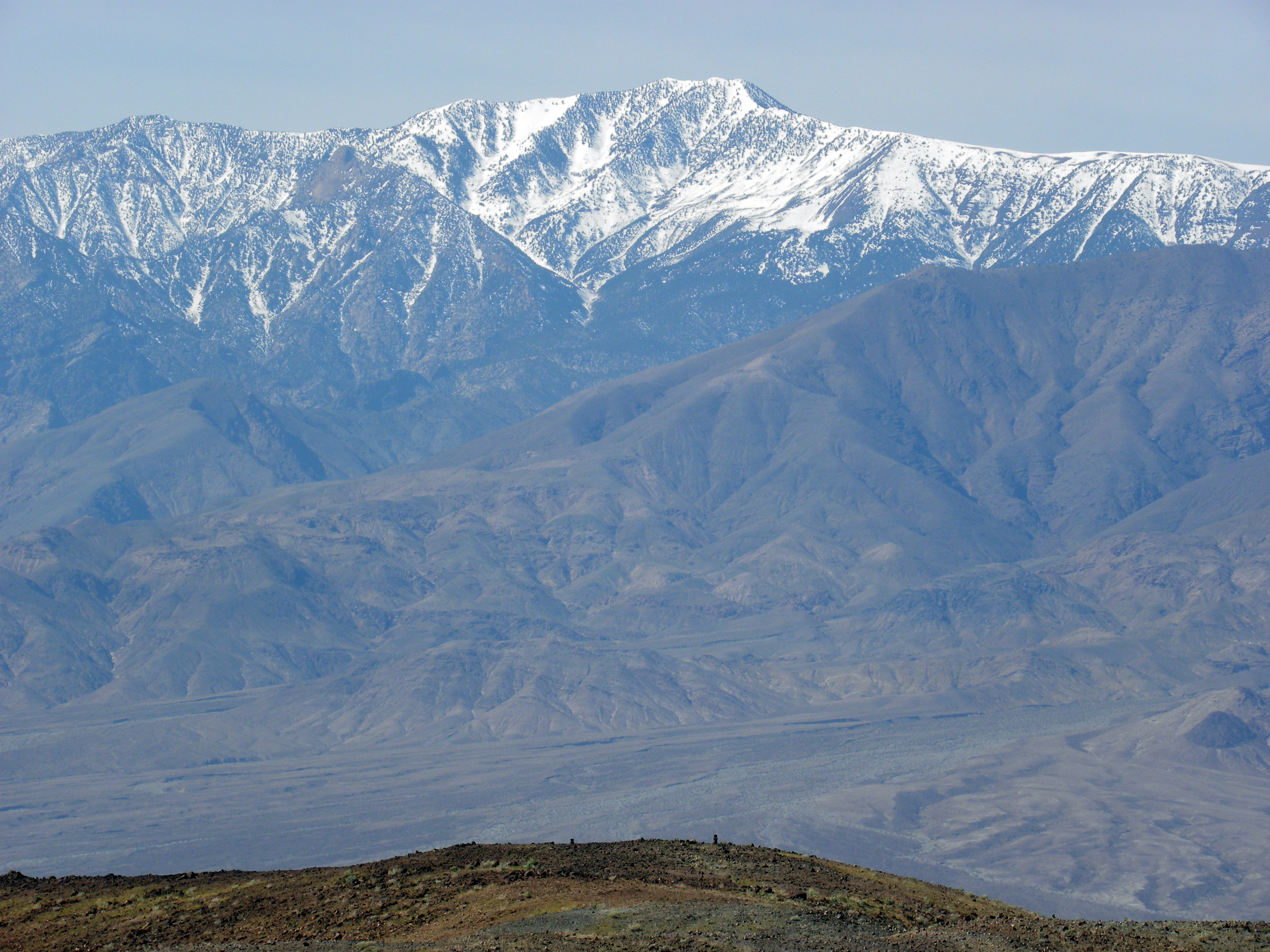
Telescope Peak

The highest range within the park is the Panamint Range, with Telescope Peak being its highest point at 11,049 feet (3,368 m). The Death Valley region is a transitional zone in the northernmost part of the Mojave Desert and consists of five mountain ranges removed from the Pacific Ocean. Three of these are significant barriers: the Sierra Nevada, the Argus Range, and the Panamint Range. Air masses tend to lose moisture as they are forced up over mountain ranges, in what climatologists call a rainshadow effect.

The exaggerated rain shadow effect for the Death Valley area makes it North America's driest spot, receiving about 1.5 inches (38.1 mm) of rainfall annually at Badwater, and some years fail to register any measurable rainfall. Annual average precipitation varies from 1.92 inches (48.8 mm) overall below sea level to over 15 inches (380 mm) in the higher mountains that surround the valley. When rain does arrive it often does so in intense storms that cause flash floods which remodel the landscape and sometimes create very shallow ephemeral lakes.

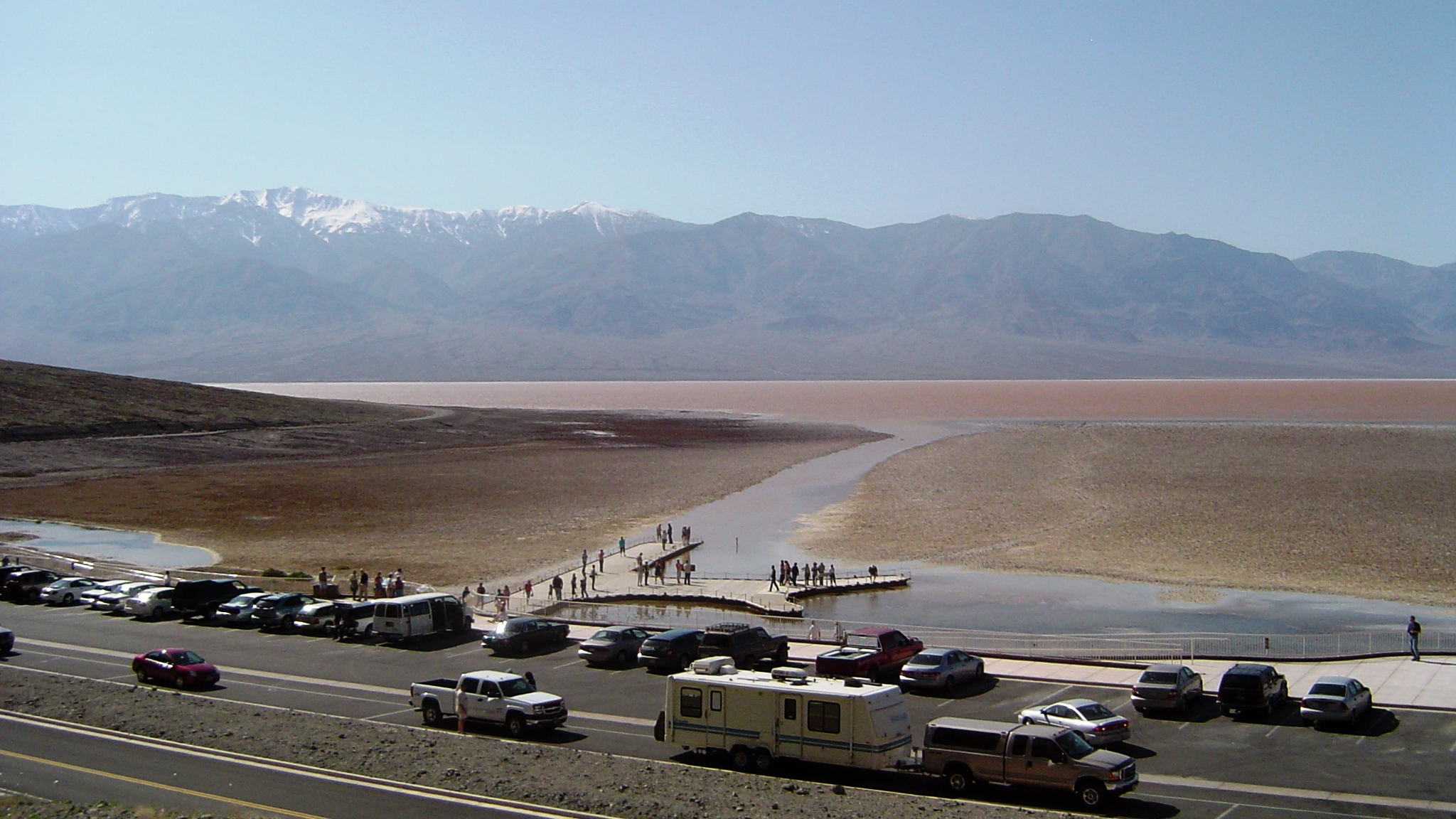
Lake Badwater, March 2005

The hot, dry climate makes it difficult for soil to form. Mass wasting, the down-slope movement of loose rock, is therefore the dominant erosive force in mountainous areas, resulting in "skeletonized" ranges (mountains with very little soil on them). Sand dunes in the park, while famous, are not nearly as widespread as their fame or the dryness of the area may suggest. The Mesquite Flat dune field is the most easily accessible from the paved road just east of Stovepipe Wells in the north-central part of the valley and is primarily made of quartz sand. Another dune field is just 10 miles (16 km) to the north but is instead mostly composed of travertine sand. The highest dunes in the park, and some of the highest in North America, are located in the Eureka Valley about 50 miles (80 km) to the north of Stovepipe Wells, while the Panamint Valley dunes and the Saline Valley dunes are located west and northwest of the town, respectively. The Ibex dune field is near the seldom-visited Ibex Hill in the southernmost part of the park, just south of the Saratoga Springs marshland. All the latter four dune fields are accessible only via unpaved roads. Prevailing winds in the winter come from the north, and prevailing winds in the summer come from the south. Thus, the overall position of the dune fields remains more or less fixed.

There are rare exceptions to the dry nature of the area. In 2005, an unusually wet winter created an ephemeral lake in the Badwater Basin and led to the greatest wildflower season in the park's history. In October 2015, a "1000 year flood event" with over three inches of rain caused major damage in Death Valley National Park. A similar widespread storm in August 2022 damaged pavement and deposited debris on nearly every road, trapping 1,000 residents and visitors overnight.

Death Valley National Park

Climate chart (precipitation, max. and min. temperature)
J	F	M	A	M	J	J	A	S	O	N	D
0.4 67 43	0.5 74 49	0.3 83 57	0.1 91 65	0 101 75	0.1 111 84	0.1 117 91	0.1 116 89	0.2 108 79	0.1 93 64	0.1 77 51	0.3 66 41
- █ Average max. and min. temperatures in °F
- █ Precipitation totals in inches
- Source: NOAA
Metric conversion
J	F	M	A	M	J	J	A	S	O	N	D
10 20 6	13 23 9	7.6 28 14	2.5 33 18	0 38 24	2.5 44 29	2.5 47 33	2.5 47 32	5.1 42 26	2.5 34 18	2.5 25 10	7.6 19 5
- █ Average max. and min. temperatures in °C
- █ Precipitation totals in mm

Climate data for Death Valley National Park, California, 1991–2020 normals, (Note: Mean maxima and minima (i.e. the highest and lowest temperature readings during an entire month or year) calculated based on data at said location from 1991 to 2020) extremes 1911–present
Month	Jan	Feb	Mar	Apr	May	Jun	Jul	Aug	Sep	Oct	Nov	Dec	Year
Record high °F (°C)	90 (32)	97 (36)	104 (40)	113 (45)	122 (50)	129 (54)	134 (57)	130 (54)	127 (53)	114 (46)	98 (37)	89 (32)	134 (57)
Mean maximum °F (°C)	78.4 (25.8)	85.1 (29.5)	95.4 (35.2)	106.0 (41.1)	113.6 (45.3)	122.0 (50.0)	125.9 (52.2)	123.4 (50.8)	118.1 (47.8)	106.2 (41.2)	90.0 (32.2)	77.8 (25.4)	126.7 (52.6)
Mean daily maximum °F (°C)	67.2 (19.6)	73.7 (23.2)	82.6 (28.1)	91.0 (32.8)	100.7 (38.2)	111.1 (43.9)	117.4 (47.4)	115.9 (46.6)	107.7 (42.1)	93.3 (34.1)	77.4 (25.2)	65.6 (18.7)	92.0 (33.3)
Daily mean °F (°C)	54.9 (12.7)	61.3 (16.3)	69.8 (21.0)	77.9 (25.5)	87.8 (31.0)	97.5 (36.4)	104.2 (40.1)	102.3 (39.1)	93.4 (34.1)	78.9 (26.1)	64.0 (17.8)	53.4 (11.9)	78.8 (26.0)
Mean daily minimum °F (°C)	42.5 (5.8)	49.0 (9.4)	57.1 (13.9)	64.8 (18.2)	75.0 (23.9)	84.0 (28.9)	91.0 (32.8)	88.7 (31.5)	79.1 (26.2)	64.4 (18.0)	50.5 (10.3)	41.1 (5.1)	65.6 (18.7)
Mean minimum °F (°C)	30.5 (−0.8)	36.1 (2.3)	42.8 (6.0)	49.8 (9.9)	58.5 (14.7)	67.9 (19.9)	78.3 (25.7)	75.3 (24.1)	65.4 (18.6)	49.5 (9.7)	35.9 (2.2)	29.0 (−1.7)	28.0 (−2.2)
Record low °F (°C)	15 (−9)	20 (−7)	26 (−3)	35 (2)	42 (6)	49 (9)	62 (17)	65 (18)	41 (5)	32 (0)	24 (−4)	19 (−7)	15 (−9)
Average precipitation inches (mm)	0.37 (9.4)	0.52 (13)	0.25 (6.4)	0.10 (2.5)	0.03 (0.76)	0.05 (1.3)	0.10 (2.5)	0.10 (2.5)	0.20 (5.1)	0.12 (3.0)	0.10 (2.5)	0.26 (6.6)	2.20 (56)
Average precipitation days (≥ 0.01 in)	2.4	2.9	2.0	1.1	0.9	0.3	1.1	0.9	0.8	1.1	0.9	1.6	16.0
Source: NOAA

Climate data for Death Valley (Cow Creek Station)
Month	Jan	Feb	Mar	Apr	May	Jun	Jul	Aug	Sep	Oct	Nov	Dec	Year
Record high °F (°C)	84 (29)	89 (32)	100 (38)	110 (43)	120 (49)	125 (52)	126 (52)	125 (52)	123 (51)	111 (44)	95 (35)	84 (29)	126 (52)
Mean daily maximum °F (°C)	64.4 (18.0)	71.6 (22.0)	80.6 (27.0)	90.9 (32.7)	100.0 (37.8)	109.3 (42.9)	116.0 (46.7)	113.8 (45.4)	106.9 (41.6)	92.1 (33.4)	75.4 (24.1)	65.9 (18.8)	90.6 (32.6)
Daily mean °F (°C)	52.5 (11.4)	59.1 (15.1)	67.4 (19.7)	77.5 (25.3)	86.4 (30.2)	95.3 (35.2)	102.1 (38.9)	99.9 (37.7)	92.1 (33.4)	78.1 (25.6)	62.3 (16.8)	54.1 (12.3)	77.2 (25.1)
Mean daily minimum °F (°C)	40.6 (4.8)	46.6 (8.1)	54.3 (12.4)	64.1 (17.8)	72.7 (22.6)	81.2 (27.3)	88.4 (31.3)	86.0 (30.0)	77.4 (25.2)	64.0 (17.8)	49.3 (9.6)	42.4 (5.8)	63.9 (17.7)
Record low °F (°C)	19 (−7)	30 (−1)	33 (1)	45 (7)	52 (11)	54 (12)	69 (21)	69 (21)	57 (14)	40 (4)	32 (0)	27 (−3)	19 (−7)
Average precipitation inches (mm)	0.24 (6.1)	0.32 (8.1)	0.20 (5.1)	0.20 (5.1)	0.10 (2.5)	0.02 (0.51)	0.10 (2.5)	0.11 (2.8)	0.12 (3.0)	0.11 (2.8)	0.20 (5.1)	0.29 (7.4)	2.00 (51)
Source: http://www.wrcc.dri.edu

== Human history ==
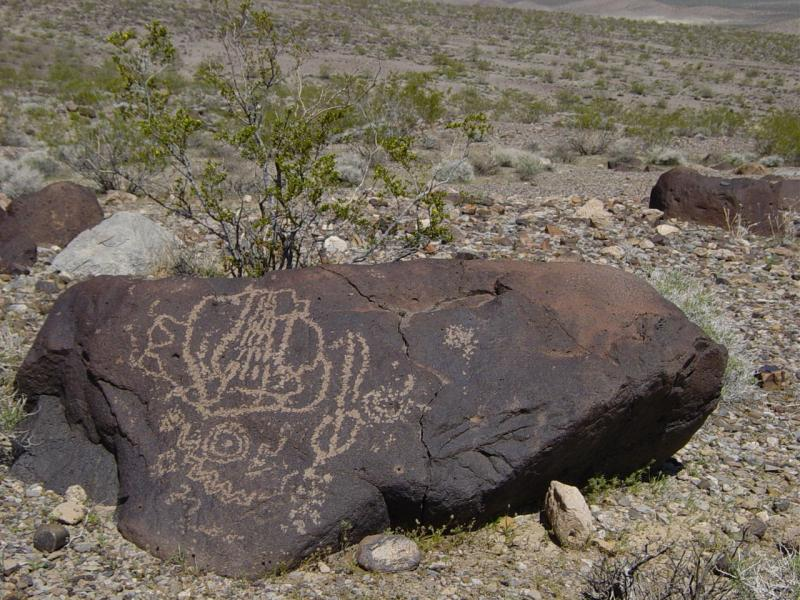
Petroglyphs above Mesquite Springs

=== Early inhabitants and transient populations ===
Four Native American cultures are known to have lived in the area during the last 10,000 years. The first known group, the Nevares Spring People, were hunters and gatherers who arrived in the area perhaps 9,000 years ago (7000 BC) when there were still small lakes in Death Valley and neighboring Panamint Valley. A much milder climate persisted at that time, and large game animals were still plentiful. By 5,000 years ago (3000 BC) the Mesquite Flat People displaced the Nevares Spring People. Around 2,000 years ago the Saratoga Spring People moved into the area, which by then was probably already a hot, dry desert. (Note: The last known lake to exist in Death Valley likely dried up 3,000 years ago.) This culture was more advanced at hunting and gathering and was skillful at handcrafts. They also left mysterious stone patterns in the valley.

One thousand years ago, the nomadic Timbisha (formerly called Shoshone and also known as Panamint or Koso) moved into the area and hunted game and gathered mesquite beans along with pinyon pine nuts. Because of the wide altitude differential between the valley bottom and the mountain ridges, especially on the west, the Timbisha practiced a vertical migration pattern. Their winter camps were located near water sources in the valley bottoms. As the spring and summer progressed and the weather warmed, grasses and other plant food sources ripened at progressively higher altitudes. November found them at the very top of the mountain ridges where they harvested pine nuts before moving back to the valley bottom for winter.

The California Gold Rush brought the first people of European descent known to visit the immediate area. In December 1849 two groups of California Gold Country-bound travelers with perhaps 100 wagons total stumbled into Death Valley after getting lost on what they thought was a shortcut off the Old Spanish Trail. Called the Bennett-Arcane Party, they were unable to find a pass out of the valley for weeks; they were able to find fresh water at various springs in the area, but were forced to eat several of their oxen to survive. They used the wood of their wagons to cook the meat and make jerky. The place where they did this is today referred to as "Burnt Wagons Camp" and is located near Stovepipe Wells.

After abandoning their wagons, they eventually were able to hike out of the valley. Just after leaving the valley, one of the women in the group turned and said, "Goodbye Death Valley", giving the valley its name. Included in the party was William Lewis Manly whose autobiographical book Death Valley in '49 detailed this trek and popularized the area (geologists later named the prehistoric lake that once filled the valley after him).

=== Boom and bust ===
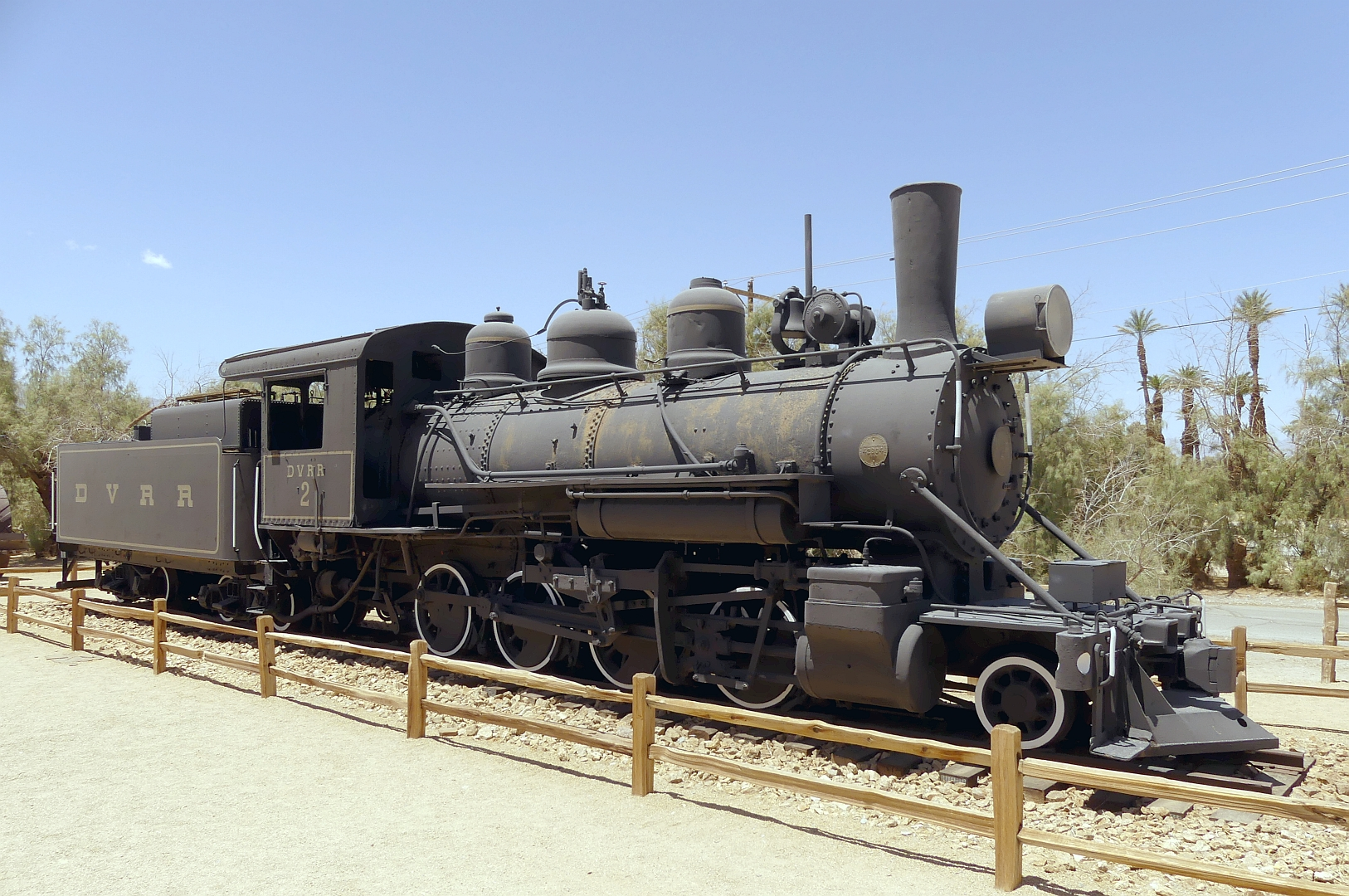
Historical locomotive for transporting borax in Death Valley

The ores that are most famously associated with the area were also the easiest to collect and the most profitable: evaporite deposits such as salts, borate, and talc. Borax was found by Rosie and Aaron Winters near The Ranch at Death Valley (then called Greenland) in 1881. Later that same year, the Eagle Borax Works became Death Valley's first commercial borax operation. William Tell Coleman built the Harmony Borax Works plant and began to process ore in late 1883 or early 1884, continuing until 1888. This mining and smelting company produced borax to make soap and for industrial uses. The end product was shipped out of the valley 165 miles (266 km) to the Mojave railhead in 10-ton-capacity wagons pulled by "twenty-mule teams" that were actually teams of 18 mules and two horses each.

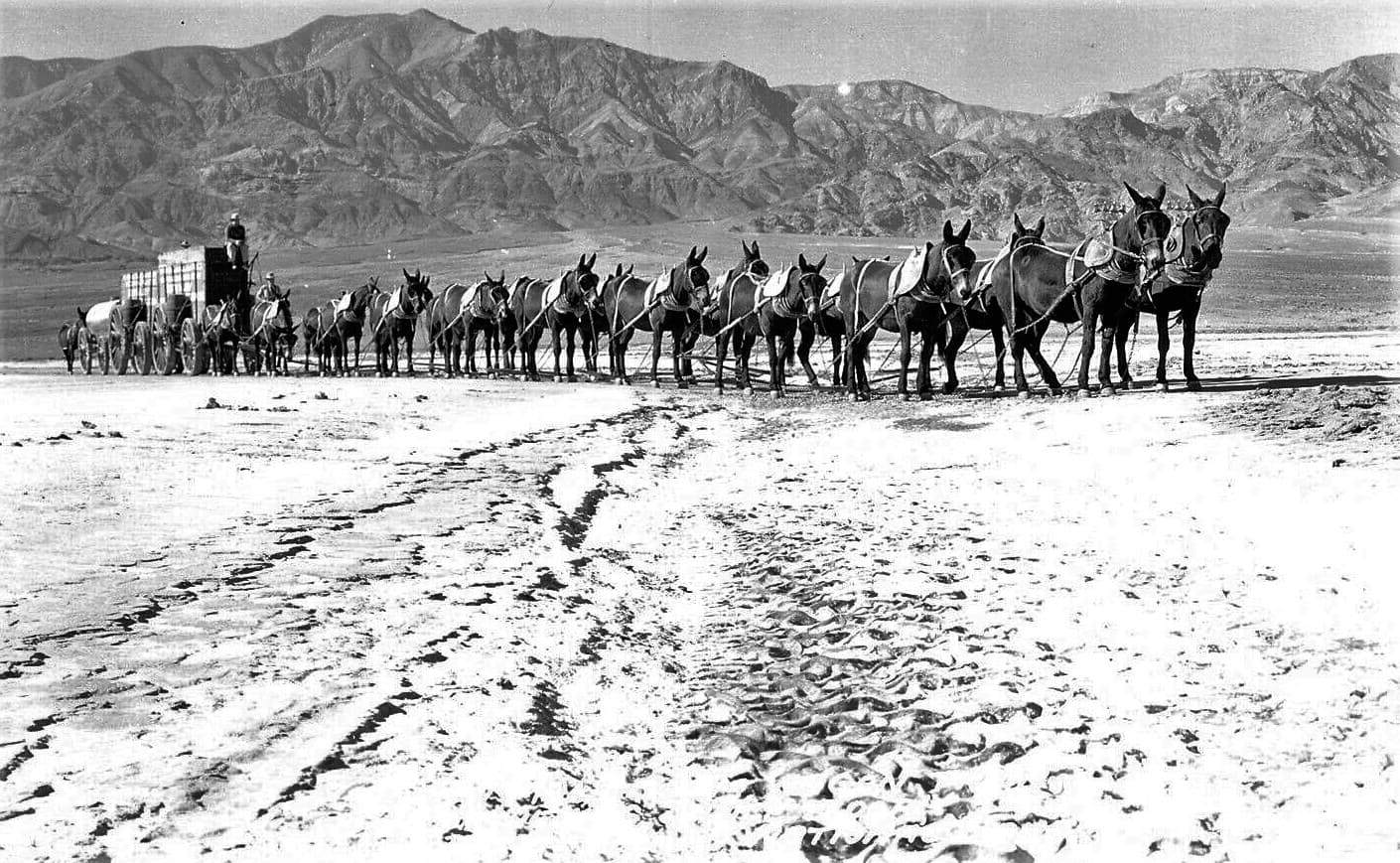
A twenty-mule team in Death Valley

The teams averaged two miles (3.2 km) an hour and required about 30 days to complete a round trip. The trade name 20-Mule Team Borax was established by Francis Marion Smith's Pacific Coast Borax Company after Smith acquired Coleman's borax holdings in 1890. A memorable advertising campaign used the wagon's image to promote the Boraxo brand of granular hand soap and the Death Valley Days radio and television programs. In 1914, the Death Valley Railroad was built to serve mining operations on the east side of the valley. Mining continued after the collapse of Coleman's empire, and by the late 1920s the area was the world's number one source of borax. Some four to six million years old, the Furnace Creek Formation is the primary source of borate minerals gathered from Death Valley's playas.

Other visitors stayed to prospect for and mine deposits of copper, gold, lead, and silver. These sporadic mining ventures were hampered by their remote location and the harsh desert environment. In December 1903, two men from Ballarat were prospecting for silver. One was an out-of-work Irish miner named Jack Keane and the other was a one-eyed Basque butcher named Domingo Etcharren. Quite by accident, Keane discovered an immense ledge of free-milling gold by the duo's work site and named the claim the Keane Wonder Mine. This started a minor and short-lived gold rush into the area. The Keane Wonder Mine, along with mines at Rhyolite, Skidoo and Harrisburg, were the only ones to extract enough metal ore to make them worthwhile. Outright shams such as Leadfield also occurred, but most ventures quickly ended after a short series of prospecting mines failed to yield evidence of significant ore (these mines now dot the entire area and are a significant hazard to anyone who enters them). The boom towns which sprang up around these mines flourished during the first decade of the 1900s, but soon declined after the Panic of 1907.

=== Early tourism ===
The first documented tourist facilities in Death Valley were a set of tent houses built in the 1920s where Stovepipe Wells is now located. People flocked to resorts built around natural springs thought to have curative and restorative properties. In 1927, Pacific Coast Borax turned the crew quarters of its Furnace Creek Ranch into a resort, creating the Furnace Creek Inn and resort. The spring at Furnace Creek was harnessed to develop the resort, and as the water was diverted, the surrounding marshes and wetlands started to shrink.

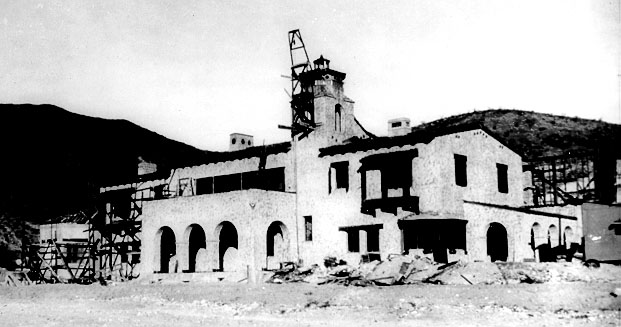
Scotty's Castle under construction

Soon the valley was a popular winter destination. Other facilities started off as private getaways but were later opened to the public. Most notable among these was Death Valley Ranch, better known as Scotty's Castle. This large ranch home built in the Spanish Revival style became a hotel in the late 1930s and, largely because of the fame of Death Valley Scotty, a tourist attraction. Death Valley Scotty, whose real name was Walter Scott, was a gold miner who pretended to be the owner of "his castle", which he claimed to have built with profits from his gold mine. Neither claim was true, but the real owner, Chicago millionaire Albert Mussey Johnson, encouraged the myth. When asked by reporters what his connection was to Walter Scott's castle, Johnson replied that he was Mr. Scott's banker.

=== Protection and later history ===
President Herbert Hoover proclaimed a national monument in and around Death Valley on February 11, 1933, setting aside almost two million acres (8,100 km^{2}) of southeastern California and small parts of Nevada.

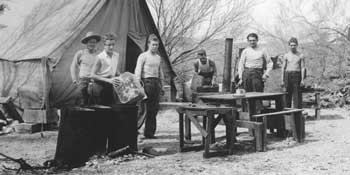
Civilian Conservation Corps workers in Death Valley

The Civilian Conservation Corps (CCC) developed infrastructure in Death Valley National Monument during the Great Depression and on into the early 1940s. The main CCC camp was located at Cow Creek, just north of the visitors center at Furnace Creek. The CCC built barracks, graded 500 miles (800 km) of roads, installed water and telephone lines, and a total of 76 buildings. Trails in the Panamint Range were built to points of scenic interest, and an adobe village, laundry and trading post were constructed for the Timbisha Shoshone Tribe. Five campgrounds, restrooms, an airplane landing field and picnic facilities were also built.

In 1942, the former CCC main camp at Cow Creek was repurposed for a short period to hold sixty-six Japanese American detainees who had been incarcerated at Manzanar.

The creation of the monument resulted in a temporary closing of the lands to prospecting and mining. However, Death Valley was quickly reopened to mining by Congressional action in June 1933. As improvements in mining technology allowed lower grades of ore to be processed, and new heavy equipment allowed greater amounts of rock to be moved, mining in Death Valley changed. Gone were the days of the "single-blanket, jackass prospector" long associated with the romantic west. Open pit and strip mines scarred the landscape as international mining corporations bought claims in highly visible areas of the national monument. The public outcry that ensued led to greater protection for all national park and monument areas in the United States. In 1976, Congress passed the Mining in the Parks Act, which closed Death Valley National Monument to the filing of new mining claims, banned open-pit mining and required the National Park Service to examine the validity of tens of thousands of pre-1976 mining claims. Mining was allowed to resume on a limited basis in 1980 with stricter environmental standards. The last mine in the park, Billie Mine, closed in 2005.

In 1952 President Harry Truman added the Devils Hole to Death Valley National Monument; it is the only habitat of the Devils Hole pupfish.

Death Valley National Monument was designated a biosphere reserve in 1984. On October 31, 1994, the monument was expanded by 1.3 million acres (5,300 km^{2}) and re-designated as a national park, via congressional passage of the California Desert Protection Act (Public Law 103–433). Consequently, the elevated status for Death Valley made it the largest national park in the contiguous United States. On March 12, 2019, the John D. Dingell Jr. Conservation, Management, and Recreation Act added 35,292 acres (55 sq mi; 143 km^{2}) to the park.

Many of the larger cities and towns within the boundary of the regional groundwater flow system that the park and its plants and animals rely upon are experiencing some of the fastest growth rates of any place in the United States. Notable examples within a 100-mile (160 km) radius of Death Valley National Park include Las Vegas and Pahrump, Nevada. In the case of Las Vegas, the local Chamber of Commerce estimates that 6,000 people are moving to the city every month. Between 1985 and 1995, the population of the Las Vegas Valley increased from 550,700 to 1,138,800.

In 1977, parts of Death Valley were used by director George Lucas as a filming location for Star Wars, providing the setting for the fictional planet Tatooine.

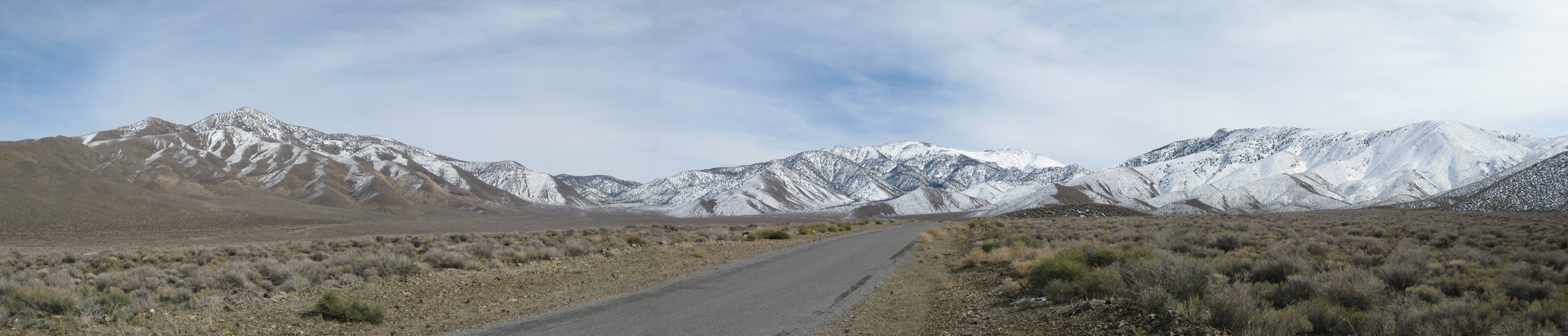
Telescope and Wildrose Peaks from Emigrant Canyon Road

== Geologic history ==
Era	Rock Units/Formations	Principal Geologic Events
Cenozoic	Alluvial fans, stream, and playa deposits, dunes, numerous sedimentary, volcanic, and plutonic units in separate and interconnected basins and igneous fields (includes Artist Drive, Furnace Creek, Funeral, and Nova Formations).	Major unconformity, continued deposition in modern Death Valley, opening of modern Death Valley, continuing development of present ranges and basins, onset of major extension.
Mesozoic	Granitic plutons, Butte Valley	Thrust faulting and intrusion of plutons related to Sierra Nevada batholith; shallow marine deposition; unconformity.
Paleozoic	Resting spring Shale, Tin Mountain Limestone, Lost Burro, Hidden Valley Dolomite, Eureka Quartzite, Nopah, Bonanza King, Carrara, Zabriskie Quartzite, Wood Canyon.	Development of a long-continuing carbonate bank on a passive continental margin; numerous intervals of emergence, interrupted by deposition of a blanket of sandstone in Middle Ordovician time. Deposition of a wedge of silliciclastic sediment during and immediately following the rifting along a new continental margin.
Proterozoic	Crystalline basement, Pahrump, Stirling Quartzite, Johnnie, Ibex, Noonday Dolomite, Kingston Peak, Beck Spring, Crystal Spring.	Regional metamorphism, Major unconformity, rapid uplift and erosion, shallow marine deposition, glacio-marine deposition, unconformity. Shallow to deep marine deposition along an incipient continental margin.

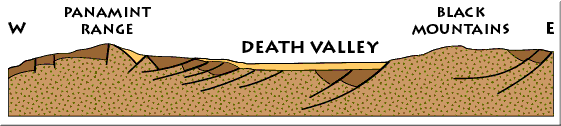
The Death Valley basin is filled with sediment (light yellow) eroded from the surrounding mountains. Black lines show some of the major faults that created the valley.

The park has a diverse and complex geologic history. Since its formation, the area that comprises the park has experienced at least four major periods of extensive volcanism, three or four periods of major sedimentation, and several intervals of major tectonic deformation where the crust has been reshaped. Two periods of glaciation (a series of ice ages) have also had effects on the area, although no glaciers ever existed in the ranges now in the park.

=== Basement and Pahrump Group ===
Little is known about the history of the oldest exposed rocks in the area due to extensive metamorphism (alteration of rock by heat and pressure). Radiometric dating gives an age of 1,700 million years for the metamorphism during the Proterozoic. About 1,400 million years ago a mass of granite now in the Panamint Range intruded this complex. Uplift later exposed these rocks to nearly 500 million years of erosion.

The Proterozoic sedimentary formations of the Pahrump Group were deposited on these basement rocks. This occurred following uplift and erosion of any earlier sediments from the Proterozoic basement rocks. The Pahrump is composed of arkose conglomerate (quartz clasts in a concrete-like matrix) and mudstone in its lower part, followed by dolomite from carbonate banks topped by algal mats as stromatolites, and finished with basin-filling sediment derived from the above, including possible glacial till from the hypothesized Snowball Earth glaciation. The very youngest rocks in the Pahrump Group are basaltic lava flows.

=== Rifting and deposition ===
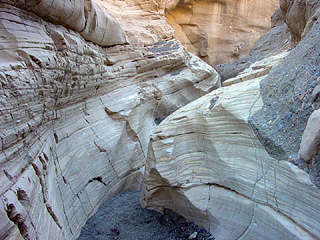
The Noonday Dolomite was formed as a carbonate shelf after the break-up of Rodinia.

A rift opened and subsequently flooded the region as part of the breakup of the supercontinent Rodinia in the Neoproterozoic (by about 755 million years ago) and the creation of the Pacific Ocean. A shoreline similar to the present Atlantic Ocean margin of the United States lay to the east. An algal mat-covered carbonate bank was deposited, forming the Noonday Dolomite. Subsidence of the region occurred as the continental crust thinned and the newly formed Pacific widened, forming the Ibex Formation. An angular unconformity (an uneven gap in the geologic record) followed.

A true ocean basin developed to the west, breaking all the earlier formations along a steep front. A wedge of clastic sediment then began to accumulate at the base of the two underwater precipices, starting the formation of opposing continental shelves. Three formations developed from sediment that accumulated on the wedge. The region's first known fossils of complex life are found in the resulting formations. Notable among these are the Ediacara fauna and trilobites, the evolution of the latter being part of the Cambrian Explosion of life.

The sandy mudflats gave way about 550 million years ago to a carbonate platform (similar to the one around the present-day Bahamas), which lasted for the next 300 million years of Paleozoic time (refer to the middle of the timescale image). Death Valley's position was then within ten or twenty degrees of the Paleozoic equator. Thick beds of carbonate-rich sediments were periodically interrupted by periods of emergence. Although details of geography varied during this immense interval of time, a north-northeastern coastline trend generally ran from Arizona up through Utah. The resulting eight formations and one group are 20,000 feet (6 km) thick and underlay much of the Cottonwood, Funeral, Grapevine, and Panamint ranges.

=== Compression and uplift ===
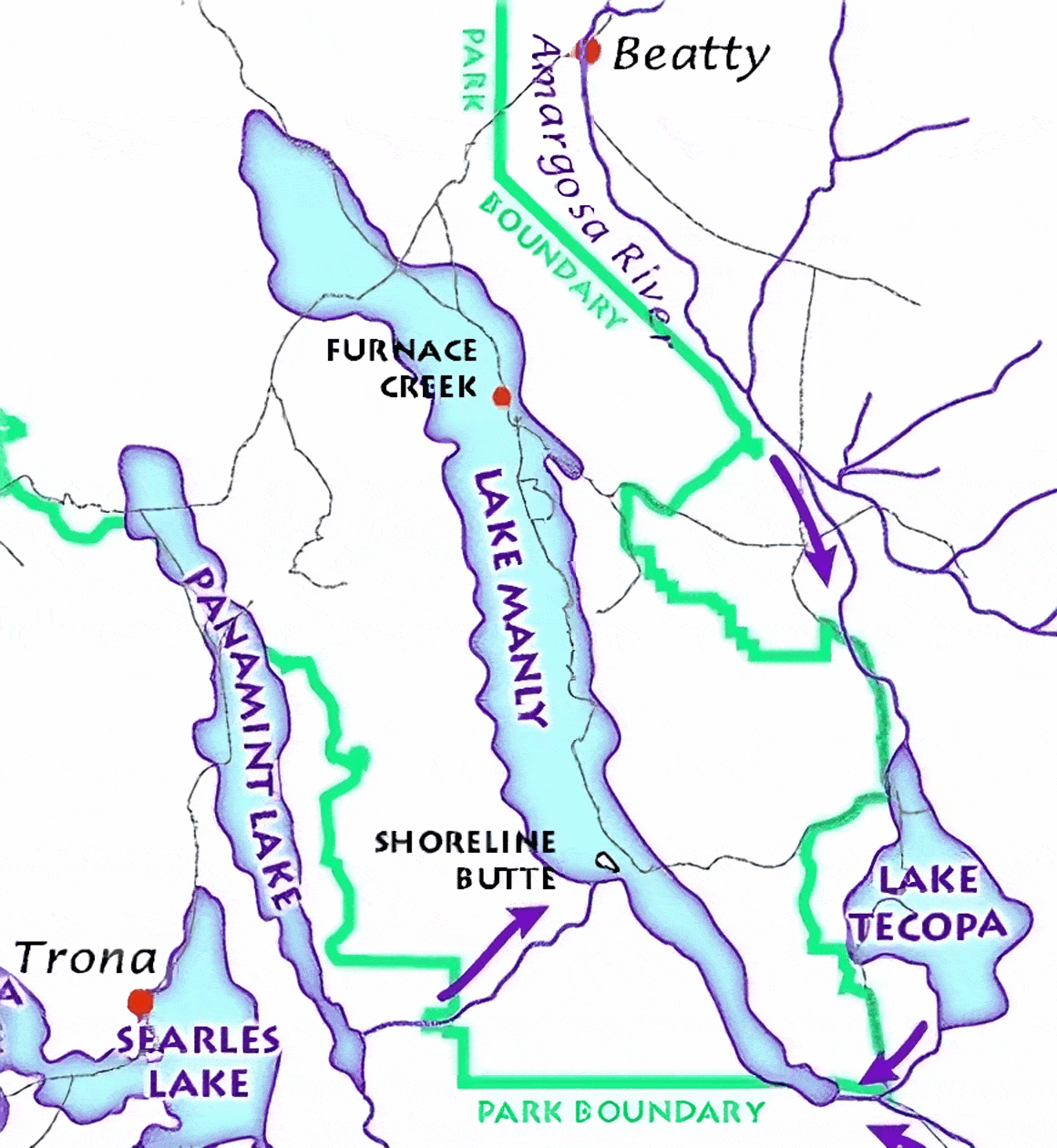
The Lake Manly lake system as it might have looked during its last maximum extent 22,000 years ago (USGS image)

In the early-to-mid- Mesozoic the western edge of the North American continent was pushed against the oceanic plate under the Pacific Ocean, creating a subduction zone. A subduction zone is a type of contact between different crustal plates where heavier crust slides below lighter crust. Erupting volcanoes and uplifting mountains were created as a result, and the coastline was pushed to the west. The Sierran Arc started to form to the northwest from heat and pressure generated from subduction, and compressive forces caused thrust faults to develop.

A long period of uplift and erosion was concurrent with and followed the above events, creating a major unconformity, which is a large gap in the geologic record. Sediments worn off the Death Valley region were carried both east and west by wind and water. No Jurassic- to Eocene-aged sedimentary formations exist in the area, except for some possibly Jurassic-age volcanic rocks (see the top of the timescale image).

=== Stretching and lakes ===
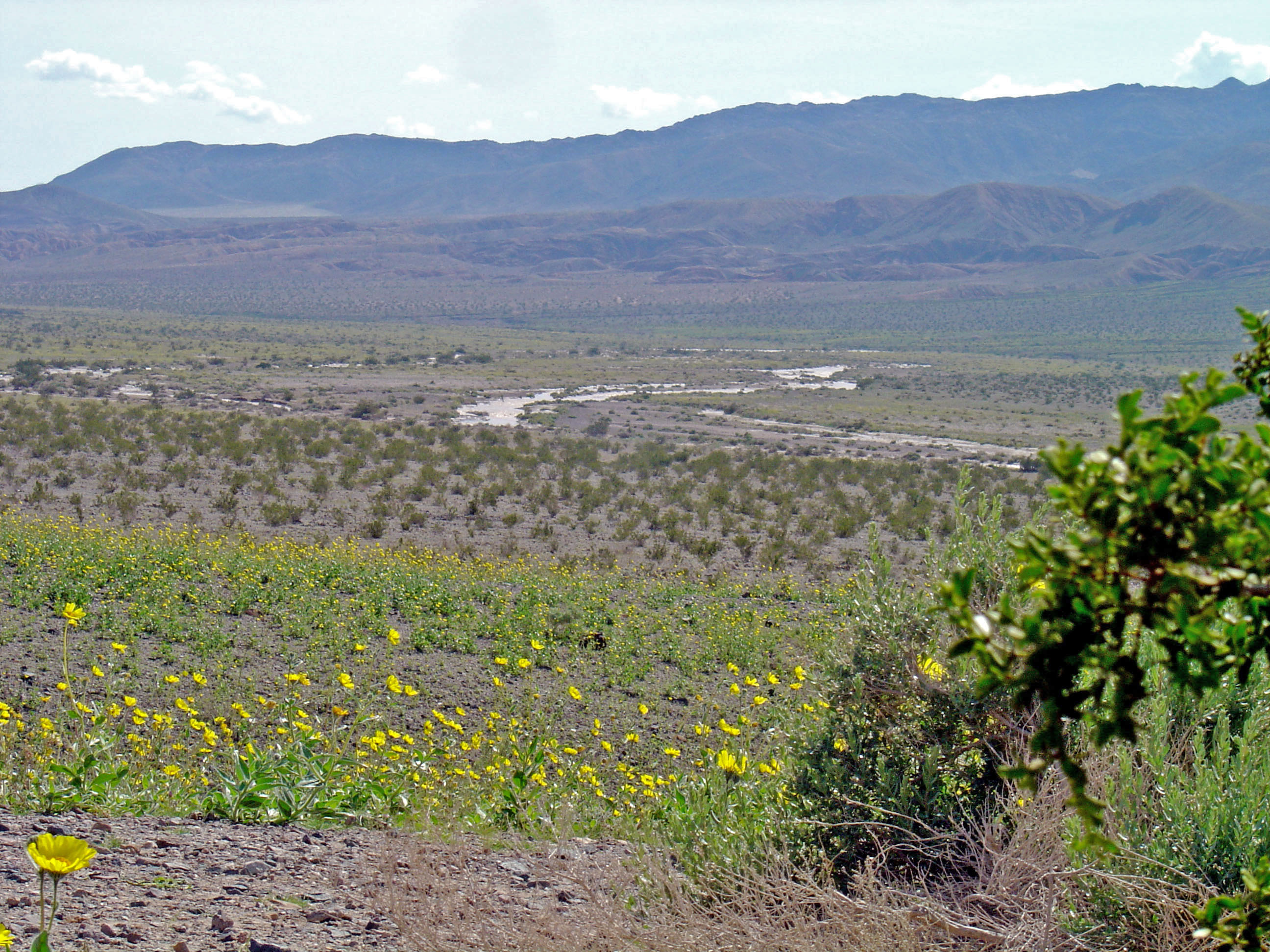
During very wet periods, the Amargosa River can flow at the surface, as it did in February 2005.

Basin and Range-associated stretching of large parts of crust below southwestern United States and northwestern Mexico started around 16 million years ago and the region is still spreading. This stretching began to affect the Death and Panamint valleys area by 3 million years ago. Before this, rocks now in the Panamint Range were on top of rocks that would become the Black Mountains and the Cottonwood Mountains. Lateral and vertical transport of these blocks was accomplished by movement on normal faults. Right-lateral movement along strike-slip faults that run parallel to and at the base of the ranges also helped to develop the area. Torsional forces, probably associated with northwesterly movement of the Pacific plate along the San Andreas Fault (west of the region), is responsible for the lateral movement.

Igneous activity associated with this stretching occurred from 12 million to 4 million years ago. Sedimentation is concentrated in valleys (basins) from material eroded from adjacent ranges. The amount of sediment deposited has roughly kept up with this subsidence, resulting in the retention of more or less the same valley floor elevation over time.

Pleistocene ice ages started 2 million years ago, and melt from alpine glaciers on the nearby Sierra Nevada Mountains fed a series of lakes that filled Death and Panamint valleys and surrounding basins (see the top of the timescale image). The lake that filled Death Valley was the last of a chain of lakes fed by the Amargosa and Mojave Rivers, and possibly also the Owens River. The large lake that covered much of Death Valley's floor, which geologists call Lake Manly, started to dry up 10,500 years ago. Salt pans and playas were created as ice age glaciers retreated, thus drastically reducing the lakes' water source. Only faint shorelines are left.

== Biology ==
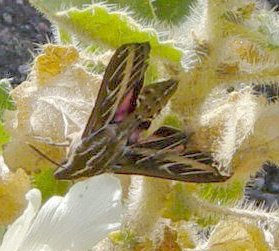
Sphinx moth on a rock nettle in Mosaic Canyon

Habitat varies from salt pan at 282 feet (86 m) below sea level to the sub-alpine conditions found on the summit of Telescope Peak, which rises to 11,049 feet (3,368 m). Vegetation zones include creosote bush, desert holly, and mesquite at the lower elevations and sage up through shadscale, blackbrush, Joshua tree, pinyon-juniper, to limber pine and bristlecone pine woodlands. The salt pan is devoid of vegetation, and the rest of the valley floor and lower slopes have sparse cover, although where water is available, an abundance of vegetation is usually present. These zones and the adjacent desert support a variety of wildlife species, including 51 species of native mammals, 307 species of birds, 36 species of reptiles, 3 species of amphibians, and 2 species of native fish.

Small mammals are more numerous than large mammals, such as bighorn sheep, coyotes, bobcats, kit foxes, cougars, and mule deer. Mule deer are present in the pinyon/juniper associations of the Grapevine, Cottonwood, and Panamint ranges. Bighorn sheep are a rare species of mountain-dwelling sheep that exist in isolated bands in the Sierra and in Death Valley. These are highly adaptable animals and can eat almost any plant. They have no known predators, but humans and burros compete for habitat.

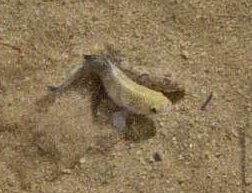
Death Valley pupfish spawning in Salt Creek

The ancestors of the Death Valley pupfish swam to the area from the Colorado River via a long-since dried-up system of rivers and lakes (see Lake Manly). They now live in two separate populations: one in Salt Creek and another in Cottonball Marsh. Death Valley is one of the hottest and driest places in North America, yet it is home to over 1,000 species of plants; 23 of which, including the very rare rock lady (Holmgrenanthe), are not found anywhere else.

Adaptation to the dry environment is key. For example, creosote bush and mesquite have tap-root systems that can extend 50 feet (15 m) down in order to take advantage of a year-round supply of ground water. The diversity of Death Valley's plant communities results partly from the region's location in a transition zone between the Mojave Desert, the Great Basin Desert and the Sonoran Desert. This location, combined with the great relief found within the park, supports vegetation typical of three biotic life zones: the lower Sonoran, the Canadian, and the arctic/alpine in portions of the Panamint Range. Based on the Munz and Keck (1968) classifications, seven plant communities can be categorized within these life zones, each characterized by dominant vegetation and representative of three vegetation types: scrub, desert woodland, and coniferous forest. Microhabitats further subdivide some communities into zones, especially on the valley floor.

Unlike more typical locations across the Mojave Desert, many of the water-dependent Death Valley habitats possess a diversity of plant and animal species that are not found anywhere else in the world. The existence of these species is due largely to a unique geologic history and the process of evolution that has progressed in habitats that have been isolated from one another since the Pleistocene epoch.

== Activities ==
Sightseeing is available by personal automobile, four-wheel drive, motorcycle, bicycle, mountain bike (on established roadways only), and hiking. State Route 190, the Badwater Road, the Scotty's Castle Road, and paved roads to Dante's View and Wildrose provide access to the major scenic viewpoints and historic points of interest. More than 350 miles (560 km) of unpaved and four-wheel-drive roads provide access to wilderness hiking, camping, and historical sites. Unlike many other national parks in the U.S. there are no formal entrance stations, and instead entry fees can be paid at the visitor centers, ranger stations, or various fee machines around the park. There are hiking trails of varying lengths and difficulties, but most backcountry areas are accessible only by cross-country hiking. The peak season for visiting the park is from October to May, avoiding summer extreme temperatures. Costumed living history tours of the historic Scotty's Castle were suspended in October 2015 due to extensive flood damage to the buildings and grounds. It remains closed to the public.

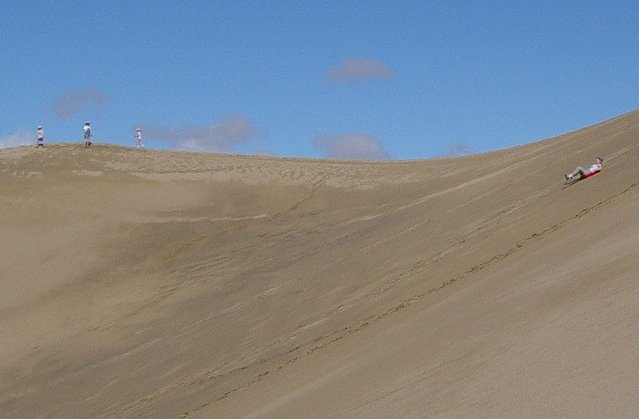
A tourist sliding down Star Dune in the Mesquite Flat dune field

There are nine designated campgrounds within the park, and overnight backcountry camping permits are available at the visitor center. Xanterra Parks & Resorts owns and operates a private resort, the Oasis at Death Valley, which comprises two separate and distinct hotels: the Inn at Death Valley is a four-star historic hotel, and the Ranch at Death Valley is a three-star ranch-style property reminiscent of the mining and prospecting days. Panamint Springs Resort is in the western part of the park. Death Valley Lodging Company operates the Stovepipe Wells Resort under a concession permit. There are a few motels near entrances to the park, in Shoshone, Death Valley Junction, Beatty, and Pahrump.

Furnace Creek Visitor Center is located on CA-190 and includes exhibits and a film about the park's geology, climate, wildlife and natural history, as well as human history and pioneer experience. During the winter season—November through April—rangers offer interpretive tours and a variety of walks, talks, and presentations about Death Valley cultural and natural history. The Death Valley Natural History Association maintains a bookstore.

The northeast corner of Saline Valley has several developed hot spring pools accessible by several hours' drive on unpaved roads or by flying a personal aircraft to the Chicken Strip—an uncharted airstrip a short walk from the springs.

Death Valley National Park is a popular location for stargazing as it has one of the darkest night skies in the United States. Despite its remote location, air quality and night visibility are threatened by civilization. In particular, light pollution is introduced by nearby Las Vegas. The darkest skies are located in the northwest of the park; Ubehebe Crater is a Bortle class 1 or "excellent dark sky" site. The Andromeda Galaxy and the Triangulum Galaxy are visible to the unaided eye under these conditions, and the Milky Way casts shadows; optical phenomena such as zodiacal light or "false dawn" and gegenschein are also visible to the unaided eye under these conditions. Most southern regions of the park are Bortle class 2 or "average dark sky" sites.

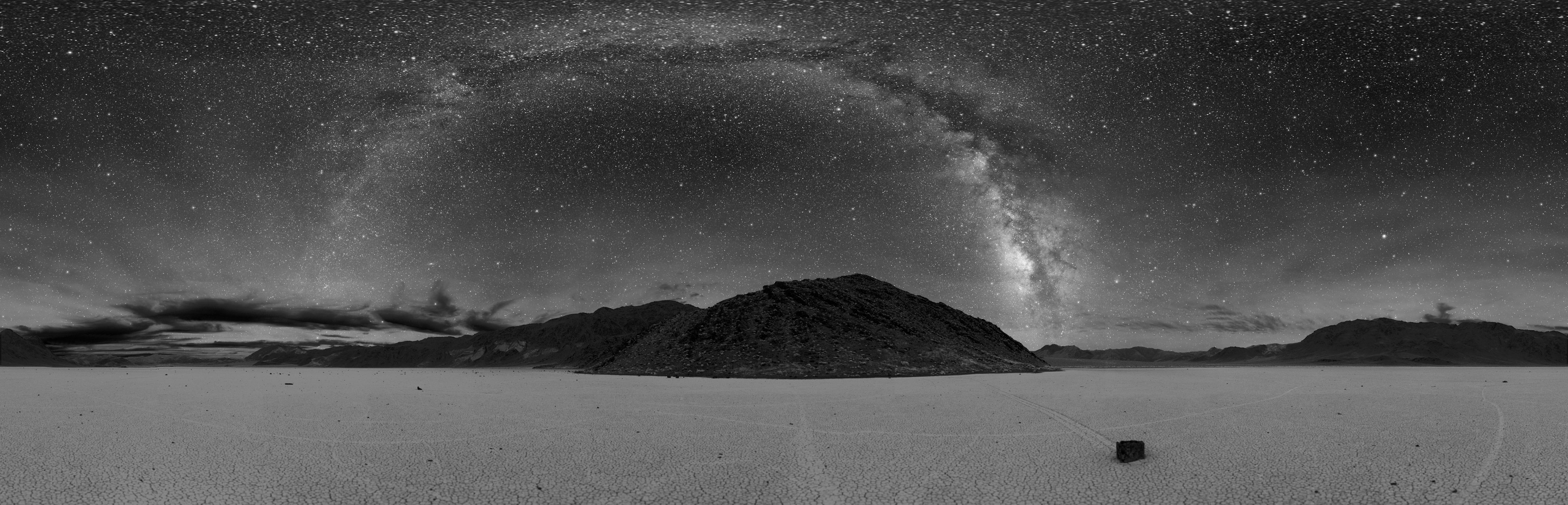
A 360-degree panorama of Racetrack Playa at night. The Milky Way is visible as an arc in the center.

== See also ==
- Harry Wade Exit Route, California Historic Landmark
- List of national parks of the United States
- List of nationally protected areas of the United States
- National parks in California
- National Register of Historic Places listings in Death Valley National Park
