= Albert Mussey Johnson =

Albert Mussey Johnson (May 31, 1872 – January 7, 1948), was a millionaire who served for many years as president of the National Life Insurance Company, built Scotty's Castle in Death Valley, and was variously partner, friend, and dupe of infamous Wild West con man Death Valley Scotty, for whose outrageous antics he later served as financier.

== Early years ==
Albert Johnson was born into a prominent family in Oberlin, Ohio. He was the son of Albert Harrison Johnson (1838–1899) and his wife Rebecca A. Jenkins (1842–1915). Johnson's father was an extremely wealthy man who owned several banks, a utility company, and a few stone quarries in the vicinity of Oberlin. He was also President of the Arkansas Midland Railroad Company, which was based in Helena, Arkansas.

Although records of Albert M. Johnson's early life are frequently contradictory and uncertain, it is known that he was given a very religious upbringing. It has been asserted numerous times that Johnson was raised a Quaker, but some sources indicate that due to the close affiliation between Johnson's grandparents and John Shipherd, Presbyterian minister and founder of Oberlin College it is far more likely Johnson's family was Presbyterian or Congregationalist. Either way, however, Johnson lived a devout lifestyle and was a lifelong non-smoker and teetotaler.

Johnson attended Oberlin College for one year before transferring to Cornell University in Ithaca, New York. While a student in the civil engineering program at Cornell, Albert met and fell in love with Bessie Penniman, a fellow student at Cornell, and the daughter of a wealthy fruit and nut rancher from Walnut Creek, California. Albert Johnson graduated from Cornell in 1895, and a year later married Bessie.

Not long after his marriage to Bessie, Johnson borrowed $40,000 from his father to invest in a lead-zinc mine in Missouri, which turned out to be an extremely profitable investment. Flush with cash and success, Johnson prevailed upon his father to travel with him out to the Wild West to inspect more mining claims for possible further investment. The trip was ill-fated, however, and in December, 1899, while riding on a train on the Denver and Rio Grande line near Salida, Colorado, Albert Johnson and his father were victims of a terrible train accident. The Johnsons' train was struck from the rear by another train, and Albert Johnson's father was killed as he slept. Albert Johnson himself suffered from a broken back, for which he was given an initial prognosis of certain and imminent death, as well as lifelong paralysis below the waist.

Albert Johnson made a near-miraculous recovery, regaining his ability to walk within eighteen months, and living for well over forty years past the accident. He never quite returned to full health, however, and walked with a limp for the rest of his life, which he took great pains to disguise.

In 1902, after his recovery, Johnson moved to Chicago, Illinois, to join his father's former business partner, Edward A. Shedd, in taking over some of his father's business interests as well as establishing new ones of his own. Shedd and Johnson jointly purchased the National Life Insurance Company at a foreclosure sale. Through a bargain with Shedd, Albert Johnson acquired 90% of publicly available National Life stock, and quickly became President of the company. Johnson's annual salary as President of National Life Insurance was said to have been approximately $1,000,000.

== Johnson and Death Valley Scotty ==
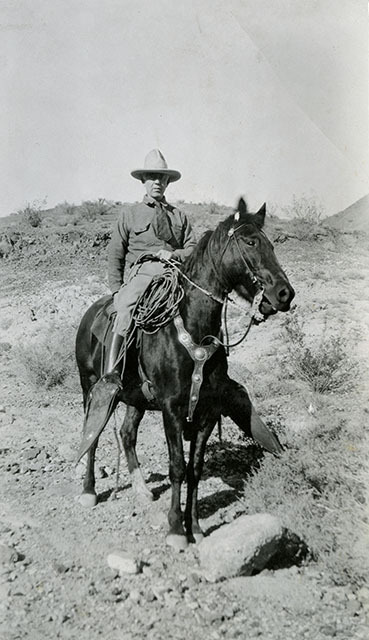
Johnson in Death Valley, 1928

Albert Johnson and Edward Shedd were approached in 1904 by Obadiah Sands, who was acting as an intermediary for Walter E. Scott, also known as Death Valley Scotty, a man notorious for his story of having discovered a mysterious gold mine in Death Valley. Scotty was often soliciting wealthy investors to grubstake his supposed mining operation, and Johnson and Shedd were no exceptions. For an initial investment of $2,500, Scotty offered the pair a two-thirds interest in any mines he discovered in Death Valley. Scotty then offered Obadiah Sands a 20% interest in the mine as a reward for having acted as an intermediary. Johnson and Shedd split their two-thirds interest evenly between them.

By 1906, Johnson and Shedd had begun to notice the distinct lack of a return on their investment. Johnson banded together with a few more of Scotty's investors and purchased train tickets out to Death Valley so they could inspect Scotty's findings themselves. Scotty and his brother Warner collected his visitors and brought them out to a wash in Death Valley where some of Scotty's friends had hidden themselves, disguised as bandits to scare off the investors before they discovered that Scotty's mine was fictitious. In the ensuing mock gunfight, popularly known as "The Battle of Wingate Pass", Warner was shot and badly injured, prompting Scotty to call the whole thing off in order to go to Warner's assistance. By the time the shooting stopped, most of Scotty's investors realized they'd been fooled and pulled out of Scotty's scheme. Johnson, however, felt that there might still be a chance that Scotty had found gold and decided to pursue the matter further.

After returning home to Chicago, Johnson hired Alfred MacArthur, who worked as a General Agent of the National Life Insurance Company, to go out to Death Valley and follow Scotty day and night until he discovered whether or not Scotty had a mine. Scotty tried to fool his pursuer by planting gold ore in an exhausted mine shaft, but MacArthur was not convinced. MacArthur sent a telegram to Albert Johnson to inform him of Scotty's dishonesty, and thus exploded the myth of a gold mine.

In spite of this and other independent confirmations that Scotty's mining scheme had no substance to it, Johnson persisted in his belief that Scotty really had found gold in Death Valley. Beginning in 1909, Johnson made many trips out to Death Valley to visit Scotty in the hopes of finally being shown the gold mine he had been promised. Although it is almost certain that Johnson realized after a few years that the gold mine did not exist after all, he continued his trips to visit Scotty, as he had learned to enjoy Death Valley as well as Scotty's company.

== Later years ==
In 1915, Johnson purchased a ranch at Grapevine Canyon in what is now Death Valley National Park from a man named Jacob Steininger, and in 1916 began building the first of many structures he constructed on the property, a small shack that he and Death Valley Scotty used for camping. After Albert Johnson spent several winters of desert vacations with Scotty, Bessie began to grow curious about Death Valley and its attraction her husband had for it.

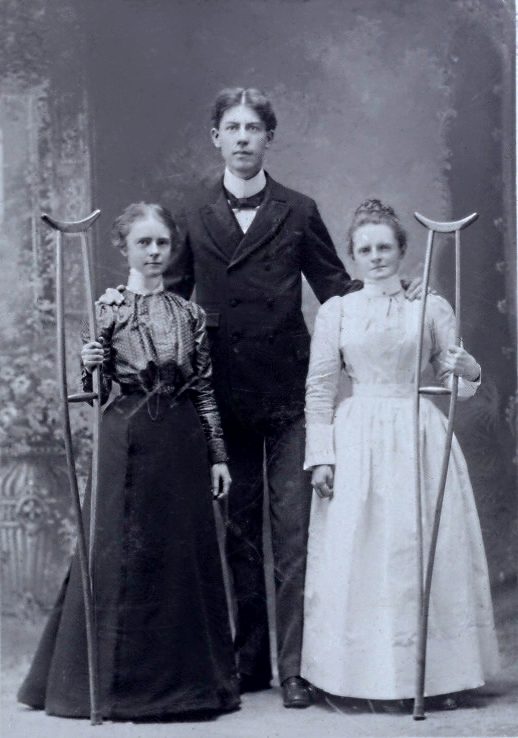
Albert Johnson is flanked by his wife Bessie (left) and a nurse, who hold the crutches he required during his recovery from the train accident.

Bessie began to accompany Albert, but after a year or two decided that though she also found Death Valley appealing, she was not content to sleep on the ground in a dirty tent or shack. In 1922, to mollify his wife, Albert Johnson began constructing what was eventually to become Scotty's Castle. In 1927 Johnson purchased more land in Grapevine Canyon from Fred M. Sayre and his wife Vida L. Sayre, and also from Beveridge Hunter and his wife Ruth, bringing the total size of his Death Valley Ranch to approximately 1,500 acres (610 ha).

== Johnson's health ==
In spite of his speedy and remarkable recovery from the spinal injury he received in the train accident in 1899, Albert Johnson continued to feel the effects of his injury for the rest of his life. Although he regained the ability to walk, he suffered from partial paralysis below the waist, specifically paralysis of the excretory organs. His paralysis was such that Johnson was forced to catheterize himself multiple times every day to assist in his ability to urinate, and keep meticulous records of his daily fluid intake and output in order to monitor his own health.

There is also some speculation that Johnson was also forced to carry a colostomy bag with him for the rest of his life, based on the observations of a few of his friends that Johnson frequently wore clothing that was too baggy for him, possibly to disguise certain side effects of his injuries.

== Television depiction ==
Johnson was portrayed by actor William Schallert in the 1955 episode, "Death Valley Scotty," on the syndicated television anthology series Death Valley Days, hosted by Stanley Andrews. Johnson was the benefactor of Walter E. Scott, played by Jack Lomas (1911-1959). In 1905, Scott commissioned the "Scott Special," a passenger train of the Atchison, Topeka and Santa Fe Railway. The steam locomotive Santa Fe No. 1010 was used to re-create the record-setting 44-hour railroad run from Los Angeles to Chicago. It was especially reconditioned for filming.

== Sources ==
- Albert Johnson vertical file, Scotty's Castle Resource Library, NPS: DEVA.
- Bessie Johnson vertical file, Scotty's Castle Resource Library, NPS: DEVA.
- Dubovay, Charles. Interview, Scotty's Castle Resource Library, NPS: DEVA.
- Historic Resource Study: Death Valley Scotty Historic District, Draft Version, Scotty's Castle Resource Library, NPS: DEVA.
