= Walter E. Scott =

American prospector (1872–1954)

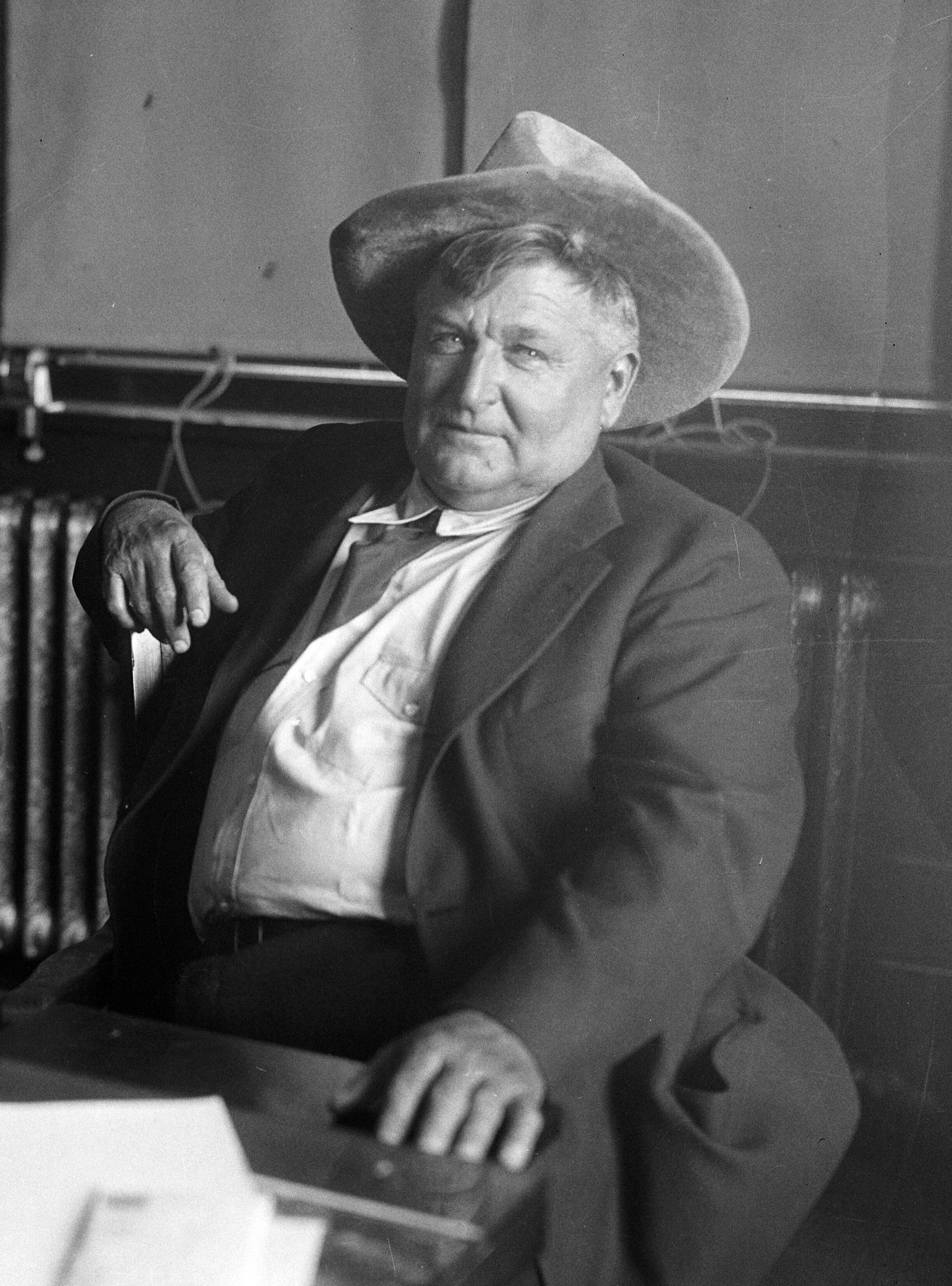
- Scott between 1925 and 1935
- Born: September 20, 1872; Cynthiana, Kentucky, U.S.
- Died: January 5, 1954 (aged 81); Death Valley, California, U.S.
- Resting place: Scotty's Castle grounds, Death Valley National Park
- Known for: Fraudulent mining schemes, affiliation with Scotty's Castle, affiliation with Buffalo Bill.
- Spouse: Ella Josephine Milius Scott a.k.a. "Jack"
- Children: 1

Walter Edward Perry Scott (September 20, 1872 – January 5, 1954), also known as Death Valley Scotty, was a prospector, performer, and con man who was made famous by his many scams involving gold mining and the mansion in Death Valley, known as Scotty's Castle.

== Early years ==
Scott was born in Cynthiana in Harrison County in northern Kentucky, to George E. Scott (or George A. Scott according to his IGI record) and wife, the former Anna Calhoun (or Elizabeth Perry according to his IGI record). He spent the early years of his childhood traveling with his family around the harness racing circuit, and at age 11 he left home to join his two brothers at a ranch near Wells, Nevada. In 1884, he made his first visit to Death Valley, as part of a crew surveying the California-Nevada state line. At age 16, he joined Buffalo Bill Cody's Wild West Show as a stunt rider. For the next 12 years, he toured the United States and Europe with the show.

Scott's involvement with the show ended in 1900, when he married Ella Josephine Milius (whom he called "Jack") in New York City. The couple moved to Cripple Creek, Colorado, where Scott unsuccessfully tried to start a gold mining operation. After he was not allowed to rejoin the Wild West Show, he conned a wealthy New York City businessman into backing a fictitious gold mining operation. For two years, he continuously informed his patron about the state of the mine, but he never shipped any ore. After his patron had invested more than $5,000 in the mine, Scott boarded a train bound for New York with a bag supposedly containing more than $12,000 in gold dust. After he claimed that the bag had been stolen before he reached his destination, the newspapers eagerly picked up the story, starting Scott on a spree of self-promotion ventures. In 1904, he abandoned his previous patron in favor of Edward A. Shedd and Albert M. Johnson. They poured more than $4,000 into his scam over a period of several months, before pulling out of the deal.

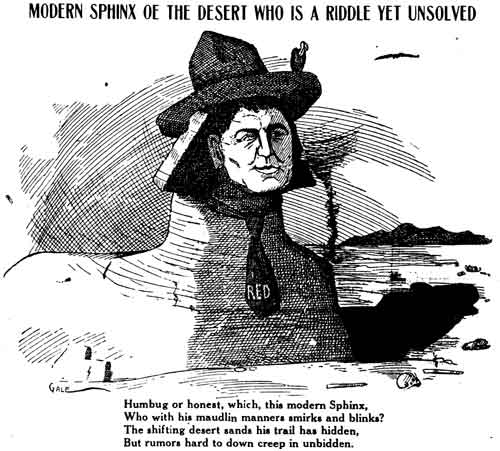
Newspaper cartoon of "Death Valley Scotty", around 1905

In 1905, Scott announced that he would break the cross-country train speed record. For $5,500, he contracted with the Atchison, Topeka & Santa Fe Railway to provide a special train. On July 9, he left Los Angeles for Chicago in the train, called the "Scott Special", consisting of an engine, a baggage car, a sleeper, and a dining car. The only passengers were Scott and his wife Jack, F. N. Holman, and Charles E. Van Loan, a writer for the Los Angeles Examiner. The trip was completed in 44 hours and 54 minutes, breaking the previous record of just under 53 hours. This stunt once again catapulted Scott to the front pages of newspapers the nation over, and inspired Buffalo Bill Cody to hire an impersonator of Scott for his show.

Throughout 1905 and 1906, Scott continued to attempt to con investors into backing his "mining" endeavors, and was largely successful, using many ruses to evade the investigators that his potential backers sent to check on the state of his mines. On March 11, 1906, a play about Scott opened in Seattle to standing room only, with Scott playing the leading role. When the play finished, Scott was arrested on assorted charges for his involvement in fooling investigators earlier that year. The charges were dismissed on a technicality, but the trial had made clear that Scott was a fraud. However, he refused to admit anything and somehow managed to keep Albert Johnson interested in his "mine". Another investigator was sent, who reported back that the mine did not exist. The following year, after Johnson hadn't seen any gold from the supposed mine, he decided to visit the mine himself. He left empty-handed. Several years later, he formed a lifelong friendship with Scott.

Around this time, Scott began fencing high-grade ore that he had stolen from mines in the area. As a front for his stolen-ore operation he leased a mine in the Humboldt Mountains. In 1912, he returned to Death Valley and announced that he had sold his mine for $12 million. After he made this claim, he was sued by his creditors for old debts, and ended up in jail.

== Later years ==
In 1915, Scott moved to Twentynine Palms, California, where he lived quietly until Johnson decided to visit him. Johnson eventually forgave Scott for his fraudulent scheming, and the two became friends. Johnson soon purchased the Staininger Ranch in Grapevine Canyon for his own use, and in 1929, prior to the stock market crash, began developing the property of what later became Lower Vine Ranch, approximately five miles (8 km) away. Although Johnson had originally installed quarters for Scotty at Grapevine, he also built a roomy five-room cabin for Scott at Lower Vine, as well as several outbuildings and a corral for Scott's beloved mules. Johnson also used the land at Lower Vine for a short while to farm alfalfa so he could legally claim the property for himself under the Homesteading Act. Scott immediately returned to his old ways of spreading unbelievable tales about his mine, which Johnson did nothing to discourage, regarding it as merely amusement.

=== Scotty's Castle ===
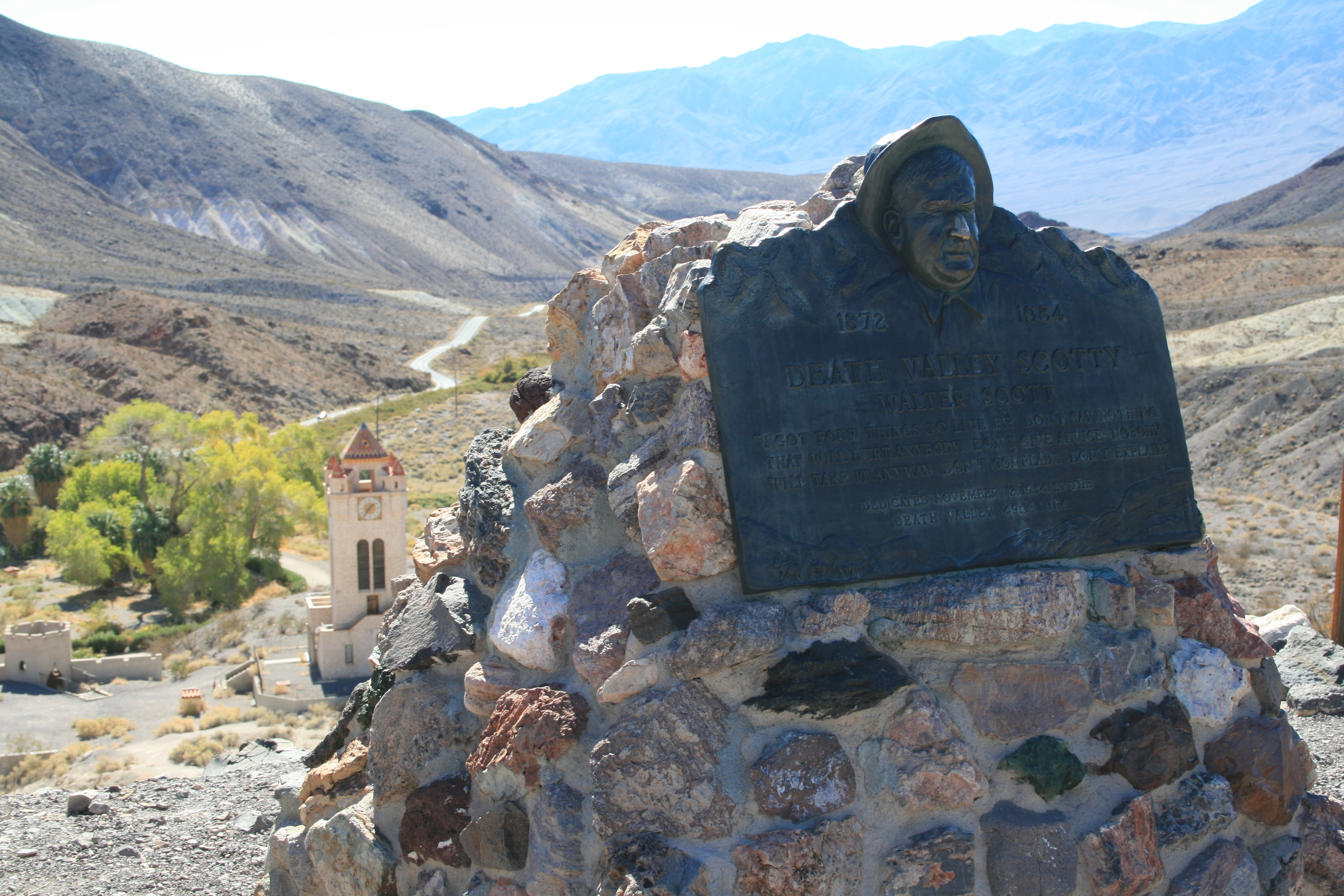
Scotty's grave

In 1922, construction began at the Staininger Ranch on what was to be the new Johnson vacation home. As people saw the scale of the project, speculation was rampant that Scott did have a mine after all. Scott claimed that he had built the castle for himself, and it became known as "Scotty's Castle", although the name over the front door read "Death Valley Ranch". Scott himself rarely stayed in the castle proper, staying mainly at his cabin in Lower Vine Ranch, and putting in appearances at the castle to entertain dinner guests with his stories.

In 1931, it was learned that because of a surveying error, Johnson did not actually own the land on which the castle was being built. The problem was rectified in 1935, but construction could not be completed as Johnson's National Life Insurance Company had gone into bankruptcy two years earlier. Johnson willed Death Valley Ranch to a religious organization, with the provision that Scotty could live there as long as he wished. Scotty's Castle was never completed, but Scotty lived there until his death in 1954; he is interred above the castle.

== Scott's family ==
Scott's wife, Jack and child, Walter Perry Scott, who was born in 1914, remained separated from Scott for the most part. The Johnsons were charitable, and made several efforts to financially assist Jack and Scott's son, who were not receiving any money from Scott himself. The Johnsons took young Walter Perry into their home for a period of several years and even considered adopting the child. When that idea did not pan out, Johnson bought Jack a house in Reno, Nevada, and began paying her a monthly sum that varied between $100 and $150 to help support her child. The Johnsons eventually provided the funds for Walter Perry to attend a military academy. Walter Perry Scott joined the navy, and Jack moved to Long Beach, California. Johnson continued sending money to Jack throughout her life, although the sum was necessarily reduced after the stock market crash of 1929 to only $50.

In 1937, after years of living in poverty on the meager sum provided by Johnson and any money she could acquire through menial jobs, Jack brought Scott to court demanding $1,000 per month to support herself and her son, and a share of whatever interests Scott held in Scotty's Castle and the gold mine Jack still believed he had. The lawsuit failed because Scotty did not have any legal interests in mining or the castle, and certainly did not have the funds to pay her $1,000 per month. Jack then immediately turned her suit against Johnson himself, accusing him of manipulating her husband and hiding his finances, so as to thwart her. Johnson, of course, had no legal obligation to pay Jack any money at all, nor to give her a share in any of his property, so Jack's lawsuit again failed. Johnson took pity on her, however, and raised the monthly amount he gave her to $75.

== Television depiction ==
Scott is the subject of the 1955 episode, "Death Valley Scotty," on the syndicated television anthology series Death Valley Days, hosted by Stanley Andrews. The actor Jack Lomas (1911–1959) played Scotty, who in 1905 had commissioned the "Scott Special," a passenger train of the Atchison, Topeka and Santa Fe Railway. The steam locomotive Santa Fe No. 1010 was used to re-create the record-setting 44-hour railroad run from Los Angeles to Chicago and was reconditioned especially for filming. William Schallert was cast as Albert Mussey Johnson, Scotty's millionaire benefactor.

== Sources ==
- Death Valley Scotty (Desert USA)
- Death Valley Scotty
- Scotty's Castle
- Scotty's Castle Historical Report, Scotty's Castle Archive, NPS: DEVA.
- Ella Josephine Scott vertical file, Scotty's Castle Archive, NPS: DEVA.
- Walter E. Scott vertical file, Scotty's Castle Archive, NPS: DEVA.
- Plazak, Dan. A Hole in the Ground with a Liar at the Top. ISBN 978-0-87480-840-7 (includes a chapter on Walter Scott)
- IGI Pedigree Record
