= Royal Army =

Royal Army may refer to:

== Past ==
- French Royal Army (French: Armée royale, "Royal Army"), an army from 1652 to 1830
- Royal Albanian Army (Albanian: Ushtria Mbretërore, "Royal Army"), an army from 1924 to 1939
- Royal Hungarian Army
- Royal Italian Army (Italian: Regio Esercito, "Royal Army"), an army from 1861 to 1946
- Royal Sardinian Army, from 1416 until it became the Royal Italian Army on 4 May 1861
- Royal Saxon Army
- Royal Serbian Army, the army of Serbia that existed between 1882 and 1918
- Royal Yugoslav Army, the army of Yugoslavia from 1918 to 1941

== Present ==
=== In Asia ===
- Royal Bahraini Army
- Royal Cambodian Army (Khmer: កងទ័ពជើងគោក, Kâng Toăp Cheung Koŭk; lit. 'Land Army')
- Royal Jordanian Army
- Royal Army of Oman (Arabic: الجيش الملكي, "Royal Army")
- Royal Thai Army

=== Elsewhere ===
- Royal Danish Army
- Royal Moroccan Army (Arabic: الجيش الملكي, "Royal Army")
- Royal Netherlands Army (Dutch: Koninklijke Landmacht, "Royal Army")

== See also ==
- British Army, often mistakenly referred to as "Royal"
- Imperial Army (disambiguation)
- Imperial Navy (disambiguation)
- Royal Navy (disambiguation)
- Royal Air Force (disambiguation)
- Royal Armed Forces (disambiguation)
