= RAF (disambiguation) =

The RAF is the Royal Air Force, the air force of the United Kingdom.

RAF or Raf may also refer to:

== Military and paramilitary ==
- Rapid Action Force, India, paramilitary police
- Regionally aligned forces, United States army
- Royal Aircraft Factory, UK, 1912–1918
- Russian Armed Forces, the Russian military
- Russian Air Force, the air force of Russia

== Organizations ==
- Real American Freestyle, an American wrestling promotion
- Recreational Aviation Foundation, United States
- Red Army Faction, a left-wing militant group in West Germany
- Riga Autobus Factory, a factory in Latvia
- Road Accident Fund, South Africa
- Rodez AF or le Raf, a French football club
- Russian Automobile Federation, a Russian motorist association

== People ==
- Raf (comics) (1928–1997), Spanish comic author
- Raf (singer) (born 1959), Italian singer
- RAF Camora (born 1984), Austrian rapper
- Raf de Gregorio (born 1977), New Zealand soccer player
- Raf Simons (born 1968), Belgian fashion designer
- Raf Vallone (1916–2002), Italian actor
- Constantine Samuel Rafinesque (taxonomic author abbreviation: Raf.; 1783–1840), French polymath

== Science and technology ==
- RAF kinase, a protein family
- .raf, raw image format used by Fuji

== Other uses ==
- R.A.F. (film), a 1935 British documentary film
- "Raf" (song), a song by 2017 by ASAP Mob
- Retired after finishing, a sailing race term
- Raf coffee, Russian espresso beverage

== See also ==
- Royal Air Force (disambiguation), several air forces
- Raff, a surname
