= Saline Valley Hot Springs =

Thermal springs in California

- Saline Valley Warm Springs
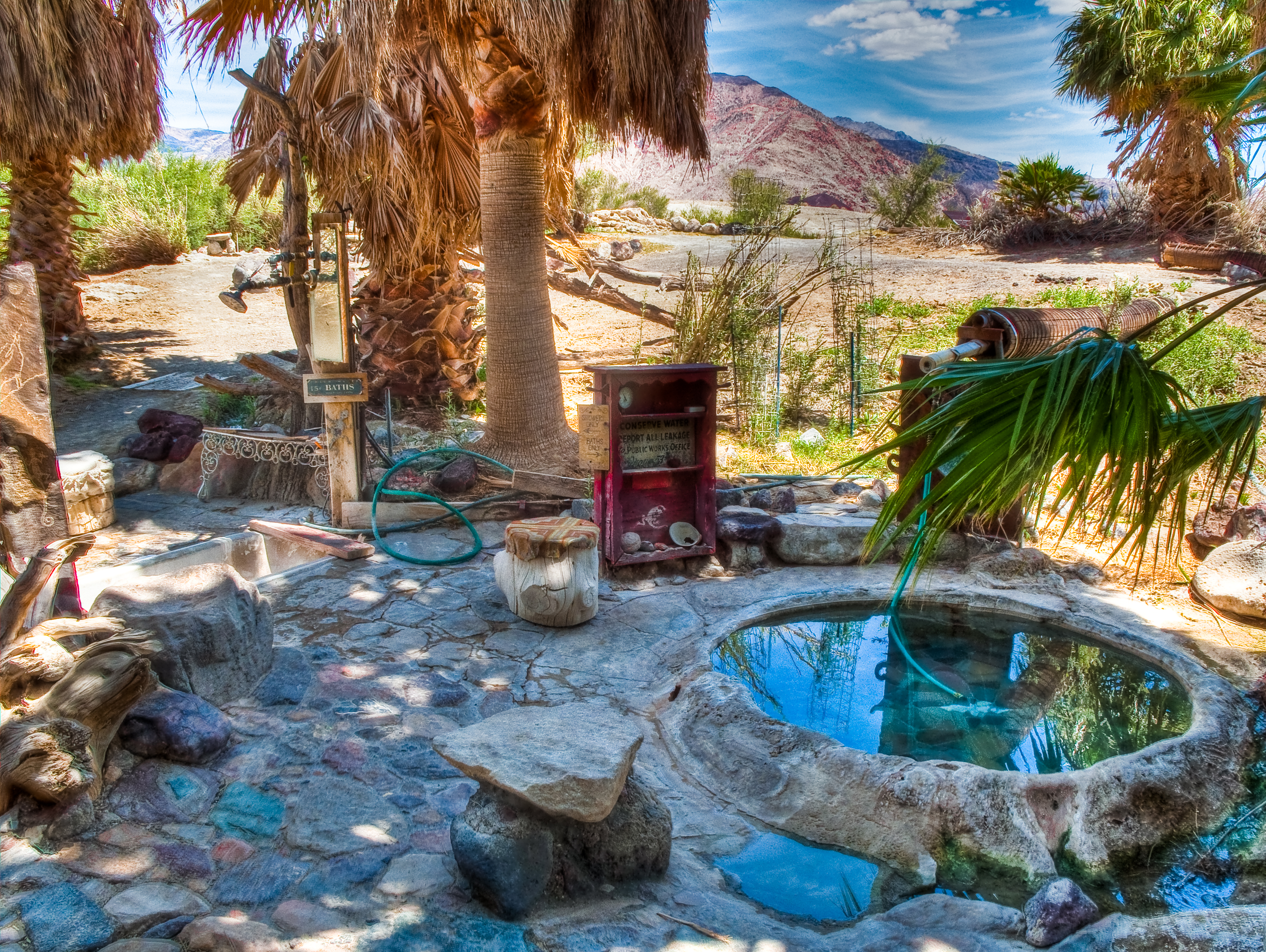
- Interactive map of Saline Valley Hot Springs
- Location: Saline Valley, Death Valley National Park, California
- Coordinates: 36.8056°N 117.7734°W
- Spring source: aquifer
- Elevation: 1,500 ft (460 m)
- Type: Geothermal
- Temperature: Range: 98°F to 112°F

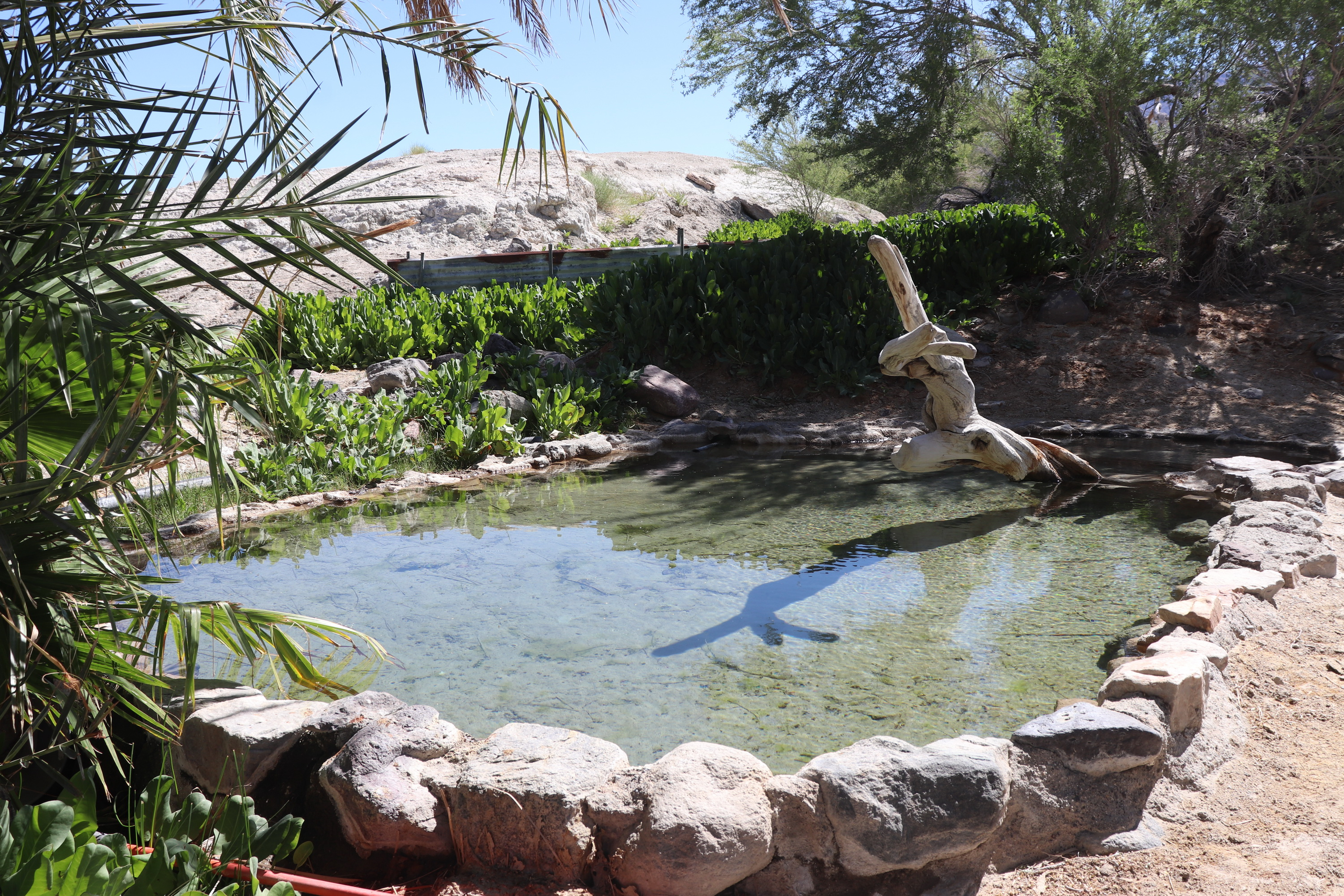
Saline Valley Lower Spring

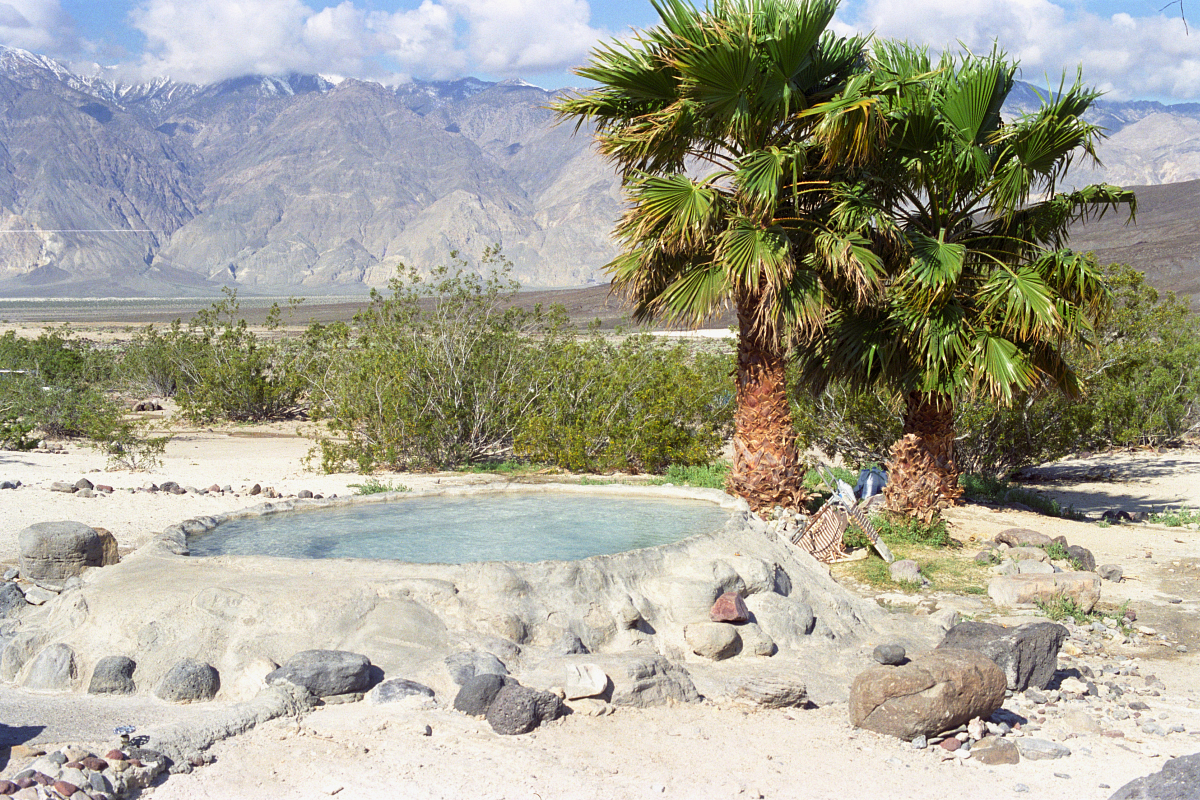
Saline Valley Palm Spring

Saline Valley Hot Springs are a series of three thermal springs located in the remote Saline Valley area of Death Valley National Park.

== Description ==
Each of the three main springs have several primitive soaking pools constructed from local rock, concrete and tile. Locals from the area constructed nearby showers, and a dishwashing station for visitors. The National Park System installed vault toilets nearby. Overnight parking is permitted up to 30 days per year.

In 2019 the National Park Service finalized a management plan for the hot springs pertaining to visitor use and cultural and natural resource preservation. Three new camping areas are being developed approximately 100 feet or more from the spring sources to support car camping as well as walk-in campers. The springs are only accessible via a 50-mile long undeveloped dirt road with no facilities.

=== Lower Warm Springs ===
The lower warm springs consist of a series of intermittent soaking pools; as of 2011 the lower pool is consistently filled with warm spring water. The temperature of the warm springs is 110 °F.

=== Palm Spring ===
There are two primitive soaking pools fed by Palm Spring. The Wizard Pool is one of the hottest thermal springs in the Saline Valley with temperatures between 105 °F and 112 °F. The three and-a-half foot deep hexagonal soaking pool was built in the 1980s from rock and concrete. Seating has been built surrounding the pool. The Volcano Pool has a cooler temperature than Wizard pool, and is also constructed from rock and concrete and is above ground, whereas Wizard is below ground. Volcano is 15 feet across, with temperatures ranging from 98 °F to 104 °F.

=== Upper Warm Spring ===
Upper Warm Spring emerges from the source at 102 °F. It consists of two soaking pools, a small sand-bottomed pool and a cool water pool.

== Water profile ==
The hot spring water emerges from the source between 102 °F and 112 °F.

== Location ==
The springs are located in a remote valley within Death Valley National Park, accessible by a 50-mile long dirt road through deep desert. The Chicken Strip, a non-towered, makeshift dirt landing strip is found nearby.

== See also ==
- Saline Valley salt tram
