= Imperial guard =

Special group of troops directly associated with the ruler of an empire

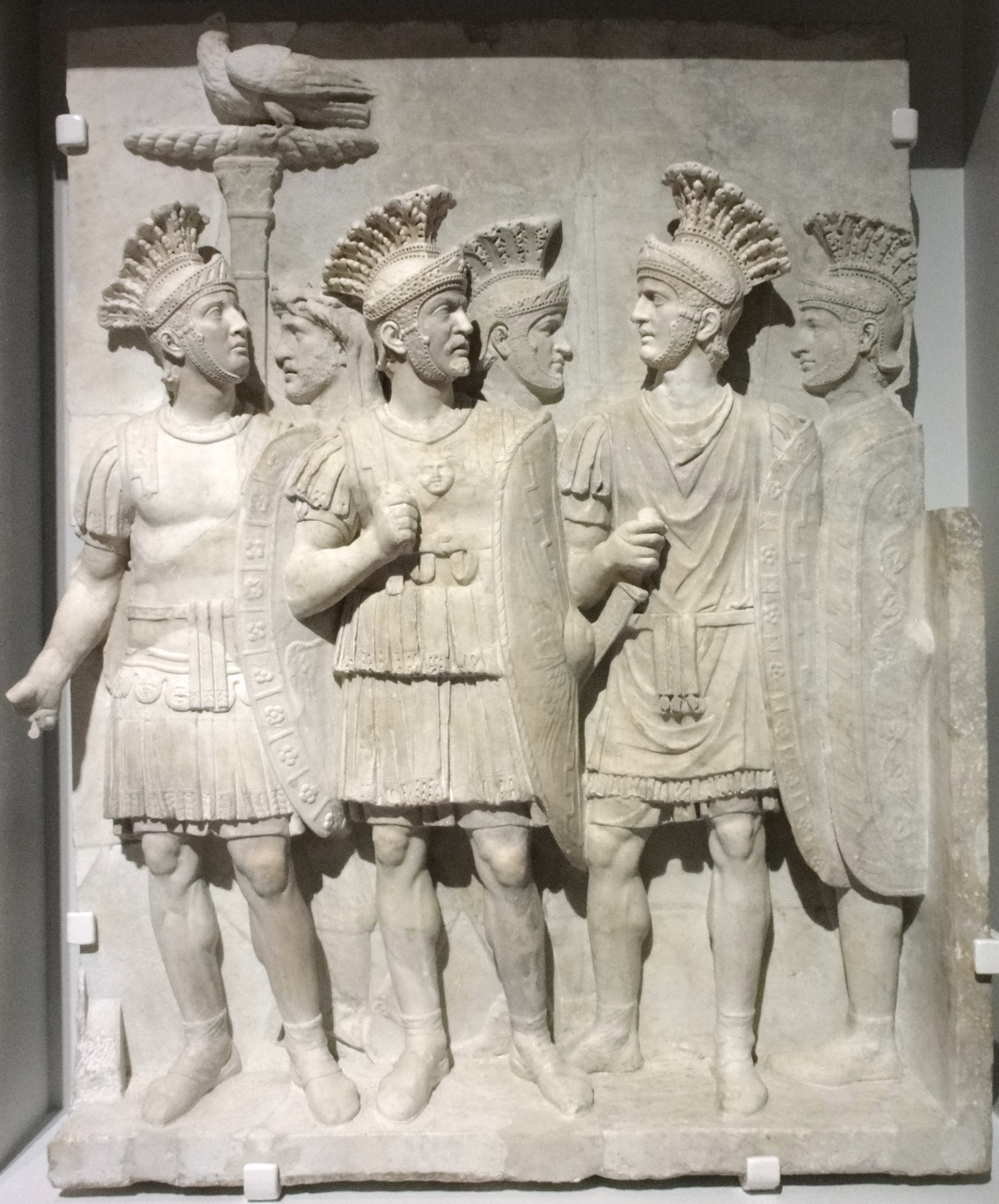
Praetorian guardsmen featured in a marble relief from the Arch of Claudius (51/52 AD)

An imperial guard or palace guard is a special group of troops (or a member thereof) of an empire, typically closely associated directly with the emperor and/or empress. Usually these troops embody a more elite status than other imperial forces, including the regular armed forces, and maintain special rights, privileges and traditions.

Because the head of state often wishes to be protected by the best soldiers available, their numbers and organisation may be expanded to carry out additional tasks. Napoleon's Imperial Guard is an example of this.

In heterogeneous polities reliant on a greater degree of coercion to maintain central authority the political reliability and loyalty of the guard is the most important factor in their recruitment. In such cases the ranks of the guard may be filled with on the one hand royal kinsman and clansman with a stake in the survival of the ruling family, and on the other with members socially and culturally divorced from the general population and therefore reliant on imperial patronage for their survival, for example the Varangian Guards (recruiting solely foreigners), and the Janissaries (Christian children taken as slaves from childhood, to serve the Muslim sultan).

In the post-colonial period, the term has been used colloquially and derisively to describe the staff of a person, usually a politician or corporate executive officer, that acts to prevent direct communication with the person.

== List of imperial guards ==
=== Africa ===
- Mehal Sefari and Kebur Zabagna of the Ethiopian Empire
- Esho of the Oyo Empire

=== Americas ===
- Imperial Guard of the Archers, Brazilian Imperial bodyguards during the Empire of Brazil

=== Asia ===
Chinese

- The 8,000 Terracotta Warriors protecting the Emperor of China in the afterlife.
- The Northern Army of the Han dynasty was the standing professional army branch of the Han Empire, garrisoned around the capital. Several units from this army would be given the honor of guarding the emperor in the capitol.
- The Feathered Forest (imperial guards unit composed of primarily or entirely cavalry) [Elite Yulin] of the Army of the Han dynasty
- The Rapid as Tigers (imperial guards unit) [Elite Huben] of the Army of the Han dynasty
- Imperial Guards (Tang dynasty), formed initially as honour bodyguards of the emperor and garrison of the capital, and evolved to reflect the era's transition of reliance on professional soldiery over non-professional volunteers and conscripts.
- Embroidered Uniform Guard, Ming Dynasty secret police organization founded by the Hongwu Emperor in 1368 to serve as his personal bodyguards.
- Shìwèi, in the Qing dynasty of China
- Imperial Guards Brigade of Manchu Banner soldiers, entrusted with guarding the person of the Emperor of China and the Forbidden City during the Qing dynasty
- Imperial Guard of Manchukuo

Japanese

- Imperial Guard (Japan) in service protection of the Emperor of Japan. Later part of the Japanese Army and since 1947, part of the National Police of Japan.
- Imperial Guard of the National Police Agency, in Japan

Iranian

- The 10,000-strong Immortals, an elite heavy infantry unit of the Achaemenid Empire from 550 BC–330 BC, functioning as both an Imperial Guard and a faction of the Achaemenid army
- The Immortals, the Iranian Imperial Guard, existing in Iran in the 20th century under the Imperial State of Iran

Indian

- ValaShahis, in Mughal Empire
- Sikh Akali-Nihang (Immortal Crocodiles) warriors who have played the pivotal role in Sikh military history were also the guards of the Sikh Gurus, who are considered as Sache Patishah (True Emperors).

Elsewhere

- Janissaries and Baltadji of the Ottoman Empire
- Kheshig of the Mongol Empire

=== Europe ===
Austro-Hungarian

- Arcièren-Leibgarde (Lifeguard of Halberdiers), in the Austro-Hungarian Empire 1700–1918
- Hofburgwache (Palace Bodyguard) in the Austrian Empire. Became the Leibgarde-Infantrerie-Kompanie (Guard Infantry Company) in 1802.
- Leibgarde-Reiter-Eskedron (Bodyguard Mounted Squadron) in the Austro-Hungarian Empire until 1918
- Trabanten Leibgarde (Gentlemen at Arms), in the Austro-Hungarian Empire until 1918

French

- Imperial Guard (Napoleon I) and Mamelukes of the Imperial Guard of the First French Empire.
- Imperial Guard (Napoleon III) of the Second French Empire

Roman and Byzantine

- The Praetorian Guard of the Imperial Roman Army in Ancient Rome, from 27 BC – 312 AD.
- The Equites singulares Augusti, Imperial Horse Guards of the Roman Emperors
- The Imperial German Bodyguard, present during the Julio-Claudian dynasty
- Jovians and Herculians, elite Guards legions during the Tetrarchy
- Scholae Palatinae, late Roman Imperial Guards in both Western and Eastern Empires. Established in ca. 312, in the West until the 490s, in Byzantine service until ca. 1080.
- Excubitors, Byzantine imperial guards established under the Byzantine emperor Leo I the Thracian
- Spatharioi, Byzantine palace guards in the 5th-8th centuries
- Tagmata, elite Byzantine guard units in the 8th-11th centuries
- Hetaireia, Byzantine mercenary guard composed of men from Eastern Europe and Central Asia in the 9th-12th centuries
- Varangian Guard, Byzantine palace guards and elite soldiers in the 10th-15th centuries

Elsewhere

- Alemannic Guard of Emperor of the Serbs Stefan Uroš IV Dušan the Mighty.
- The Guards Corps of the Prussian, and later of the Imperial German Army
- The Imperial Guard (also known as the Leib Guard) of the Russian Tsars.

== Gallery ==
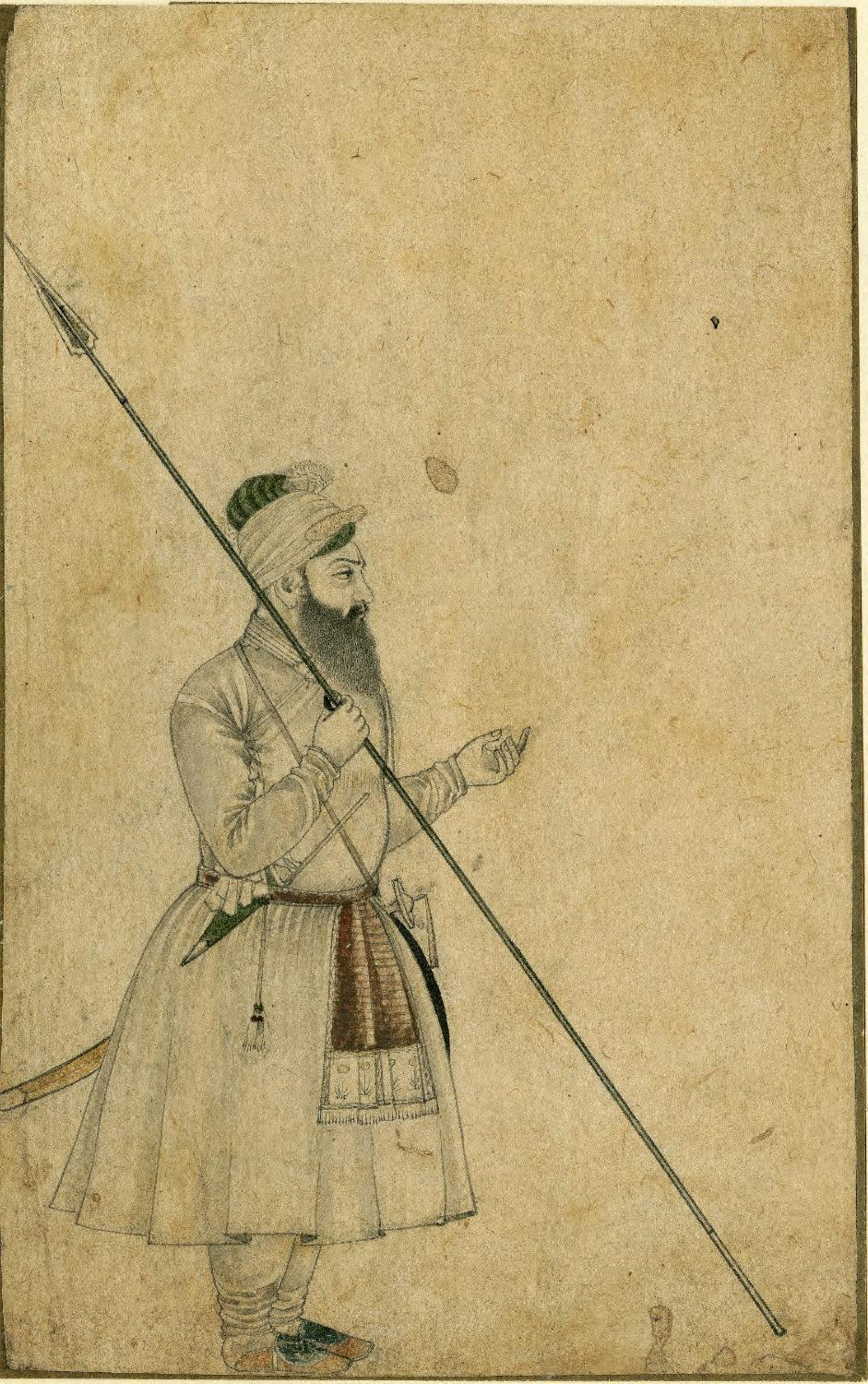
Sawar Khan, one of the Imperial Guards of the Mughal Emperor Shah Jahan

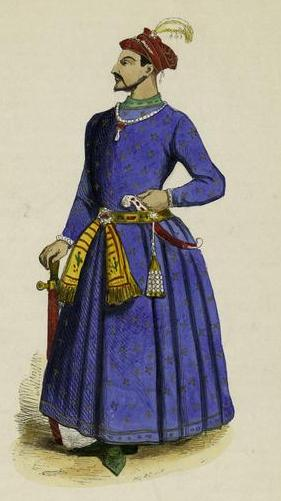
The commander of the Imperial Guard of Delhi

Household Troops: Janissaries of Sultan Murad IV

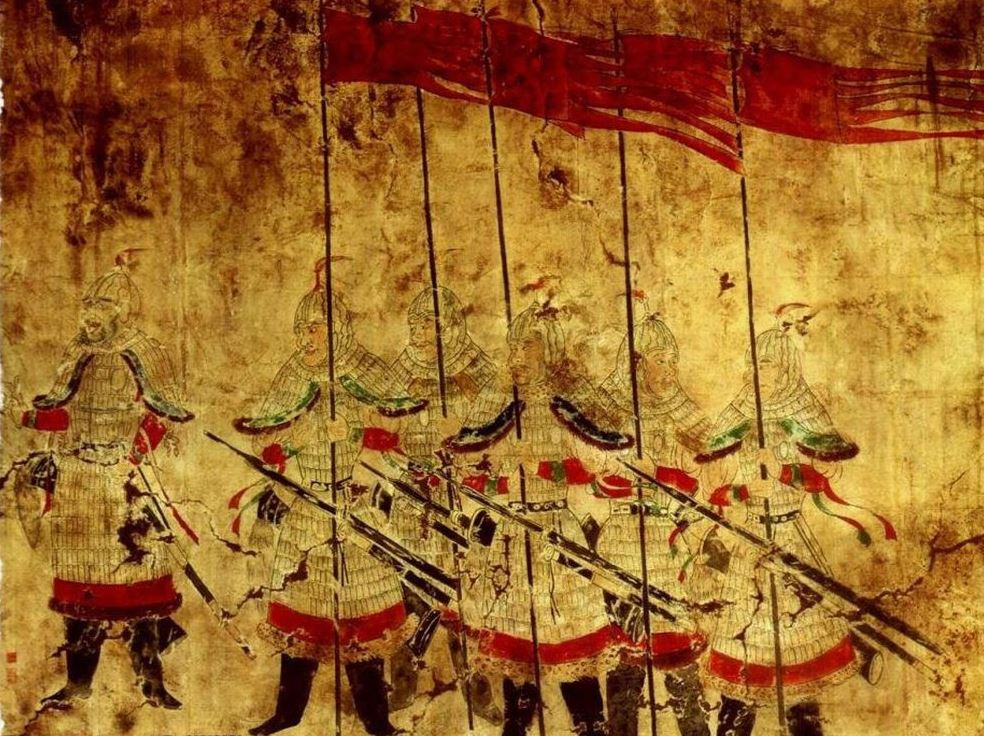
Tang Guards of honour, heavily clad in lamellar armour

== Fiction ==
The term has been used in fiction:

- Imperial Guard, a group of alien warriors in the Marvel Comics universe that are charged with the duty of serving the Shi'ar Empire.
- Emperor's Royal Guard, Darth Sidious's personal protectors in the Star Wars universe.
- The Imperial Guard is the standing army of the Imperium in the Warhammer 40,000 universe. However, the Adeptus Custodes (rather than the Guard, despite their name) actually plays the role of the Emperor's privileged personal guards.
- The Crimson Brigade, the Empire of Izmir's elite fighting unit in the 2000 film titled: Dungeons & Dragons.
- The Sardaukar of the Padishah Emperor and the Fremen Fedaykin of Paul Muad'dib, plus their successors the Fish Speakers both serve as imperial guards in Frank Herbert's Dune saga.
- In Star Trek the Imperial Guard are the Armed Forces of the Andorian Empire as seen on the TV series Star Trek: Enterprise.

== See also ==
- List of empires
- List of largest empires
- List of extinct countries, empires, etc.
- Imperial Army and Imperial Navy
- Royal guard
- Republican guard
- National guard
