= Imperial Guard of the Archers =

Ceremonial palace guards to the Monarch of the Empire of Brazil (1822-89)

Guarda Imperial dos Archeiros Imperial Guard of the Archers
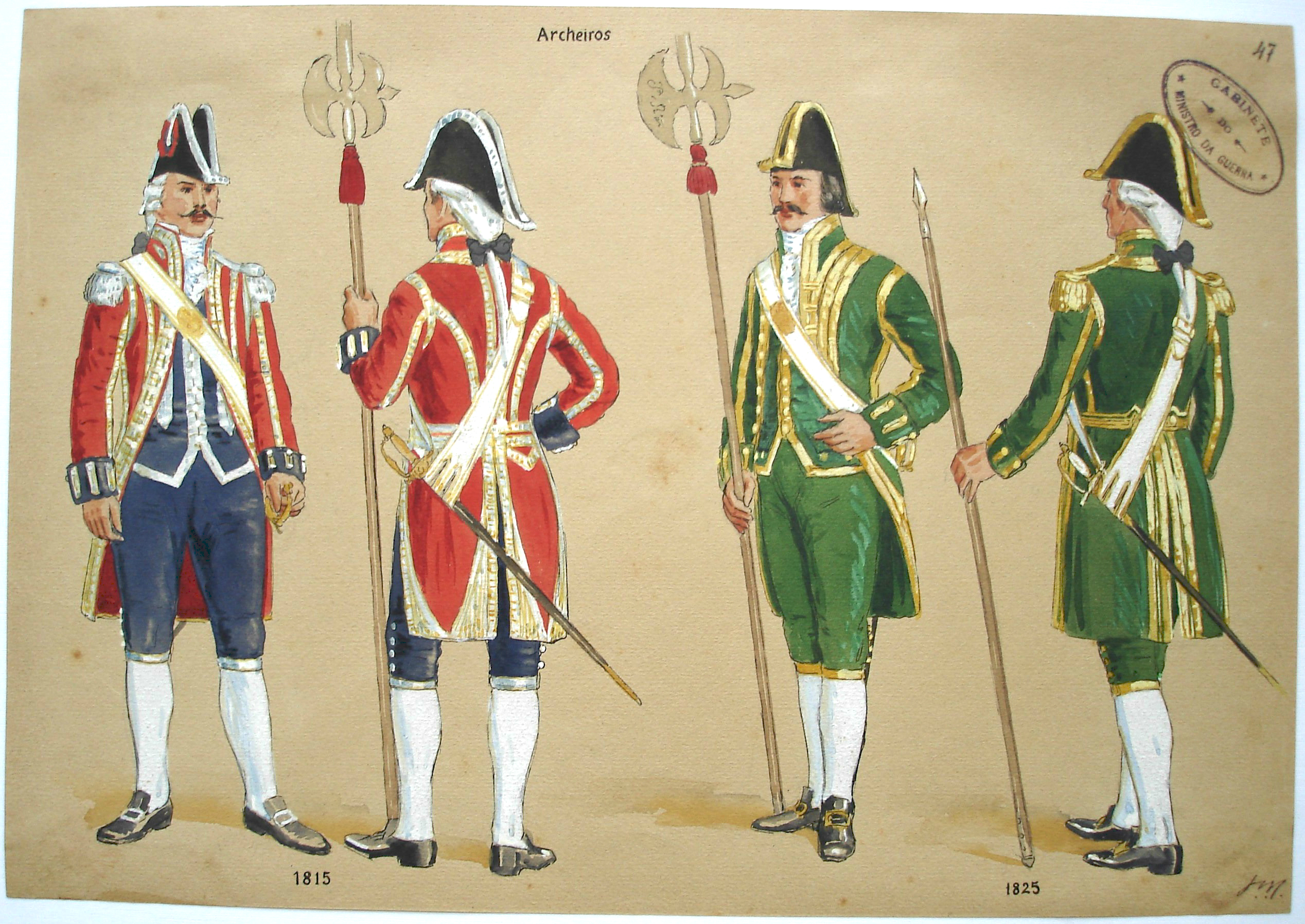
- Portuguese and Brazilian guards of archers
- Active: 1822 – 1889
- Country: Empire of Brazil
- Allegiance: Monarchs of Brazil
- Type: Imperial guard

The Imperial Guard of the Archers (Portuguese: Guarda Imperial dos Archeiros) was the ceremonial palace guard of the Brazilian Monarchs from the establishing of the Empire of Brazil in 1822 until the establishment of the republic in that country in 1889. Its members were armed with halberds. The Guard was modeled after the Portuguese Royal Guard of the Archers.

The Portuguese Monarchs were guarded by the Royal Guard of the Arches, since its creation in the 16th Century. This Guard accompanied the Royal Family when the Portuguese Court was transferred to Brazil, in 1807, due to the invasion of Portugal by the Napoleonic armies. In 1822, Prince Peter of Portugal declared the Independence of Brazil becoming Emperor Peter I of Brazil. Inspired in the Portuguese Guard, Peter I created the similar Imperial Guard of the Archers.

== See also ==
- Royal guard
- Imperial guard
- Royal Guard of the Archers of Portugal
