= Saline Valley salt tram =

Former tram in California, US

- Saline Valley Salt Tram Historic Structure
- U.S. National Register of Historic Places
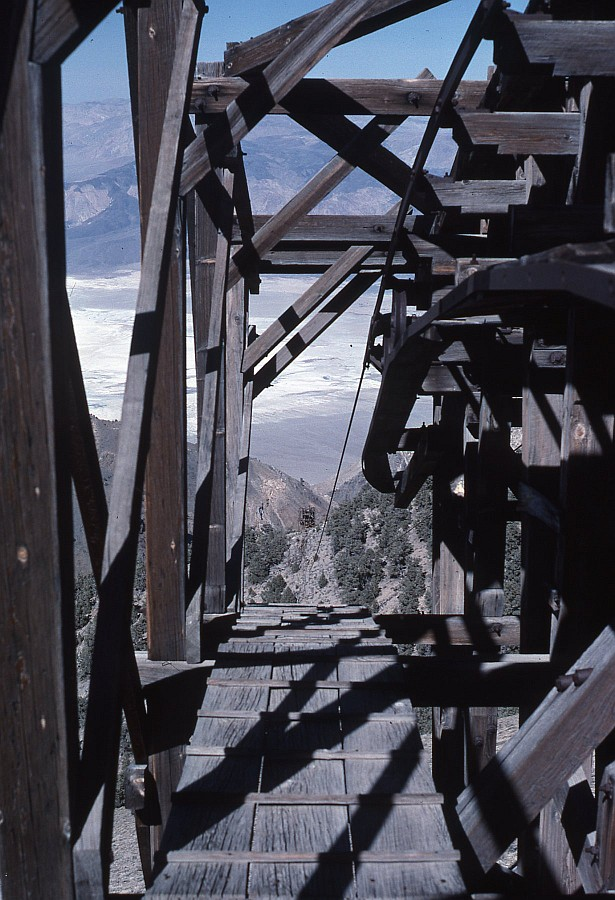
- Saline Valley salt tram summit, 1989

- Location within California Location within the United States
- Location: Inyo Mountains, north of Keeler between Gordo Peak and New York Butte
- Nearest city: Keeler, California, Death Valley National Park
- Coordinates: 36°36′29″N 117°51′13″W
- NRHP reference No.: 74000514
- Added to NRHP: December 31, 1974

The Saline Valley salt tram is located in Inyo County, California, United States. The electric aerial tramway was constructed from 1911 to 1913 to carry salt from the Saline Valley over the Inyo Mountains and into the Owens Valley. Covering a distance of 13.4 mi (21.6 km), it operated sporadically from 1913 to 1935 for four different companies. During its operation, it was the steepest tram in the United States.

The tram was built for the Saline Valley Salt Company (SVSC) by the Trenton Iron Company, but the costs of its construction and operation were ruinously expensive for the SVSC. The salt mining operation and tram were leased in 1915 to the Owens Valley Salt Company until it went bankrupt in 1918. In 1920, the tram was taken over by the Trenton Iron Company, which sold it to the Sierra Salt Company in 1928. The Sierra Salt Company put it back into service until the company went bankrupt in 1935. The tram was included in the National Register of Historic Places on December 31, 1974.

== Background ==
The extraction of salt from the Saline Valley began in 1864, when a farmer residing in the nearby Owens Valley gathered salt from a 12 mi^{2} (31 km^{2}) deposit at the southeastern end of the valley. The farmer sold the 99% pure salt to other settlers in the Owens Valley. Located between the Panamint Range and the Inyo Mountains, access to the Saline Valley was difficult; the transportation of salt before the tram from the Saline Valley to the Owens Valley took two days by wagon despite a straight line distance of only 12 mi (19 km).

Nearly four decades later, in 1902, the Conn and Trudo Borax Company established a borax mine in the Saline Valley. The next year, White Smith, a Tennessee-born attorney working for Conn and Trudo as a teamster, organized the Saline Valley Salt Company (SVSC). The SVSC mined the valley's salt on a small scale from 1903 until the company's president, L. Bourland, died in 1905. Thereafter, Smith took over its direction and began seeking investors to enlarge the SVSC's operations.

In 1908, the SVSC began studying how to move salt more economically from the Saline Valley to the Southern Pacific railroad station near Keeler, California. The company first considered a railway, which could also carry ore from nearby copper mines. This was ruled out as a viable option because of the ruggedness of the Inyo Mountains. The SVSC next considered moving the salt as brine through a pipeline, which the company saw as relatively inexpensive to construct. A pipeline would not allow for the moving of freight into the Saline Valley, however, and in 1911 the SVSC decided to instead construct an aerial tram.

== Construction and operation ==
In order to determine the route and cost of the tramway, the SVSC began a survey of the region to be crossed in April 1911. The terrain was so difficult that some canyons required several days to traverse. The route was finalized in July 1911. On August 14, the SVSC hired the Trenton Iron Company, a subsidiary of the American Steel and Wire Company, to build the tramway. Work began on September 1, and was complicated by the climate – workers labored in temperatures as high as 120 °F (49 °C) – and terrain. To transport materials, a road on the western slopes was extended and a team of eight horses was employed for pulling supplies. On the eastern slopes, where construction of a road was made impossible by the terrain, a temporary, two-cable aerial tram was constructed.

Construction was expected to have been completed by May 1912 at a cost of $250,000 to $500,000 ($8.64 million to $17.3 million as of 2025). Instead, work was not completed until July 2, 1913, at a cost of $750,000 ($24.4 million as of 2025). The SVSC could not afford to continue its operations and in 1915 leased them to the Owens Valley Salt Company, which operated in the Saline Valley until it went bankrupt in 1918. In 1920, the Taylor Milling Company restarted the Saline Valley salt operation but went bankrupt after a year, and the tram was repossessed by the Trenton Iron Company. The Sierra Salt Company reopened the mining operation in 1925 but did not use the tram until they purchased it in 1928. In 1935, the company went bankrupt and the Saline Valley operation was closed.

== Design ==
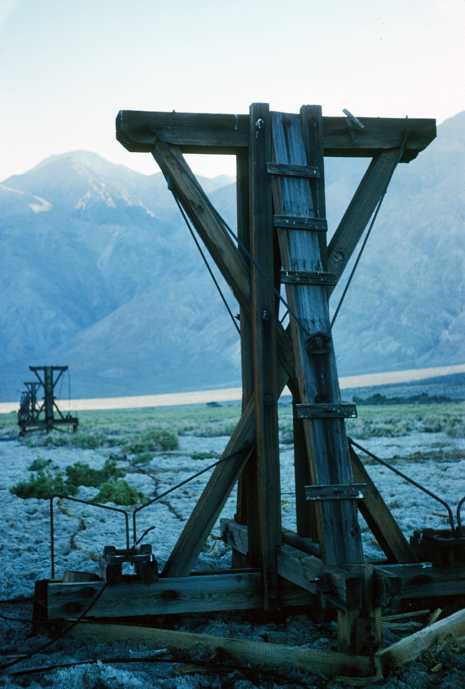
Trusses of the tramway in the Saline Valley

The tramway was 13.4 mi (21.6 km) long and was divided into five sections ranging from 0.75 mi (1.21 km) to 4 mi (6.4 km). Each of these sections was managed by a control station. In addition, there were 34 structures for maintaining tension on the line. From 1913 to 1935, the route was the steepest of any aerial tram in the United States; in some places, the vertical angle from structure to structure could be as much as 40°. The line rose 7,600 ft (2,300 m) from the floor of the Saline Valley to the top of the Inyo Mountains and then descended 5,100 ft (1,600 m) into the Owens Valley.

The tramway used two cables to carry its buckets, which weighed 800 lb (360 kg) when empty and could hold up to 700 lb (320 kg) of salt. The first cable, for loaded buckets, was 1.125 in (28.6 mm) thick. The second cable, for empty buckets, was 0.875 in (22.2 mm) thick. Power was supplied by a 75 hp (56 kW) Westinghouse electric motor at each control station. The tram moved the buckets at 5.5 mph (8.9 km/h); 20 tons of salt could be moved in an hour. While in operation, the tram required two workers at each terminal, two at every control station, and an additional four workers for maintenance.

== Post-closure ==
On October 31, 1973, the Bureau of Land Management nominated the Saline Valley salt tram for inclusion on the National Register of Historic Places. The nomination was received on October 16, 1974, and approved on December 31, 1974, with the reference ID 74000514.

The National Park Service announced in May 2024 that part of the Salt Valley tram ruins had been damaged, stating that someone had toppled one of the towers in April while trying to extricate their vehicle from mud. Three days after the initial announcement, the NPS reported that the people responsible had contacted them and apologized for accidentally damaging the tower while attempting to escape a mire. The NPS also announced that it would review the damage and design a restoration of the tower. The NPS also asked visitors not to try to repair the ruins themselves and reminded visitors to remain on paved roads.

== See also ==
- Keane Wonder Mine
- National Register of Historic Places listings in Inyo County, California
- Rhyolite, Nevada
- Saline Valley Hot Springs
- Tonopah and Tidewater Railroad
