= Royal Guard of the Archers =

Guarda Real dos Archeiros Royal Guard of the Archers
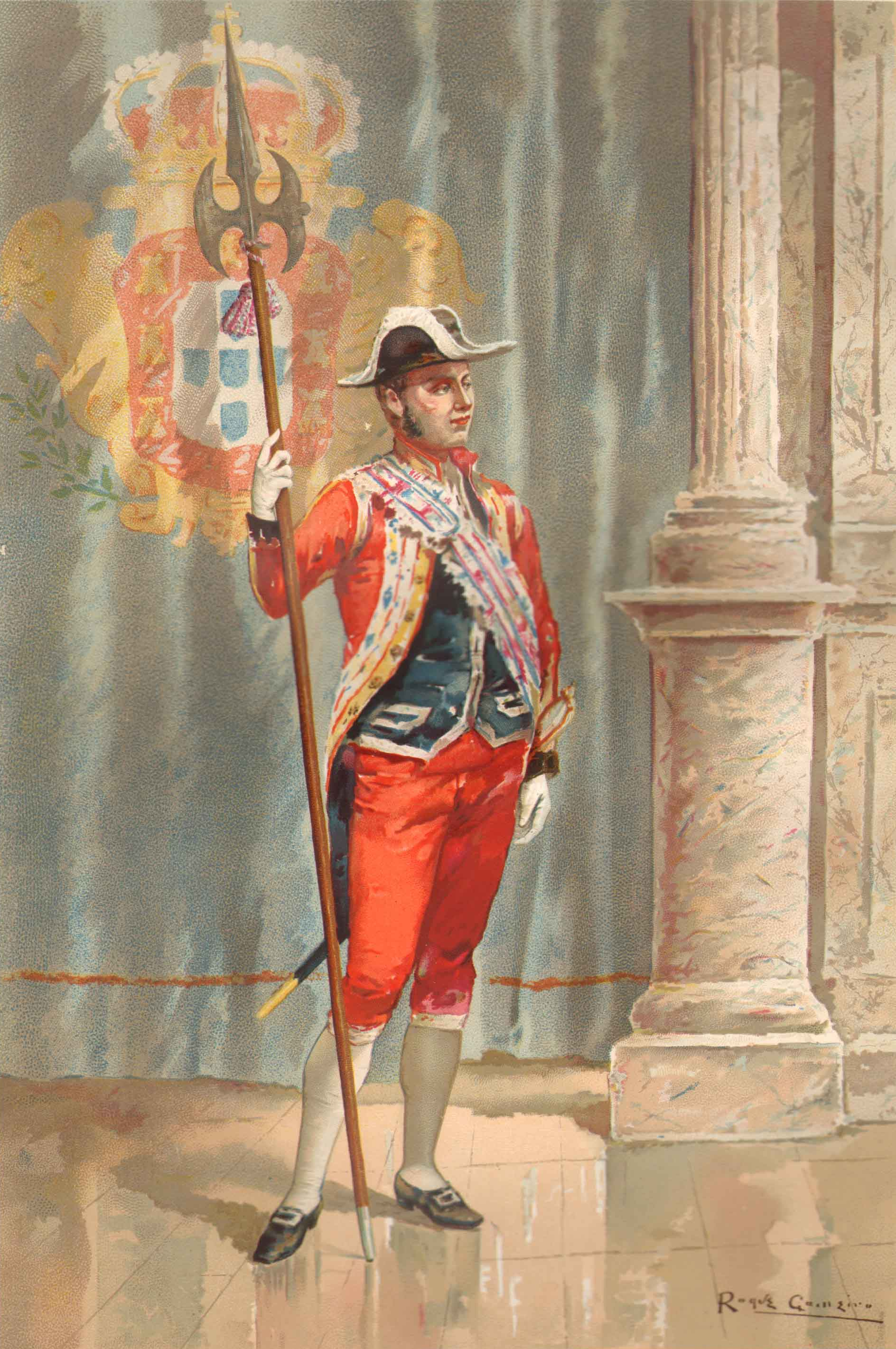
- 1888 illustration of a member of the Royal Guard of the Archers by Alfredo Roque Gameiro
- Active: 16th century – 1910
- Country: Portugal
- Allegiance: Monarchs of Portugal
- Type: Royal guard
- Role: Close combat Crowd control Hand-to-hand combat Executive protection Force protection Public duties Raiding; Reconnaissance; Tracking

The Royal Guard of the Archers (Portuguese: Guarda Real dos Archeiros) was the palace guard of the Portuguese Monarchs from the 16th century until the end of the monarchy in Portugal in 1910. Its members were armed with halberds, the Guard being also known as the Royal Guard of the Halberdiers (Portuguese: Guarda Real dos Alabardeiros).

The Royal Guard of the Archers was mainly a ceremonial guard. The security of the Monarchs and the Royal Family was mainly entrusted to regular Army units, some elite regiments being especially chosen of this function, like the Marines Regiment in the 17th and early 18th centuries and the 2nd Lancers Regiment late 19th and early 20th centuries.

== History ==
Before the existence of the Royal Guard of the Halberdiers, King John II of Portugal created a Guard of Riders (Portuguese: Guarda de Ginetes) for his protection, composed of light cavalry troopers. King Manuel I kept this light cavalry guard and established that it should be composed of 200 riders. Apparently, King John III had discontinued the Guard of Riders, being known that he traveled by public places with little or no guard protection.

The Royal Guard of the Halberdiers was created by King Sebastian, as a company of foot halberdiers, all Portuguese, appointing as its first captain, Francisco de Sá de Meneses, count of Matosinhos.

In 1580, Philip II of Spain became the King of Portugal, establishing the Iberian Union and naming archduke Albert of Austria as Viceroy of Portugal, with residence in Lisbon. The Royal Guard of the Halberdiers was kept, but archduke Albert created within it a second company made up of German halberdiers. The Guard continued to be kept – with the Portuguese and the German companies – by the following viceroys, being mainly responsible by their protection as the Kings didn't live in Portugal.

In the 16th century, similar halberdier guards were created in Portugal by the University of Coimbra and by the Dukes of Braganza. The first – still existing today – was responsible for the policing of the University and the city of Coimbra and the second was responsible for the ducal protection.

On 1 December 1640, Portuguese Independence was restored and Duke John of Braganza became King of Portugal as John IV. John IV kept the Royal Guard of the Halberdiers, with the Portuguese and German companies, while his former ducal guard of halberdiers was transformed into the company of halberdiers of the Prince's guard.

The Royal Guard of the Halberdiers became increasingly just a ceremonial and palace guard. The military protection of the Portuguese Monarchs was given to Army and Marine units. As in Portugal, military units with the specific function of royal guard never existed – except for brief periods in the 19th century – the Kings security was entrusted to regular military units, some elite regiments being preferably chosen for this task.

The Guard followed the Transfer of the Portuguese Court to Brazil in 1807. In 1822, Prince Peter of Portugal declared the Independence of Brazil becoming Emperor Peter I of Brazil. Inspired in the Portuguese Guard, Peter I created a similar Imperial Guard of the Archers (Portuguese: Guarda Imperial dos Archeiros).

By Decree of 28 August 1833, the three companies of the Royal Guard of the Archers were merged in just one company made up only of Portuguese. The Guard existed until the end of the Monarchy and the establishment of the Portuguese Republic on 5 October 1910.

== Gallery ==
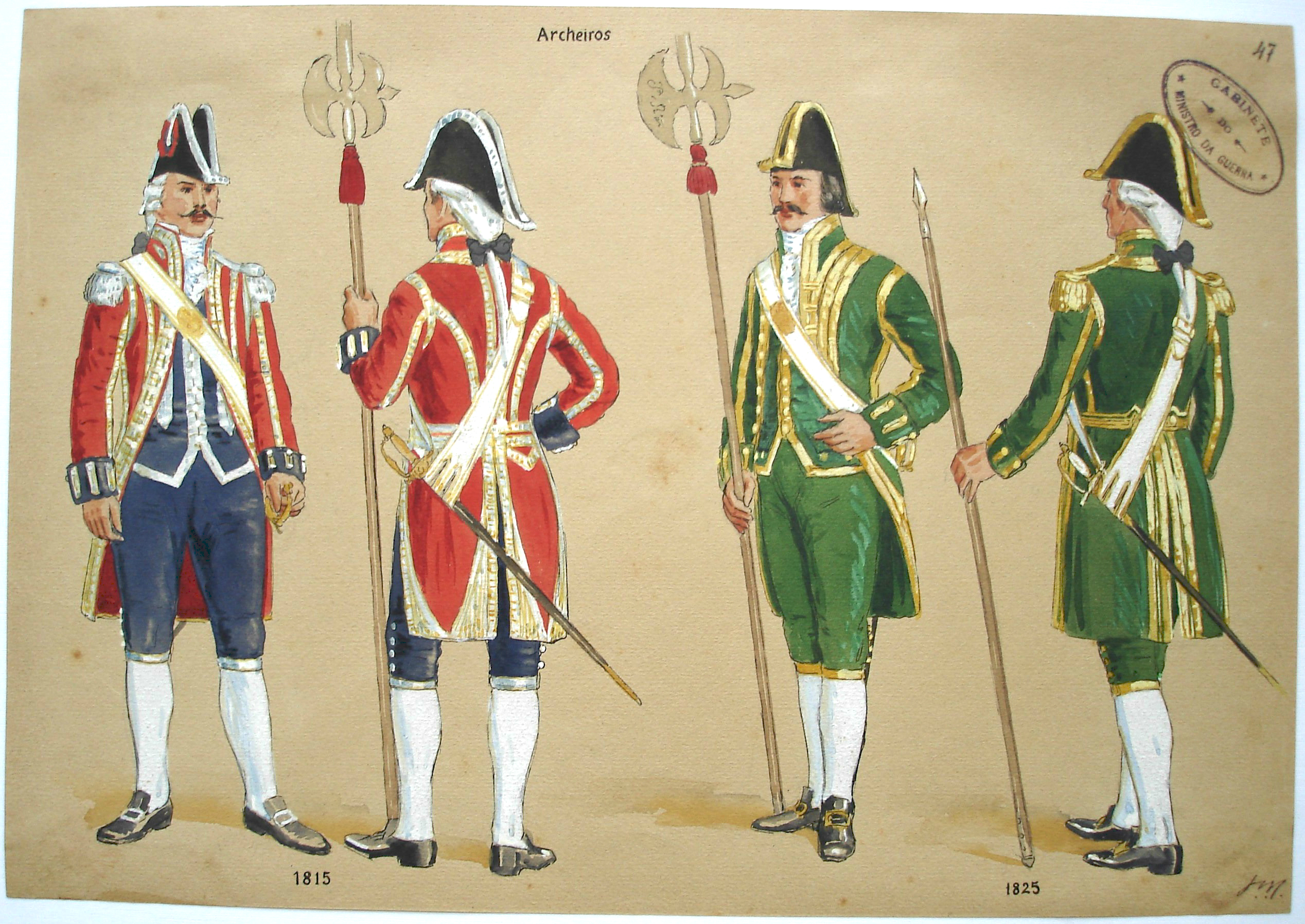
Portuguese Royal and Brazilian Imperial Archers guards uniforms in the early 19th century

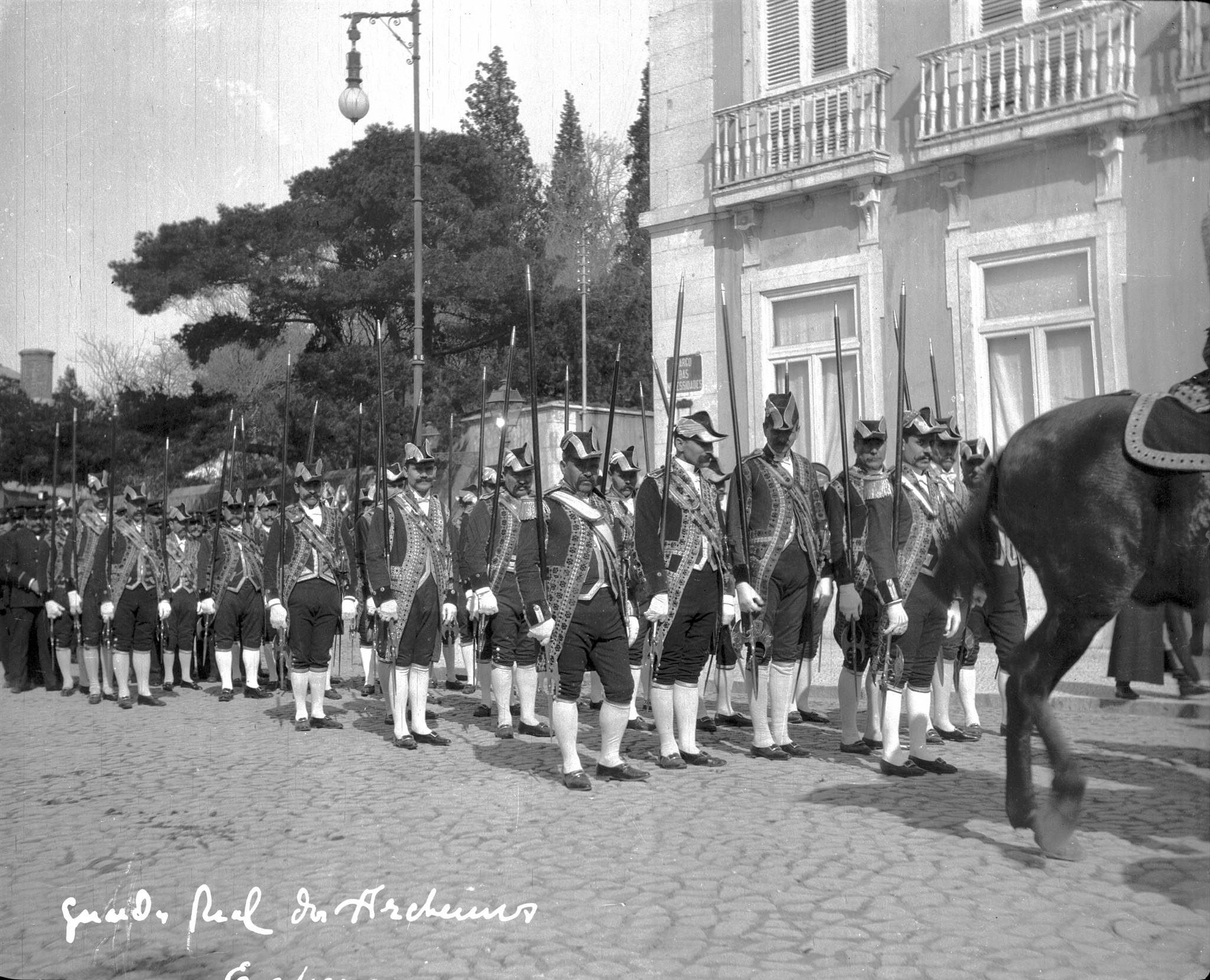
The Archers Guard escorting the funeral procession of King Charles I and Prince Luís Filipe

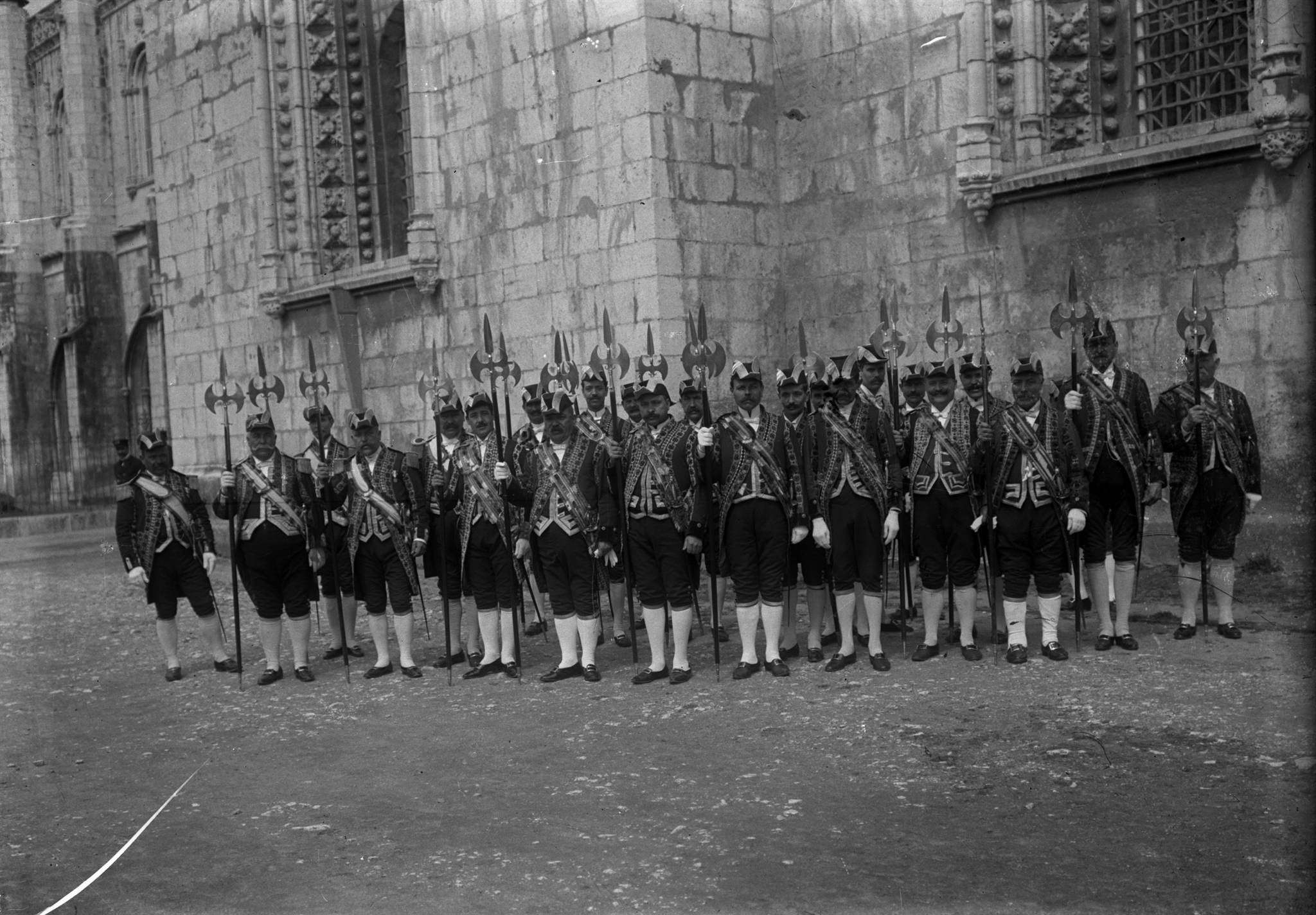
The Royal Guard of the Archers in 1908

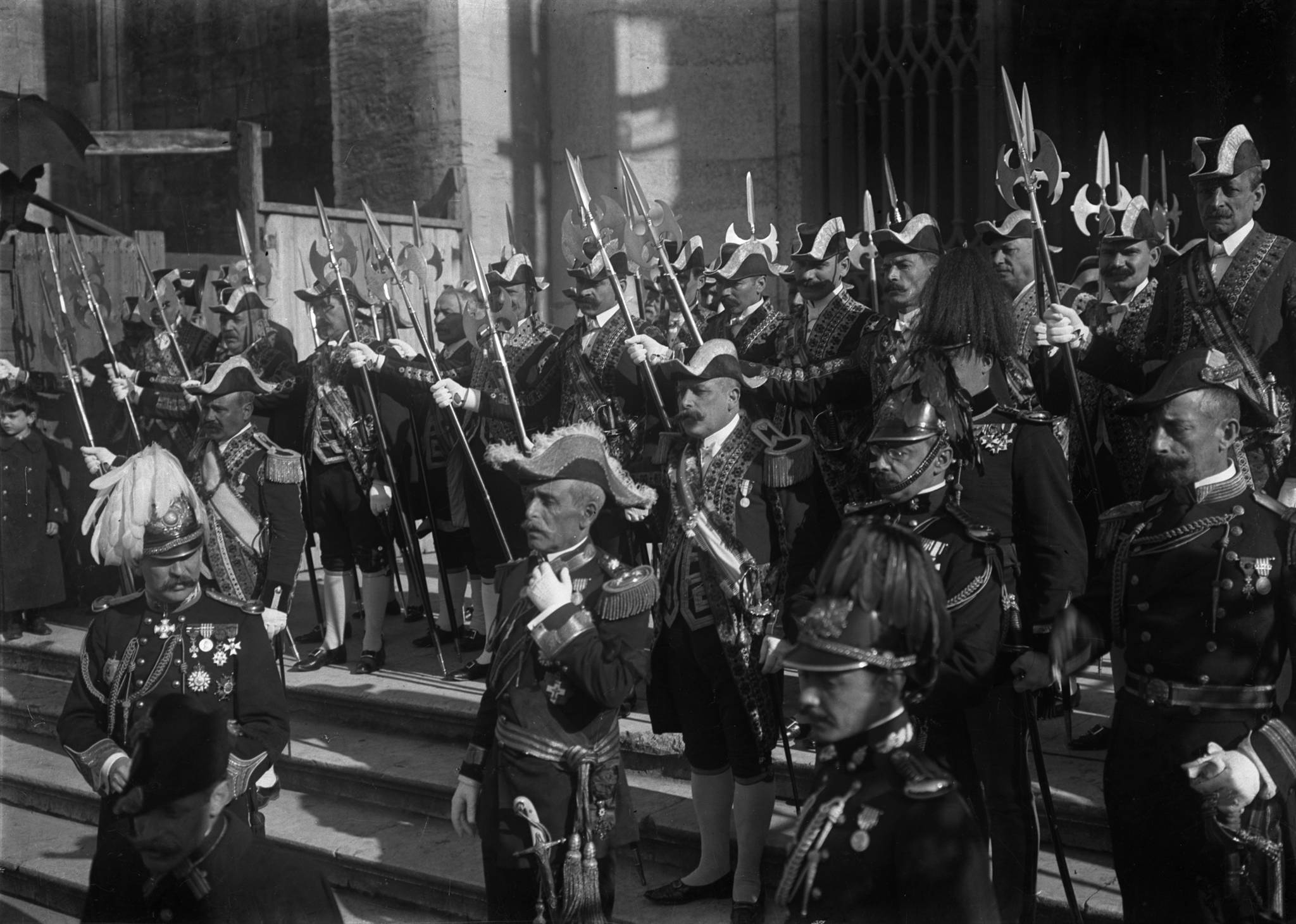
The Archers Guard waiting for King Manuel II in the State opening of the Portuguese Parliament

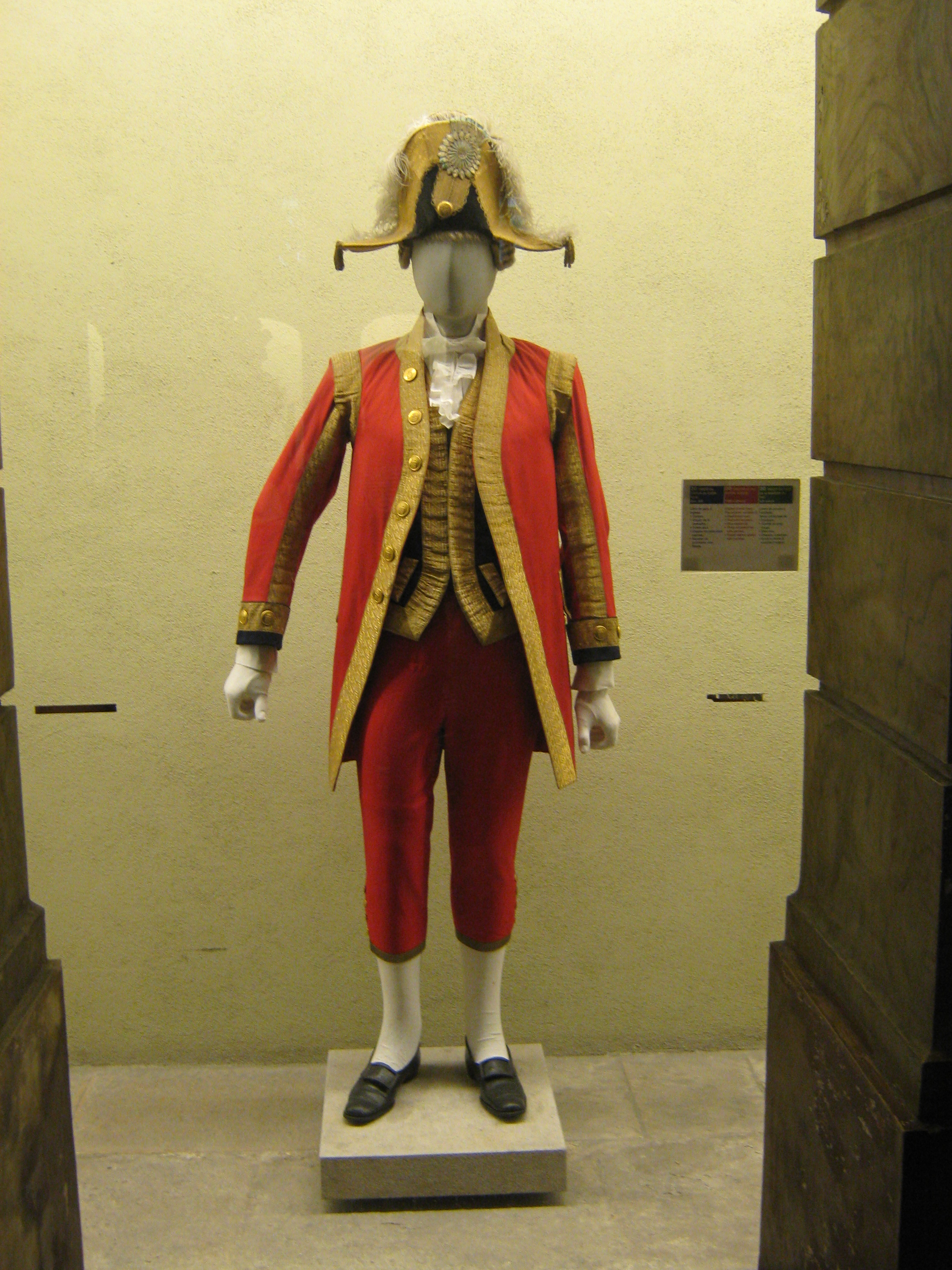
Uniform of an Archer Guard in exhibition at the National Coach Museum

== See also ==
- Royal guard
- Portuguese Marines
- 2nd Lancers Regiment (Portugal)
- Imperial Guard of the Archers of the Empire of Brazil
