= Imperial Navy =

Imperial Navy may refer to:

== Navies ==
=== In Asia ===
- Imperial Chinese Navy 1875–1912
- Imperial Japanese Navy 1868–1945
- Manchukuo Imperial Navy 1932–1939
- Imperial Iranian Navy 1932–1979

=== In Europe ===
- Austro-Hungarian Navy 1867–1918
- Imperial German Navy 1872–1918
- Ottoman Navy 1323-1922
- Imperial Russian Navy 1696–1917

=== Elsewhere ===
- Imperial Brazilian Navy 1822–1889

== Arts and entertainment ==
- Imperial Navy (film), a 1981 Japanese film
- Imperial Navy (Star Wars), a fictional force

== See also ==
- Imperial Army (disambiguation)
- Royal Navy (disambiguation)
