= Sailing (sport) =

Amateur or professional competitive sport

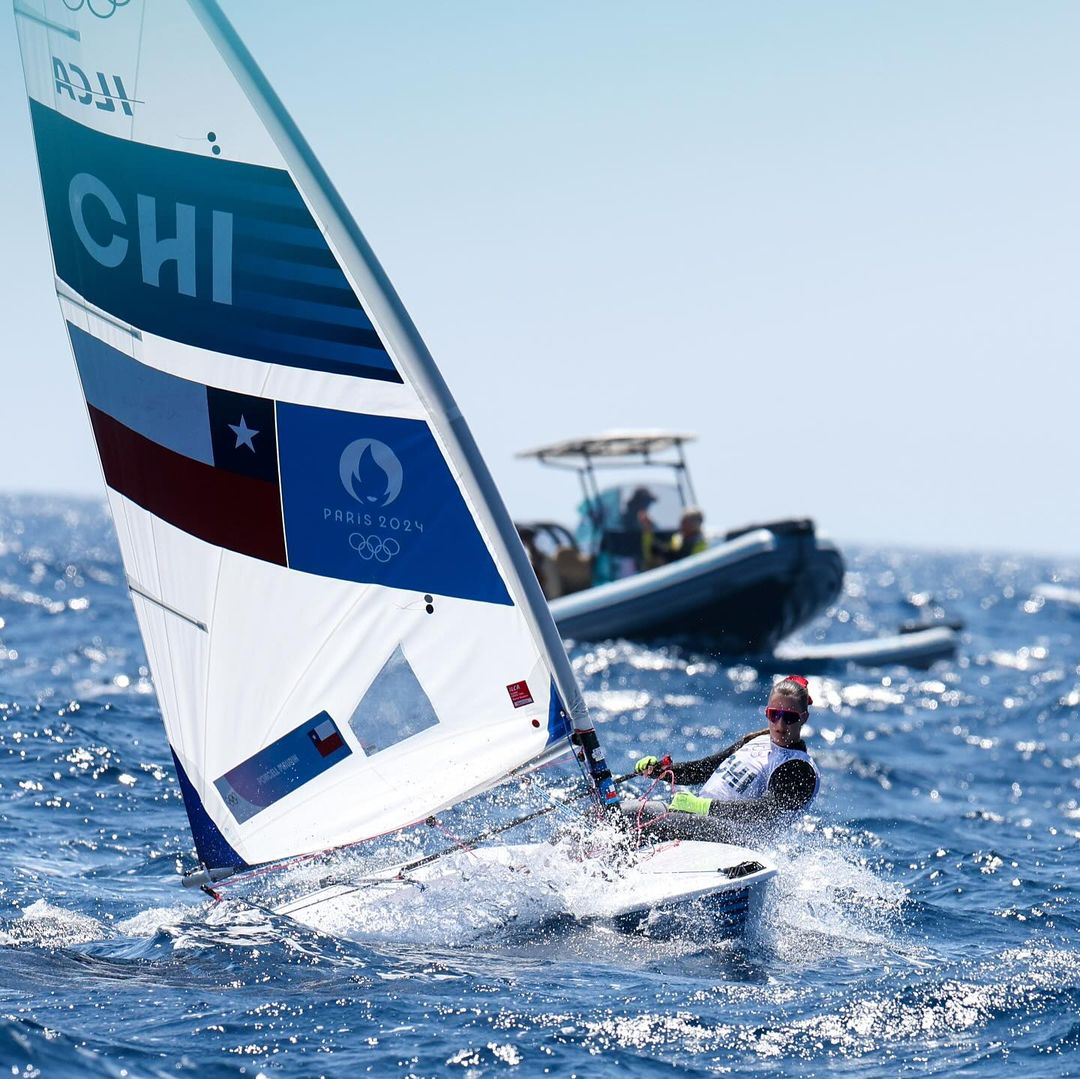
- Sailor María José Poncell at the 2024 Summer Olympics
- Highest governing body: World Sailing
- Nicknames: Sailboat racing
- First played: 18th century

Characteristics
- Contact: No
- Mixed-sex: Mixed
- Type: Outdoor

Presence
- Olympic: 1900, 1908–present
- Paralympic: Demonstration sport in 1996, official sport from 2000-2016

Pictogram for Sailing at the Summer Olympics

The sport of sailing involves a variety of competitive sailing formats that are sanctioned through various sailing federations and yacht clubs. Racing disciplines include matches within a fleet of sailing craft, between a pair thereof or among teams. Additionally, there are specialized competitions that include setting speed records. Racing formats include both closed courses and point-to-point contests; they may be in sheltered waters, along coasts, or on the open ocean. Most competitions are held within defined classes or ratings that either entail one type of sailing craft to ensure a contest primarily of skill or rating the sailing craft to create classifications or handicaps.

On the water, a sailing competition among multiple vessels is called a regatta. A regatta consists of multiple individual races. The boat crew that performs best over the series of races is the overall winner. There is a broad variety of races and of sailboats used for racing, from large yacht to dinghy racing. Much racing is done around buoys or similar marks in protected waters, while some longer offshore races cross open water. Boats used for racing include small dinghies, catamarans, boats designed primarily for cruising, and purpose-built raceboats. The Racing Rules of Sailing govern the conduct of yacht racing, windsurfing, kitesurfing, model boat racing, dinghy racing, and virtually any other form of racing around a course with more than one vessel while powered by the wind.

The Barcolana regatta of the Italian yacht club Società Velica di Barcola e Grignano is currently the Guinness World Record holder as the "largest sailing race" with 2,689 boats and over 16,000 sailors at the starting line.

== Membership ==
=== International federation ===
The International Olympic Committee recognizes World Sailing (WS) as the world governing body for the sport of sailing yacht racing. WS was formed in 1904 as the International Yacht Racing Union and then called the International Sailing Federation until rebranding 2014.

=== Yacht clubs ===
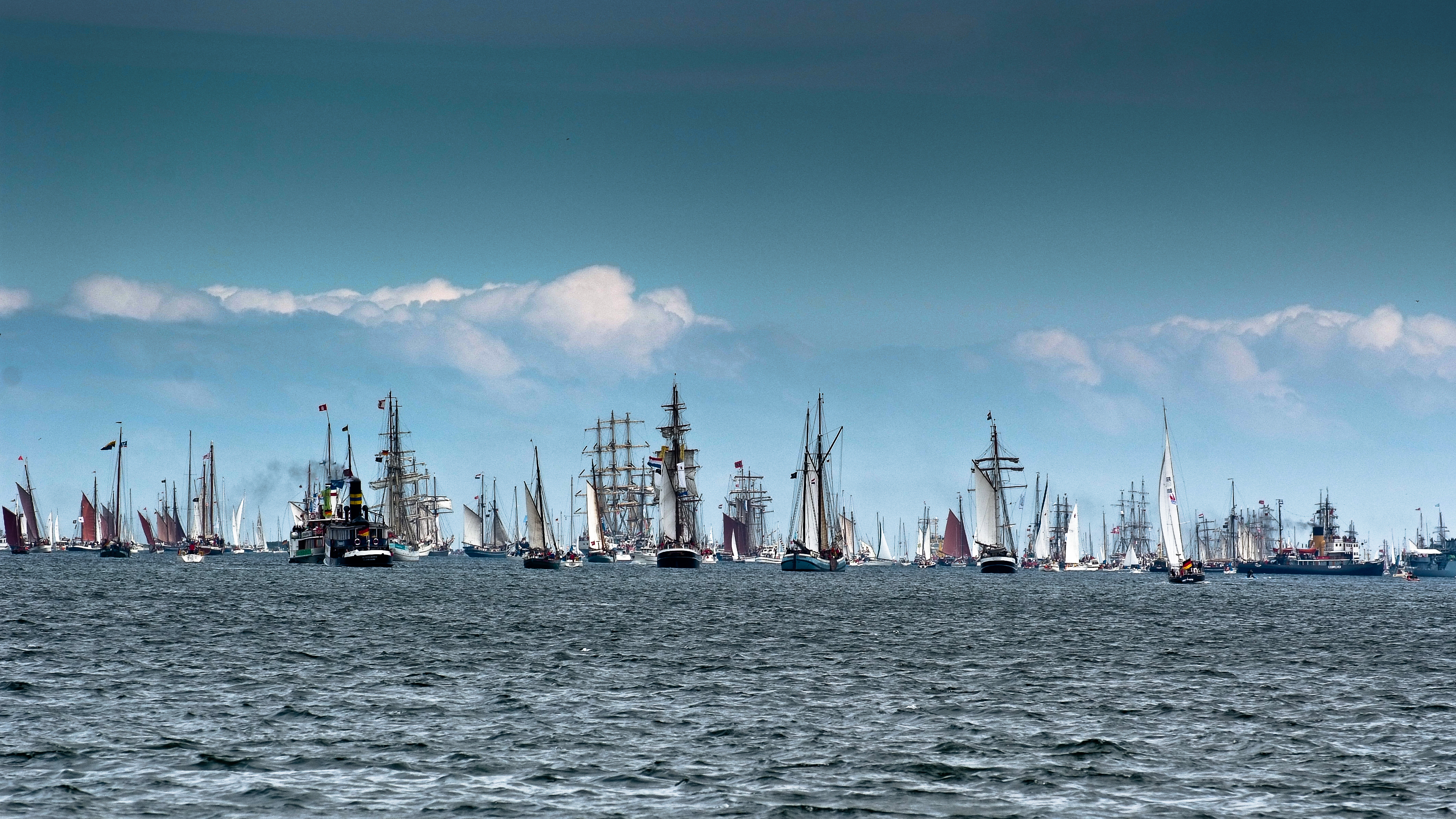
Windjammer Parade at Kiel Week in Germany, the world's biggest regatta and sailing event

Many town yacht clubs maintain their own racing teams for both juniors and adults. Often several yacht clubs will get together to hold events that can include more than 100 entered boats per race making up the regatta. Often both adults and juniors sail the same classes of boat.

== Event disciplines ==
=== Fleet racing ===
Fleet races can have anywhere from four boats to hundreds in a race. A regatta must comprise at least three races to be counted. Each boat's ranking in each race is added to compile a final score. The lowest scorer wins.

=== Match racing ===
In match racing only two boats compete against each other. The best known competition of this type is the America's Cup. The tactics involved in match racing are different from those of other races, because the objective is merely to arrive at the finish line before the opponent rather than as fast as possible. The tactics involved at the start are also special.

=== Team racing ===
Sailboats maneuver for position during the starting sequence of a team-sailing match race

Team racing is most often between two teams of three boats each. It involves similar technique to match racing but has the added dimension that it is the overall scoring of the race that matters. In three-on-three team racing, this means that the team that scores ten or less points wins. For this reason, many tactics are used to advance teammates to make stable combinations for winning. The stable combinations most commonly sought are "Play one", which is 1-2-anything, "Play two" or 2-3-4, and "Play 4", a 1-4-5 combination. These are generally regarded as the best setups to win and the hardest for the opposing team to play offense against.

=== Speed Sailing ===
Is managed by World Speed Sailing Record Council

=== Wave riding ===
Is common to board sports.

=== Others ===
Both windsurfing and kiteboarding are experimenting with new formats.

== Common race formats ==
=== Short course racing ===
A 1D35 near the race committee boat, Humber Bay, Toronto, Ontario

Harbor or buoy races are conducted in protected waters, and are quite short, usually taking anywhere from a few minutes to a few hours. All sorts of sailing craft are used for these races, including keel-boats of all sizes, as well as dinghies, trailer sailors, catamarans, skiffs, sailboards, and other small craft.

This kind of race is most commonly run over one or more laps of a triangular course marked by a number of buoys. The course starts from an imaginary line drawn from a 'committee boat' to the designated 'starting' buoy or 'pin'. A number of warning signals are given telling the crews exactly how long until the race starts. The aim of each crew is to cross the start line at full speed exactly as the race starts. A course generally involves tacking upwind to a 'windward' marker or buoy. Then bearing away onto a downwind leg to a second jibe marker. Next another jibe on a second downwind leg to the last mark which is called the 'downwind mark' (or 'leeward mark'). At this mark the boats turn into wind once again to tack to the finish line. Navigating these rapid directional changes requires intense synchronisation between crew members, as split-second timing during tacks and jibes is critical to maintaining momentum and capitalising on wind shifts.

The most famous and longest running of these events are:

- Olympic Games
- America's Cup
- Cowes Week
- Mug Race

=== Coastal/Inshore racing ===
Inshore racing is yacht racing not in protected waters but along and generally within sight of land or from land to nearby islands, as distinct from offshore racing across open water and oceans. The duration of races may be daylight only, overnight or passage races of several days. Some races, such as the Swiftsure Yacht Race, are actually a group of inshore races of various distances along overlapping courses to allow for different classes and skills. Depending on location, stability and safety equipment requirements will be more extensive than for harbor racing, but less so than for offshore racing. Different levels of requirement for navigation, sleeping cooking and water storage also apply.

=== Offshore racing ===
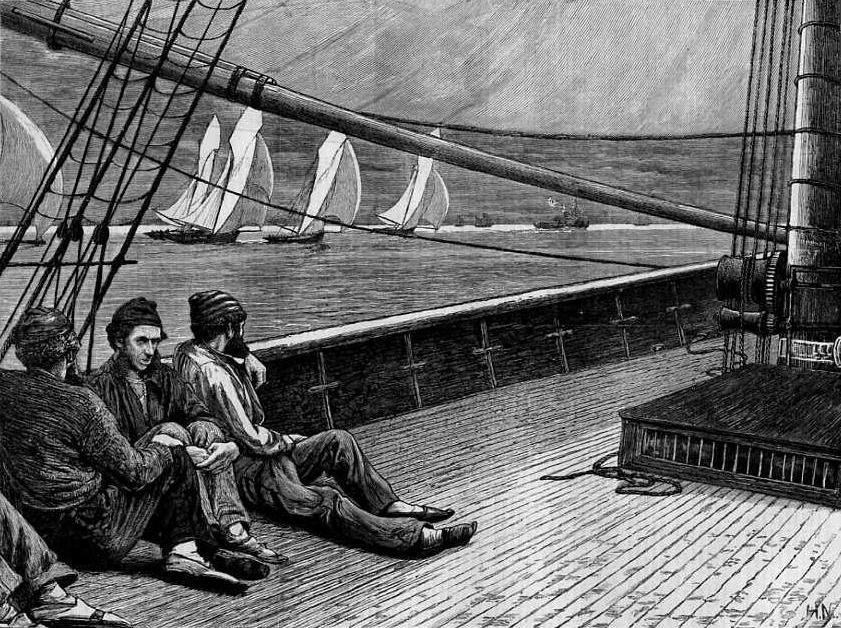
The Yacht Race, an 1872 print

Offshore yacht races are held over long distances and in open water; such races usually last for at least a number of hours. The longest offshore races involve a circumnavigation of the world.

Some of the most famous offshore races are as follows

- Sydney to Hobart Yacht Race
- OSTAR (Single-Handed Trans Atlantic Race)
- Transpacific Yacht Race
- Fastnet Race
- Bermuda Race
- Hamilton Island Race Week
- Chicago Yacht Club Race to Mackinac
- Governors Cup
- South Atlantic Race

=== Oceanic racing ===
Several fully crewed round-the-world races are held, including:

- The Ocean Race (formerly known as the Whitbread Round the World Race and the Volvo Ocean Race)
- Global Challenge
- Clipper Round the World Yacht Race

South African yacht clubs organise the South Atlantic Race (the former Cape to Rio race), the Governor's Cup from Cape Town to St. Helena Island, and a race between Durban and Mauritius.

Single-handed ocean yacht racing began with the race across the Atlantic Ocean by William Albert Andrews and Josiah W. Lawlor in 1891; however, the first regular single-handed ocean race was the Single-Handed Trans-Atlantic Race, first held in 1960. The first round-the-world yacht race was the Sunday Times Golden Globe Race of 1968–1969, which was also a single-handed race with the only winner, Robin Knox-Johnston on Suhaili; this inspired the present-day Velux 5 Oceans Race (formerly the BOC Challenge / Around Alone) and the Vendée Globe. Single-handed racing has seen a great boom in popularity in recent years.

There is some controversy about the legality of sailing single-handed over long distances, as the navigation rules require "that every vessel shall at all times maintain a proper lookout..."; single-handed sailors can only keep a sporadic lookout, due to the need to sleep, tend to navigation, etc.

=== Other races ===
Certain races do not fit in the above categories. One such is the Three peaks yacht race in the UK which is a team competition involving sailing, cycling and running.

== Classes and ratings ==
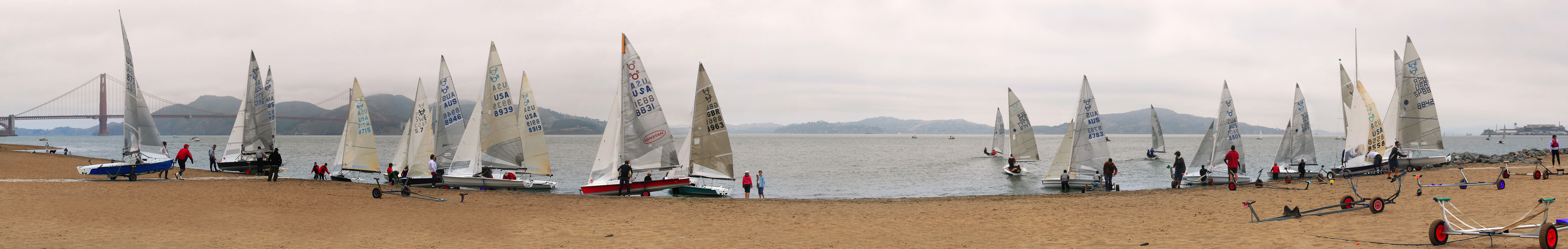
Preparation for a dinghy race (SAP 505 World Championship). The 5O5 (pronounced five-oh-five) is named for its 5.05 metres (16.6 ft) length.

Many design factors have a large impact on the speed at which a boat can complete a course, including the size of a boat's sails, its length, and the weight and shape of its hull. Because of these differences, it can be difficult to compare the skills of the sailors in a race if they are sailing very different boats. For most forms of yacht racing, one of two solutions to this problem are used: either all boats are required to race on a first to finish basis (these groups of boats are called classes), or a handicapping system is used which implements correction factors.

=== Manufacturer controlled classes ===
Each class has a detailed set of specifications that must be met for the boat to be considered a member of that class. Some classes (e.g.the Laser) have very tight specifications ensuring that there is virtually no difference between the boats (except for age) - these classes are sometimes called strict one-design.

In one-design racing all boats must conform to the same standard, the class rules, thus emphasizing the skill of the skipper and crew rather than having the results depend on equipment superiority.

This kind of class is most commonly with a brand, as occurs with Laser Performance, RS Sailing, Melges and J/Boats.

=== Measurement controlled classes ===
Popular International Classes include the Optimist, 470, Snipe and Etchells.

=== Measurement classes box rule ===
A box rule specifies a maximum overall size for boats in the class, as well as features such as stability. Competitors in these classes are then free to enter their own boat designs, as long as they do not exceed the box rule. No handicap is then applied.

- International One Metre
- Class 40
- TP 52
- Open 60

=== Measurement development classes ===
- Moth
- International 14

=== Measurement formula-based classes ===
A construction class is based on a formula or set of restrictions which the boat's measurements must fit to be accepted to the class. Resulting boats are all unique, yet (ideally) relatively close in size and performance. Perhaps the most popular and enduring construction formula is The Metre Rule, around which several still popular classes were designed. With the 12 Metre being the most famous due to its involvement in the America's Cup.

=== Handicap racing ===
When all the yachts in a race are not members of the same class, then a handicap is used to adjust the times of boats. The handicap attempts to specify a "normal" speed for each boat, usually based either on measurements taken of the boat, or on the past record of that kind of boat. Each boat is timed over the specified course. After it has finished, the handicap is used to adjust each boat's finishing time. The results are based on this sum.

Popular handicapping systems include

- ORCi
- ORC Club
- IRC (Sailing)
- PHRF
- Portsmouth Yardstick

Earlier popular rating systems include IOR and IMS.

== Gender criteria ==
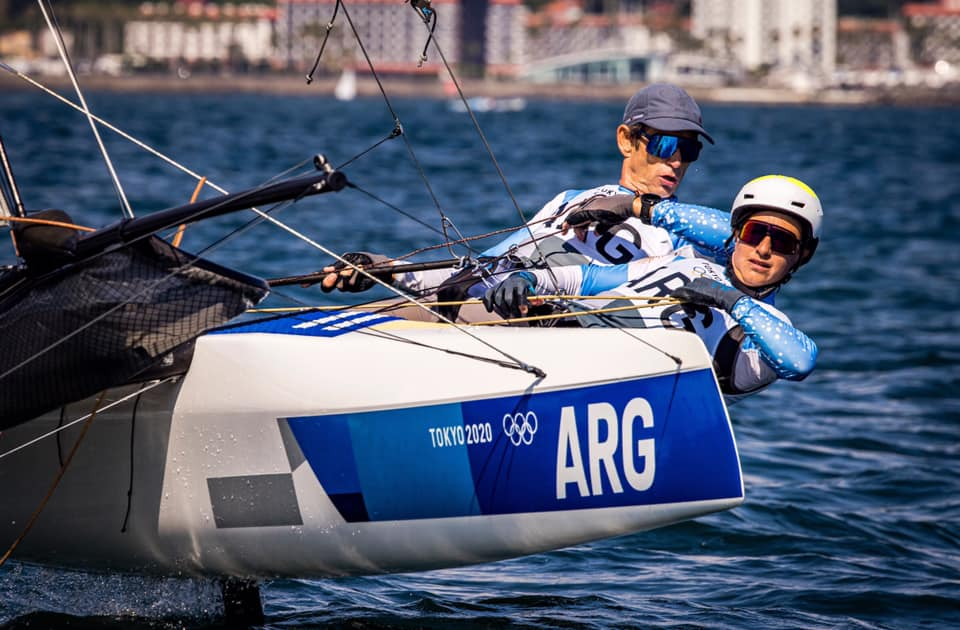
The Nacra 17 events at the Summer Olympics have been mixed gender since their introduction in 2016

The majority of sailing events are "open" events in which males and females compete together on equal terms either as individuals or part of team. Sailing has had female only World Championships since the 1970s to encourage participation and now hosts more than 30 such World Championship titles each year. For the 2016 Olympics in Rio, compulsory mixed gender in the event were added for the first time.

== Additional criteria ==
In addition the following criteria are sometimes applied to events:

- Age
- Nationality
- Disabled Classification
- Sailor Classification

== See also ==
- Dinghy racing
- Former Olympic sailing classes
- Olympic sailing classes
- Retired after finishing
