= Royal Armed Forces =

Royal Armed Forces may refer to:

- Royal Brunei Armed Forces
- Royal Burmese Armed Forces
- Royal Cambodian Armed Forces
- Royal Moroccan Armed Forces
- Royal Thai Armed Forces

== See also ==
- Royal Army (disambiguation)
