= Goodspeed Airport =

Goodspeed Airport & Seaplane Base
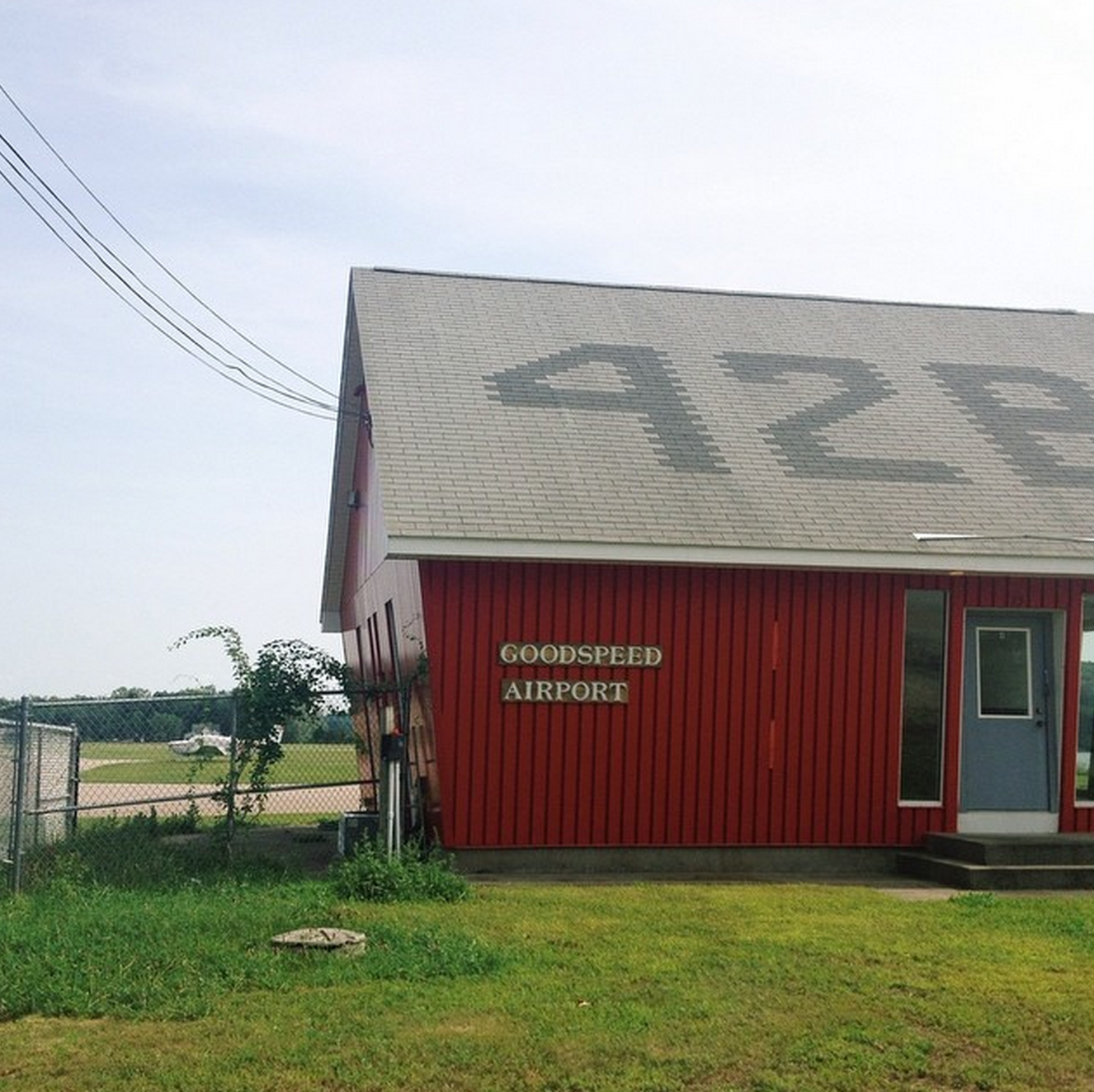
- IATA: none; ICAO: none; FAA LID: 42B

Summary
- Airport type: Public-use, privately-owned
- Owner: New England Airport Associates, LLC
- Serves: East Haddam
- Location: Connecticut
- Elevation AMSL: 9 ft (2.7 m)
- Coordinates: 41°26′44″N 72°27′20″W
- Website: goodspeedairport.com

Map
- Interactive map of Goodspeed Airport & Seaplane Base

Runways
| Direction | Length | | Surface |
| Direction | ft | m | Surface |
|---|---|---|---|
| 14/32 | 2,120 | 646 | Asphalt |
| 16W/34W | 4,500 | 1,372 | Water |

Statistics (2010)
- Aircraft operations: 6,188
- Based aircraft: 33
- Source: Federal Aviation Administration

Goodspeed Airport (FAA LID: 42B) is located in East Haddam, Connecticut, United States. It has been under new ownership with the support of the Recreational Aviation Foundation since November 2020. The new owners plan to revitalize the airport and encourage a vibrant general aviation community.

== Facilities and aircraft ==
Goodspeed Airport is situated 1 mile southeast of the central business district, and contains two runways. The longest runway, 16/34, is water measuring 4,500 x 1,000 ft (1372 x 305 m). A second runway, 14/32, paved with asphalt, measures 2,120 x 50 ft (646 x 15 m).

The airport's other facilities include docks for seaplanes, a boat ramp for launching straight floatplanes, a small terminal building that houses two businesses, and 36 hangars of a variety of sizes.

The airport has been featured in videos and articles by a number of prominent aviation figures and organizations, including Matt Guthmiller and AOPA, mainly centering on its somewhat unusual position and approaches, and its short paved runway, as well as the nearby Goodspeed Opera House and the town of East Haddam.

For the 12-month period ending April 30, 2010, the airport had 6,188 aircraft operations, an average of 119 per week: 80% local general aviation, and 19% transient general aviation. At that time there were 33 aircraft based at this airport: 87% single-engine and 4% multi-engine, and 9% ultra-light.

The largest aircraft to ever land at Goodspeed Airport is the Douglas C-47 "Placid Lassie," which has been brought in by the Tunison Foundation several times as a visiting exhibit.

== Revitalization Plan ==
In the fall of 2020, Goodspeed Airport was acquired for $891,000 by New England Airport Associates, LLC, a partnership between Eric Zipkin and Bill McEnery, funded in part by the Recreational Aviation Foundation, from Timothy Mellon, who purchased the airport in 1999 for $2.33 million. Both Zipkin and McEnery are pilots and aircraft owners who had previously based aircraft at the airport; McEnery owns the Pedal Power line of bicycle shops, while Zipkin is the founder of Tradewind Aviation. Initial plans to revitalize the airport included making Avgas available again, as well as installing previously permitted seaplane docks. Zipkin and McEnery hope that the airport will see renewed aviation activity. Property development is limited by a conservation easement, so major structural changes to the airport will not occur.

As of October 2023, the airport has attracted renewed community interest, including hosting various local events, and now has both a seaplane flight school (Goodspeed Seaplane) and maintenance facility (Goodspeed Aero Craft) on-site. During the summer of 2023, seaplane docks were reinstalled for the first time in decades.

== See also ==
- List of airports in Connecticut
