= Chicken Strip =

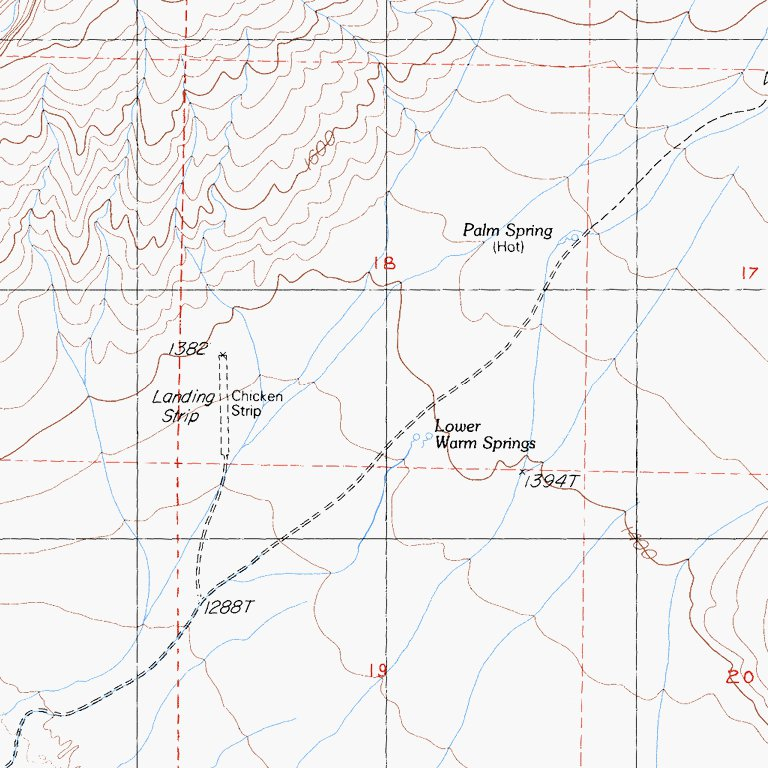
- IATA: none; ICAO: none

Summary
- Airport type: Public (uncharted)
- Owner/Operator: National Park Service
- Location: Death Valley National Park
- Elevation AMSL: 1,360 ft / 415 m
- Coordinates: 36°48′24″N 117°46′54″W

Map
- Location of airport in California Chicken Strip (the United States)

Runways
Direction	Length		Surface
Direction	ft	m	Surface
~18/36	1,350	411	Dirt

Saline Valley Warm Springs Airfield, commonly known as the Chicken Strip, is a non-towered dirt airstrip not depicted on an FAA sectional chart. The airstrip provides general aviation fly-in access to the Saline Valley hot springs in Death Valley National Park. The closest airport to the airstrip is Lone Pine Airport, 20 miles (17 nmi; 32 km) to the southwest, and the closest airport with regular airline service is Fresno Yosemite International Airport, 107 miles (93 nmi; 172 km) to the west.

Chicken Strip was built in the 1960s to provide quicker access to the nearby hot springs, sometimes called the warm springs, that are a short walking distance away. Without the airport the only other access to the Saline Valley hot springs is an arduous, 40 miles (64 km) dirt road that can take three to four hours to complete.

== History ==
On August 7, 2011 the National Park Service (NPS) closed Chicken Strip due to safety concerns. The Recreational Aviation Foundation (RAF) worked with the NPS to repair the strip. Volunteers from the RAF and BackcountryPilot.org worked to restore Chicken Strip to the satisfaction of the NPS. Chicken Strip reopened to the public on October 15, 2011.

In July 2016, Chicken Strip closed because the airstrip had become too rough from storm damage to safely land on. With quick action from RAF volunteers, the airstrip reopened in September 2016.

In 2018 the NPS issued a notice of proposed rulemaking to designate the Saline Valley Warm Springs Airfield as a location "available for the operation of aircraft" and to be charted on a sectional chart and be entered in to the FAA registrar.

On August 19, 2019, the NPS issued an official authorization.

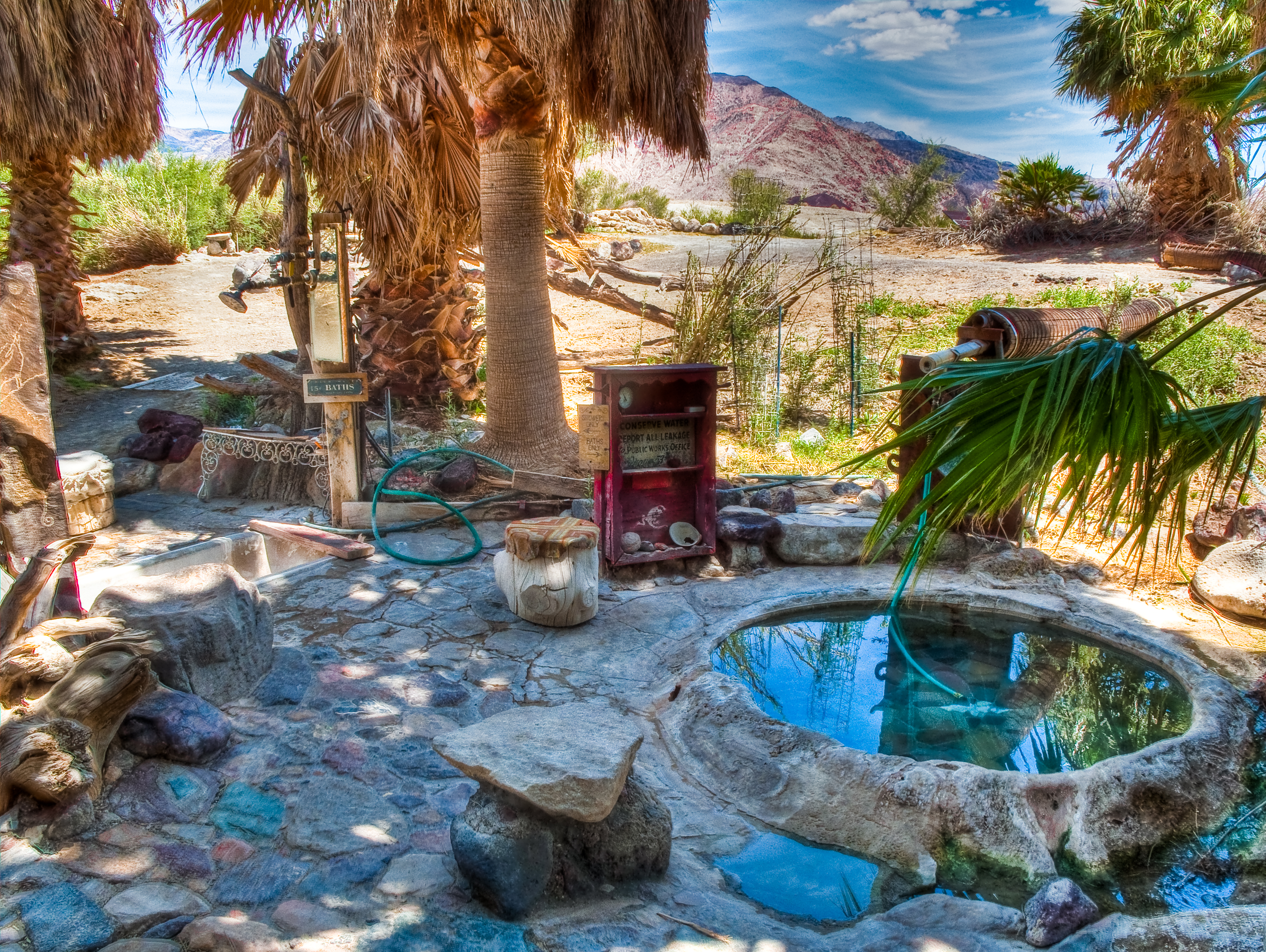
Saline Valley Hot Springs

== Facilities ==
Chicken Strip is at an elevation of 1,360 ft (410 m) above mean sea level. It has one, slightly up-sloping, dirt runway:

- Runway headings are approximately 18/36 measuring 1,350 x ~30 ft (411 x ~9 m).
