= Retired after finishing =

Sailing race term

Retired after finishing is a term used in sailing racing when a boat retires after finishing a race. This means that the sailor only realized at the end of the race that they have broken a rule. Since the consequences of the infringed rule can no longer be applied, the sailors receive the rank "RAF", or retired after finish. This holds the same consequences as receiving a "DNF"; usually a score of the number of boats in the fleet plus one. Such errors may include missing a mark, rounding to the wrong side, ignoring a protest from another boat, etc.

The scoring abbreviations are defined in Appendix A11 of the Racing Rules of Sailing. The term is now obsolete as it changed in 2013 to "RET" or Retired. The meaning is the same as RAF except that it also covers retirement before finishing.
