= Recreational Aviation Foundation =

- Abbreviation: RAF
- Formation: 2003; 23 years ago
- Founder: Chuck Jarecki
- Type: Charitable organization (IRS exemption status): 501(c)(3)
- Purpose: Aviation, airport preservation
- Headquarters: Bozeman, Montana, United States
- Website: theraf.org

The Recreational Aviation Foundation (RAF) is a US charitable organization advocating for the preservation and creation of airstrips for recreational aviation. The Recreational Aviation Foundation uses tax-deductible donations to identify new areas for airstrips, assists in funding the construction of new airstrips, and promotes recreational aviation and airstrips as a legitimate usage of public land to secure further funding. The Recreational Aviation Foundation maintains liaisons and ambassadors in most U.S. states to help lead projects at the local level.

== History ==
Formed in 2003, in conjunction with the United States Forest Service, the RAF worked from 2003 to 2010 to open a new airstrip, the Russian Flat Airstrip (FAA LID: M42), earning the Flying (magazine) Editors' Choice Awards for industry innovation in 2011. RAF volunteers maintain Chicken Strip in Death Valley National Park, having repaired the airstrip in both 2011 and 2016.

The RAF made possible the passing of H.Res.1473 in 2010 that "placed value of recreational aviation and backcountry airstrips" for the public to use and on public land. "The Resolution originated with the Recreational Aviation Foundation Board of Directors after discussions with the Congressmen in Washington, DC." The RAF worked with the Bureau of Land Management along with volunteers to help preserve Upper Missouri River Breaks National Monument airstrips.

In 2020, RAF funding assisted in the acquisition of Goodspeed Airport in eastern Connecticut by a consortium of area pilots, intending to revitalize the airport and bring a greater aviation community to the airport and seaplane base.

== See also ==
- Aircraft Owners and Pilots Association
- Experimental Aircraft Association
