= Saline Valley =

Valley in Mojave Desert, California

Coordinates: 36.75°N 117.81°W

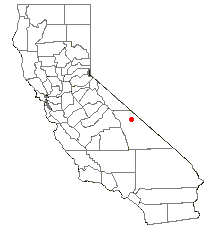
Location of Saline Valley within California

Saline Valley is a large, deep, and arid graben, about 27 miles (43 km) in length, in the northern Mojave Desert of California, a narrow, northwest–southeast-trending tectonic sink defined by fault-block mountains. Most of it became a part of Death Valley National Park when the park was expanded in 1994. This area had previously been administered by the Bureau of Land Management. It is located northwest of Death Valley proper, south of Eureka Valley, and east of the Owens Valley. The valley's lowest elevations are about 1,000 ft (300 m) and it lies in the rain shadow of the 14,000 ft (4,300 m) Sierra Nevada range, plus the 11,000 ft (3,400 m) Inyo Mountains bordering the valley on the west.

== Natural features ==
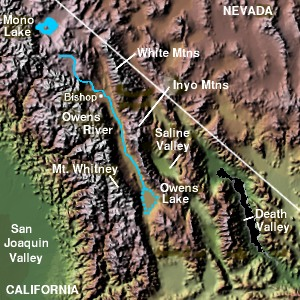
Saline Valley

A large dry lake occupies the center of the valley. The west end of the lake supports a salt marsh, which contains a variety of plant and animal life. The marsh is fed by a perennial stream from Hunter Canyon. North of the lake is a large area of low and sweeping sand dunes.

There are a number of hot springs in the northeast corner of the valley. The water temperature at the source of these springs averages at 107 °F (42 °C). Saline Valley's three main warm springs are reached by a primary road known as the Warm Springs Road or Painted Rock Road.

Lower Warm Springs is the largest, most developed, and most popular dispersed camping area. Palm Spring is smaller and less crowded with great views of Saline Valley and the source feeds two tubs known as Wizard Pool and Volcano Pool. Upper Warm Spring, the smallest and least disturbed of the main springs, is a deep pool of lukewarm azure water surrounded by cattail, arrow-weed, and grasses, in full view of the Saline Range.

Saline Valley is a closed or endorheic basin. If filled with water it would be over 4,000 feet (1,200 m) deep, form a lake with a surface area of roughly 500 square miles (1,300 km^{2}), and hold approximately 500,000,000 acre⋅ft (620 km^{3}) of water.

== History ==
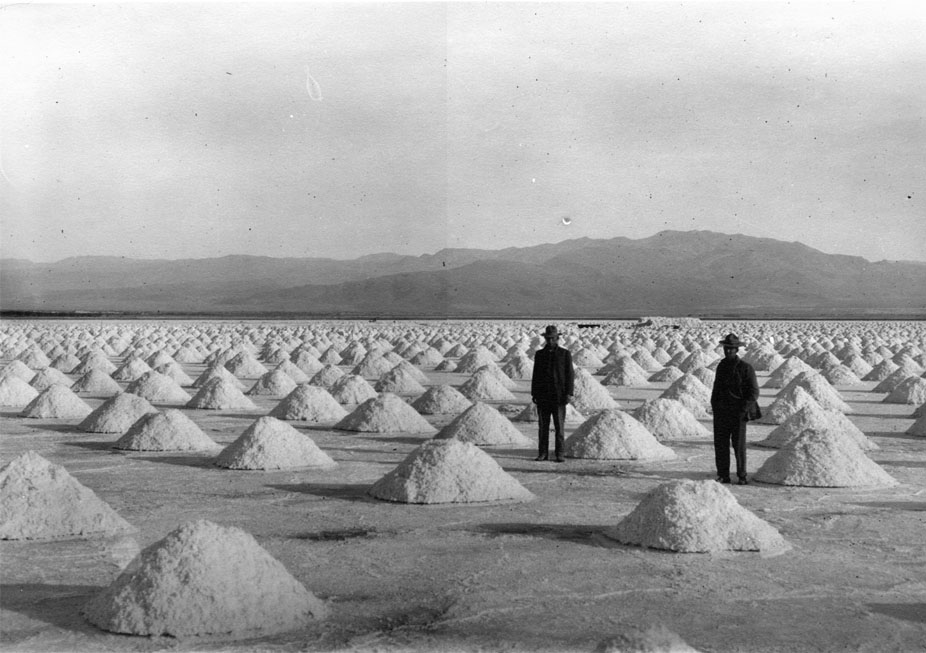
Piles of harvested salt. Miles Bolser, H.J.R., c. 1912, Saline Valley

Saline Valley was inhabited by the Ko'ongkatün Band of Timbisha Shoshone (also known as Panamint or Koso). One of their principal villages was known as Ko'on and located in Saline Valley, therefore the valley was named after the village and known as Ko'ongkatün (Ko'on + kantün - "possessing, characterized by" the village Ko'on) or simply Ko'on. The Timbisha Shoshone living at Ko'on were called Ko'ontsi (″People of the village Ko'on"). The village was abandoned in the early 20th century and the inhabitants moved to Darwin, California.

Saline Valley was a significant mineral source in the late 19th and early 20th centuries. The Conn and Trudo Borax Company mined borax from the salt marsh from 1874 to 1895. The remains of this site can be seen today as a few shallow pits near Saline Valley Road. Salt mining began in 1903 at the south end of the lake, and continued into the 1930s.

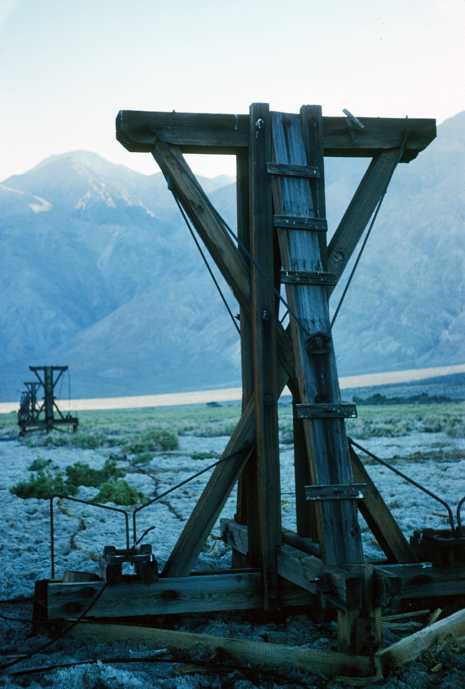
Salt tram looking towards White Mountains, 1952

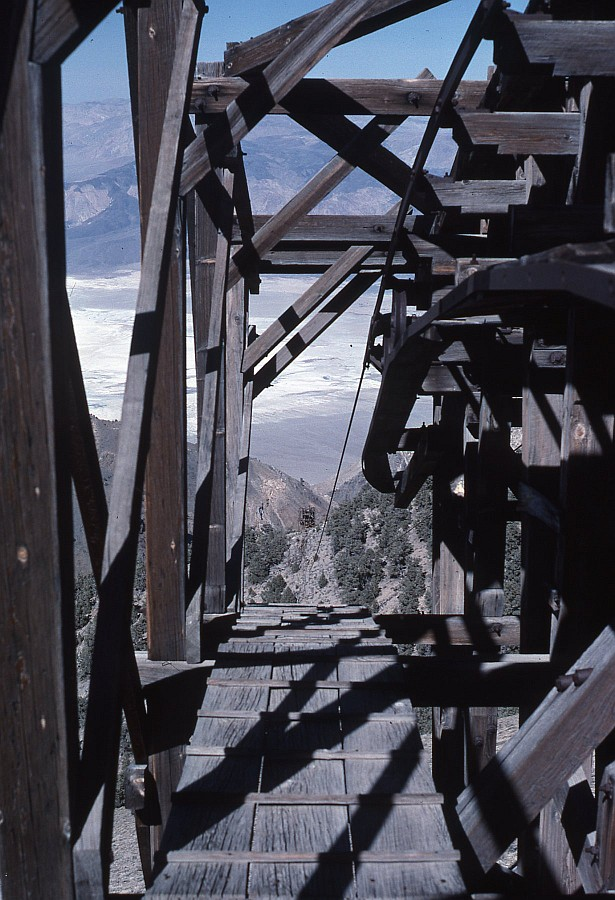
Salt tram summit station in 1989

An electric aerial tram was constructed in 1911 to carry the salt 14 miles (23 km) over the Inyo Mountains to a terminus northeast of Keeler, California in the Owens Valley. It operated sporadically from 1913 to 1936, but ultimately proved to be too expensive to run. The tram, which was placed on the National Register of Historic Places in 1973, was the steepest ever constructed in the United States. It rose from an elevation of 1,100 feet (340 m) in Saline Valley to 8,500 feet (2,600 m) over the mountains, and then down to 3,600 feet (1,100 m). Route was south from Salt Lake to Daisy Canyon then southwest and terminated at the Southern Pacific RR between Dolomite and Swansea. In recent years it has been badly damaged by vandals.

As early as the 1960s, the hot springs in the valley became popular among nudists, and were eventually improved by volunteer labor, to include concrete tubs, a shower, a sink, and three outhouses (which the Park Service later replaced with concrete-lined latrines). For improved access, two airstrips were built, the "Chicken Strip" and "Tail-Dragger Strip" (the latter is now closed).

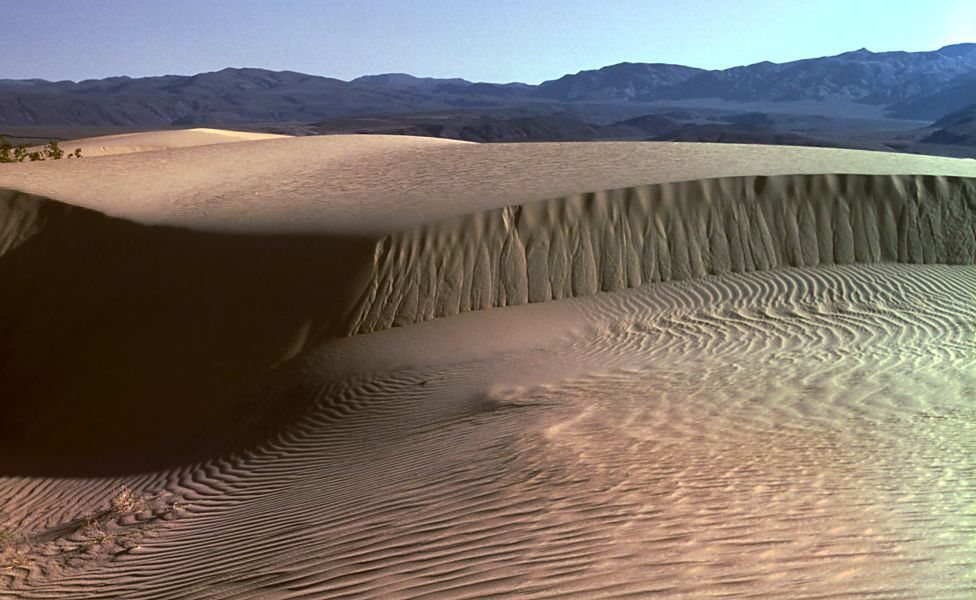
"The Dunes" of Saline Valley, California

The Saline Valley Warm Springs, as they are called, have become controversial in recent years. The improvements would have violated Park Service policy if they had taken place today. There has been compromise so far; a park host is always on duty, visitors are limited to 30 days per year, and the springs do not appear on any official NPS map. The campgrounds retain a clothing-optional policy which the park has taken no official stance on. As stated in the 2019 Saline Valley Warm Springs Management Plan and Environmental Impact Statement, "Public nudity is common at the site, and the plan is silent on this topic. Public nudity is not against Federal regulations, but lewd behavior is."

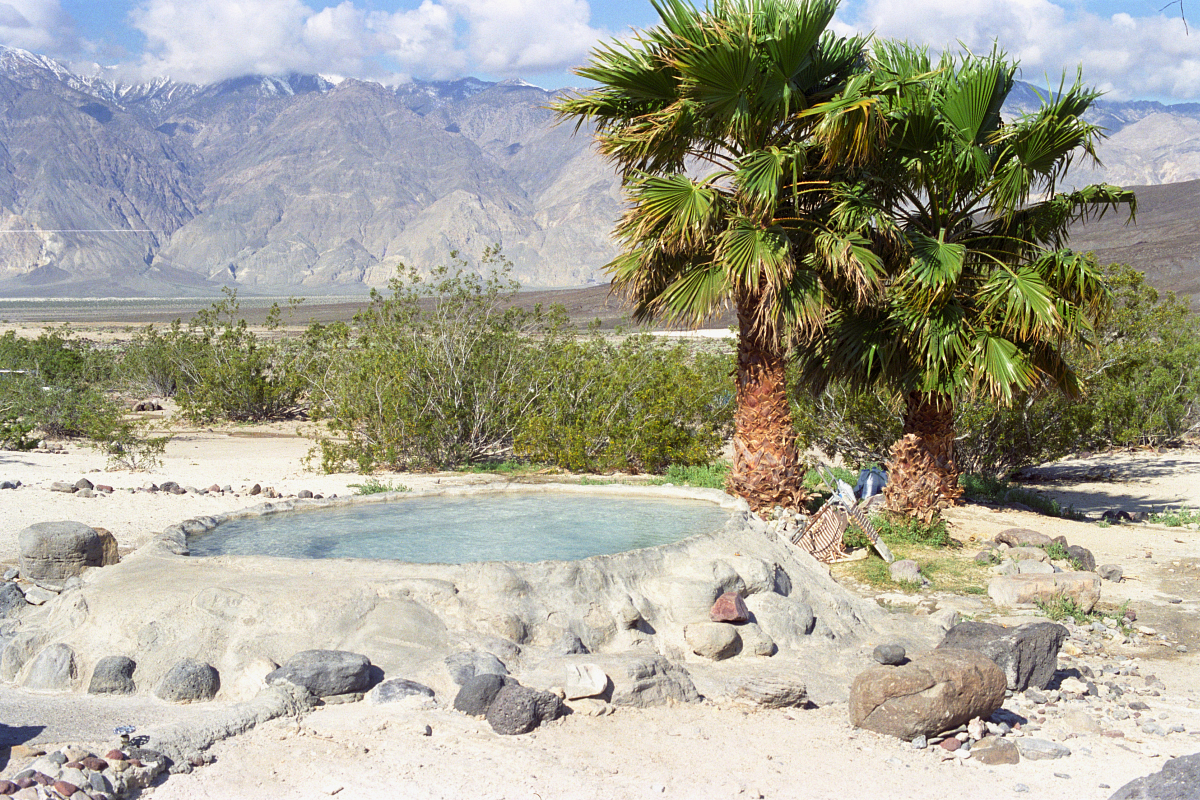
Palm Spring

There are 3 sections of springs, the upper, middle and lower springs. The middle and lower springs have been developed with concrete soaking tubs and showers are present. The upper spring is in an undeveloped natural state. In late 2005, seismic activity disturbed the flow of water to the lower springs. The only functional section remaining after that was the middle springs. However, the flow appears to be returning to the lower springs. As of early 2007, flow is estimated to be about 50% of what it was before the earthquake, and is increasing, making both springs functional.

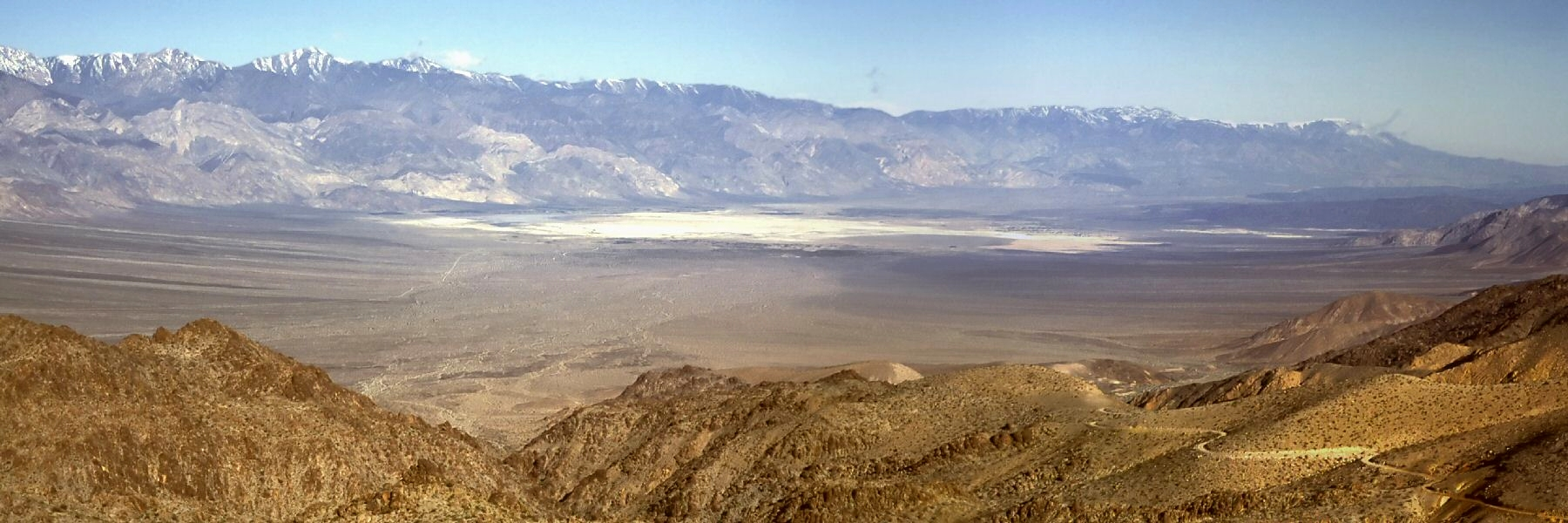
Saline Valley, looking west from a point near the Racetrack Playa in Death Valley National Park

== Military use ==
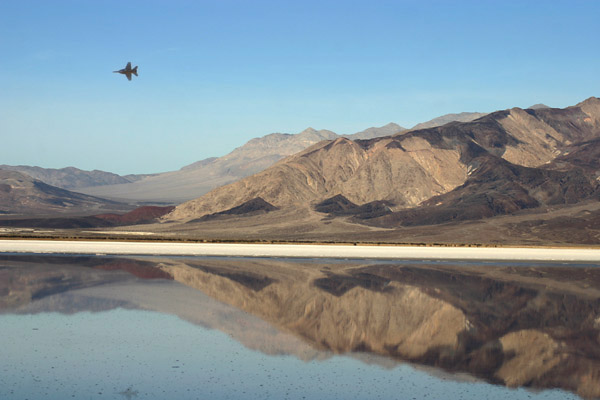
Jets flying at high speeds and low altitudes are prevalent above the valley

Low-flying jet aircraft have long been common in the valley. The airspace over the valley is part of the US military's vast R-2508 Special Use Airspace complex. The Saline Military operations area (MOA) covers the entire valley south to Hunter Mountain from 200' AGL up to FL180 with an ATCAA located over the same area extending from FL180 up to FL600. The airspace is used by military aircraft primarily from Nellis AFB, Edwards AFB, NAWS China Lake, and NAS Lemoore for high and low altitude mission training. Military aircraft utilize radio communications on either 256.8 MHz or 123.95 MHz while operating in the Saline MOA; however, military aircraft throughout the R-2508 complex often use 315.9 MHz when conducting low altitude operations below 1500' AGL.

In December 2003, Edwards Air Force Base completed an environmental assessment for proposed construction and operation of a radar system and microwave repeater facility in the valley.
