= Imperial Army =

An Imperial Army is an army of any empire. However, only some empires in history and in fiction have actually referred to their armies as "The Imperial Army".

== Former Imperial Armies ==
=== In Asia ===
- The Imperial Japanese Army
- The Imperial Chinese Army
- The Manchukuo Imperial Army
- The Imperial Korean Army
- The Imperial Iranian Army

=== In Europe ===
- The Imperial Roman army
- The Byzantine army
- The Ottoman Army
- The Army of the Holy Roman Empire (until 1806)
- The Army of the Holy Roman Emperor (until 1806)
- The Imperial German Army (1871–1918)
- The Imperial Austrian Army (1806–1867)
- The Austro-Hungarian Army (1804–1918)
- The Imperial Russian Army (1721–1917)
- The French Imperial Army (1804–1814 and 1815)
- The Swedish Imperial Army (1611–1721)

=== Elsewhere ===
- The Imperial Brazilian Army

== Fictional ==
- The Imperial Army (Star Wars) of the fictional Galactic Empire in Star Wars
- The Imperial Army of the Archadian Empire in the video game Final Fantasy XII
- The Imperial Army of the Imperium of Man in Warhammer 40000

== See also ==
- Royal Army (disambiguation)
