= Royal Navy (disambiguation) =

The Royal Navy is the United Kingdom's navy.

Royal Navy may also refer to:

== Past ==
=== Europe ===
- Austro-Hungarian Navy or Imperial and Royal War Navy (Kaiserliche und Königliche Kriegsmarine), a navy from 1786 to 1918
- Real Marina ("Real Marina del Regno delle Due Sicilie" or "Armata di Mare di S.M. il Re del Regno delle Due Sicilie"), Royal Sicilian Navy (for the Kingdom of the Two Sicilies, 1816–1861)
- Regia Marina ("Royal Navy"), Italy's navy from 1861 to 1946
- Royal Sardinian Navy, ("Sa Marina Reale Sarda"), for the independent Kingdom of Sardinia, 1720–1861
- Royal Scots Navy, a navy from the Middle Ages to 1707
- Royal Yugoslav Navy (Југословенска краљевска ратна морнарица), a navy from 1918 to 1941

=== South Asia ===
- Royal Indian Navy, a navy from 1612 to 1950

== Present ==
=== Africa ===
- Royal Moroccan Navy (القوات البحرية الملكية المغربية)

=== Asia ===
- Royal Brunei Navy (Tentera Laut Diraja Brunei)
- Royal Malaysian Navy (Tentera Laut DiRaja Malaysia)
- Royal Navy of Oman (البحرية السلطانية العمانية)
- Royal Saudi Naval Forces (القوات البحرية الملكية السعودية)
- Royal Thai Navy (กองทัพเรือ)

=== Europe ===
- Royal Danish Navy (Søværnet)
- Royal Netherlands Navy (Koninklijke Marine)
- Royal Norwegian Navy (Sjøforsvaret)
- Royal Swedish Navy (Kungliga Flottan)

=== North America ===
- Royal Canadian Navy

=== Oceania ===
- Royal Australian Navy
- Royal New Zealand Navy
