= Royal Air Force (disambiguation) =

The Royal Air Force is the United Kingdom's air force.

Royal Air Force may also refer to:

== Air forces ==
=== Past ===
- Regia Aeronautica ("Royal Air Force"), Italy's air force from 1923 to 1946
- Royal Hellenic Air Force, an air force from 1935 to 1973

=== Present ===
Africa

- Royal Moroccan Air Force

Asia

- Royal Air Force of Oman
- Royal Bahraini Air Force
- Royal Brunei Air Force
- Royal Cambodian Air Force
- Royal Jordanian Air Force
- Royal Malaysian Air Force
- Royal Saudi Air Force
- Royal Thai Air Force

Commonwealth realm

- Royal Australian Air Force
- Royal Canadian Air Force
- Royal New Zealand Air Force

Europe

- Royal Danish Air Force
- Royal Netherlands Air Force
- Royal Norwegian Air Force

== Other uses ==
- Real Fuerza Aérea, a Mexican wrestling group
