= California State Route 136 =

Highway in California

State Route 136

- Map of Inyo County in eastern California with SR 136 highlighted in red

Route information
- Maintained by Caltrans
- Length: 18 mi (29 km)

Major junctions
- West end: US 395 at Lone Pine
- East end: SR 190 towards Death Valley

Location
- Country: United States
- State: California
- Counties: Inyo

Highway system
- State highways in California; Interstate; US; State; Scenic; History; Pre‑1964; Unconstructed; Deleted; Freeways
| ← SR 135 | → SR 137 |

State Route 136 (SR 136) is a state highway in the U.S. state of California, running along the northern edge of Owens Lake in Inyo County from U.S. Route 395 in Lone Pine to State Route 190.

== Route description ==
Route 136 is defined in section 436 of the California Streets and Highways Code, and that the highway is "from Route 395 near Lone Pine to Route 190 via Keeler".

The western terminus of SR 136 is at U.S. Route 395 in Lone Pine, near the Lone Pine Airport. SR 136 heads southeast, crossing through the small towns of Swansea and Keeler as it passes along the north shore of the dry lake Owens Lake. The eastern terminus is at State Route 190 which continues on to Death Valley.

SR 136 is part of the California Freeway and Expressway System, but is not part of the National Highway System, a network of highways that are considered essential to the country's economy, defense, and mobility by the Federal Highway Administration.

== History ==
SR 136 was adopted as a state route in 1933 as part of Legislative Route 127. It was defined to run from US 99 at Tipton, to US 66 (formerly LRN 31, currently I-15) at Baker. The route would run through Porterville, the Sierra Nevada (only partially constructed), Olancha, and Death Valley. The main line of the route would cross the southeast shore of the Owens Lake. An unsigned branch, also a part of LRN 127 would run along the northeast shore, connecting at US 395 just south of Lone Pine.

In 1964, all of the state routes were renumbered. LRN 127 was divided into three separate state routes. Route 190 became SR 190 over its signed portion. Similarly, Route 127 became SR 127 over its signed portion. The short branch section became a signed route (although poorly signed) as SR 136. The route has not changed since the 1964 renumbering.

== Major intersections ==
Except where prefixed with a letter, postmiles were measured on the road as it was in 1964, based on the alignment that existed at the time, and do not necessarily reflect current mileage. Postmile prefixes include: R reflecting a realignment in the route since then, M indicating a second realignment, L referring to an overlap due to a correction or change, and T indicating postmiles classified as temporary. Segments that remain unconstructed or have been relinquished to local control may be omitted. The entire route is in Inyo County.

| Location | Postmile | Destinations | Notes |
|---|---|---|---|
| Lone Pine | 0.00 | US 395 – Lone Pine, Bishop, Los Angeles | Former concurrency with US 6; west end of SR 136; serves Southern Inyo Hospital |
| | 17.73 | SR 190 – Olancha, Death Valley | East end of SR 136 |
1.000 mi = 1.609 km; 1.000 km = 0.621 mi
