= Erigeron calvus =

Conservation status
- Critically Imperiled (NatureServe)

Scientific classification
- Kingdom: Plantae
- Clade: Tracheophytes
- Clade: Angiosperms
- Clade: Eudicots
- Clade: Asterids
- Order: Asterales
- Family: Asteraceae
- Genus: Erigeron
- Species: E. calvus

Binomial name
- Erigeron calvus Coville

Species of flowering plant

Erigeron calvus is a very rare species of flowering plants in the family Asteraceae known by the common names bald daisy or bald fleabane. It has been found only once, in a collection made in 1891 at the western foot of the Inyo Mountains near the community of Swansea in Inyo County.

The species is listed as "seriously endangered" and may quite possibly be extinct.

Erigeron calvus is a small biennial or perennial herb about 12 cm (5 inches) tall, producing a taproot. One plant can produce several flower heads, sometimes one per branch, sometimes in groups of 2 or 3. Each head has 50-100 small ray florets that are small and resemble disc florets, plus numerous genuine disc florets.
