= Swansea, California =

Unincorporated community in California, United States

Swansea
- Community
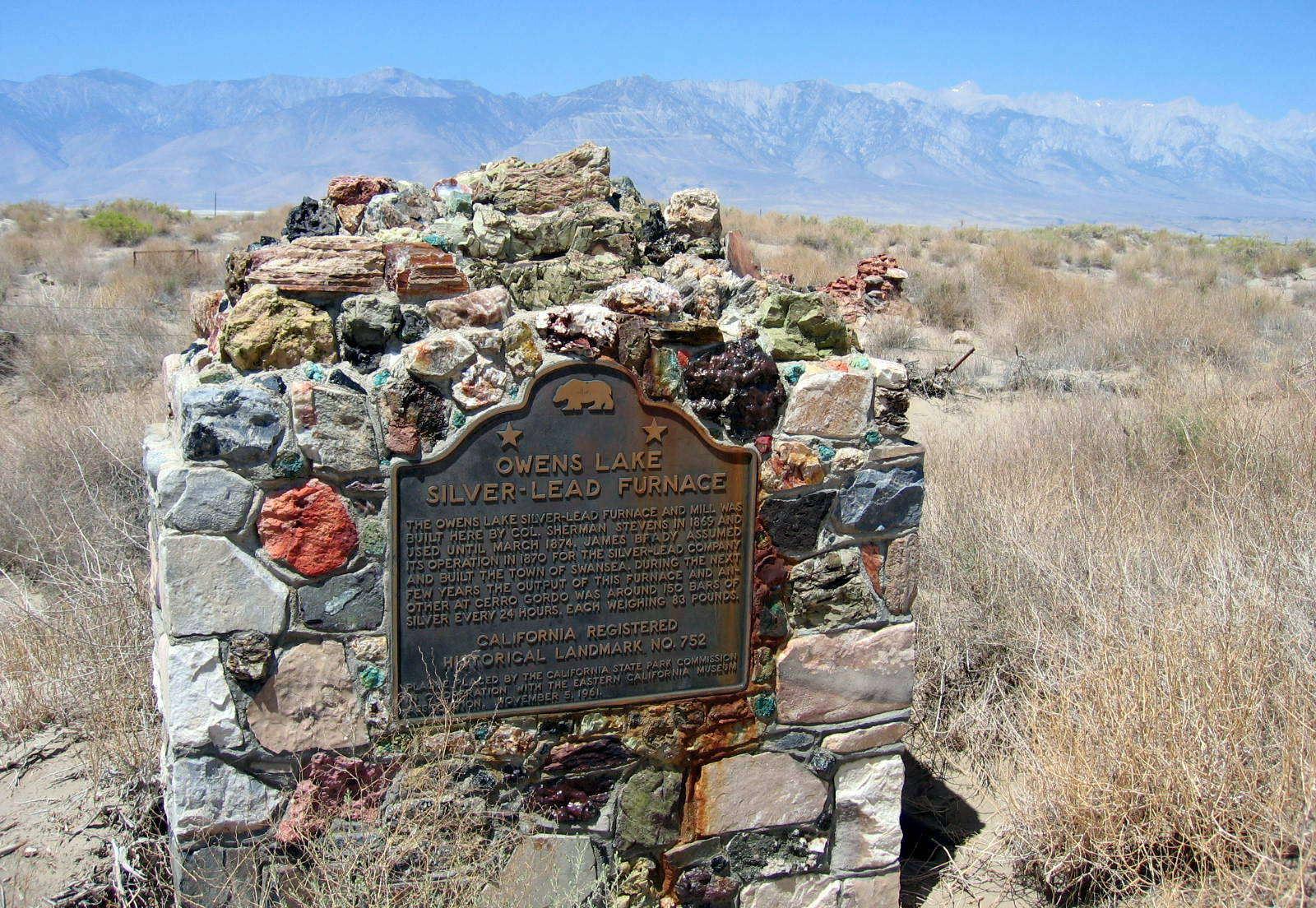
- Site of the smelter in Swansea

- Location in California Swansea (the United States)
- Coordinates: 36°31′29″N 117°54′14″W
- Country: United States
- State: California
- County: Inyo
- Elevation: 3,661 ft (1,116 m)

Swansea is a former settlement and unincorporated community in Inyo County, California, United States. It is located 8.5 miles (14 km) south of New York Butte, at an elevation of 3,661 ft (1,116 m).

Swansea was a boomtown located on the eastern shore of Owens Lake. Spawned by the success of the silver mining operations in the nearby Cerro Gordo Mines in the late 1860s, Swansea became a hub for smelting the ore and transporting the resulting ingots to Los Angeles, over 200 miles away. The smelter operated from 1869 to 1874.

Swansea was named after the town Swansea in south Wales, which was known as "Copperopolis" due to its large smelting industry from which many experienced extractive metallurgists emigrated to the United States.

The 1872 Lone Pine earthquake damaged the smelters and uplifted the shoreline, rendering the Swansea pier inaccessible by Owens Lake steamships. As a result, most of the smelting and transportation business moved to Keeler, approximately one mile to the south.

In the summer of 1874, a thunderstorm-induced debris flow inundated Swansea under several feet of water, rock, and sand. By then the town had been almost deserted, and the debris flow marked the end of Swansea.

As of 2007, only one building and a smelter foundation remained alongside California Route 136 (approximately 10 miles southeast of Lone Pine). The community is now a ghost town.

== See also ==
- List of ghost towns in California
