= Lone Pine, California =

- Census-designated place
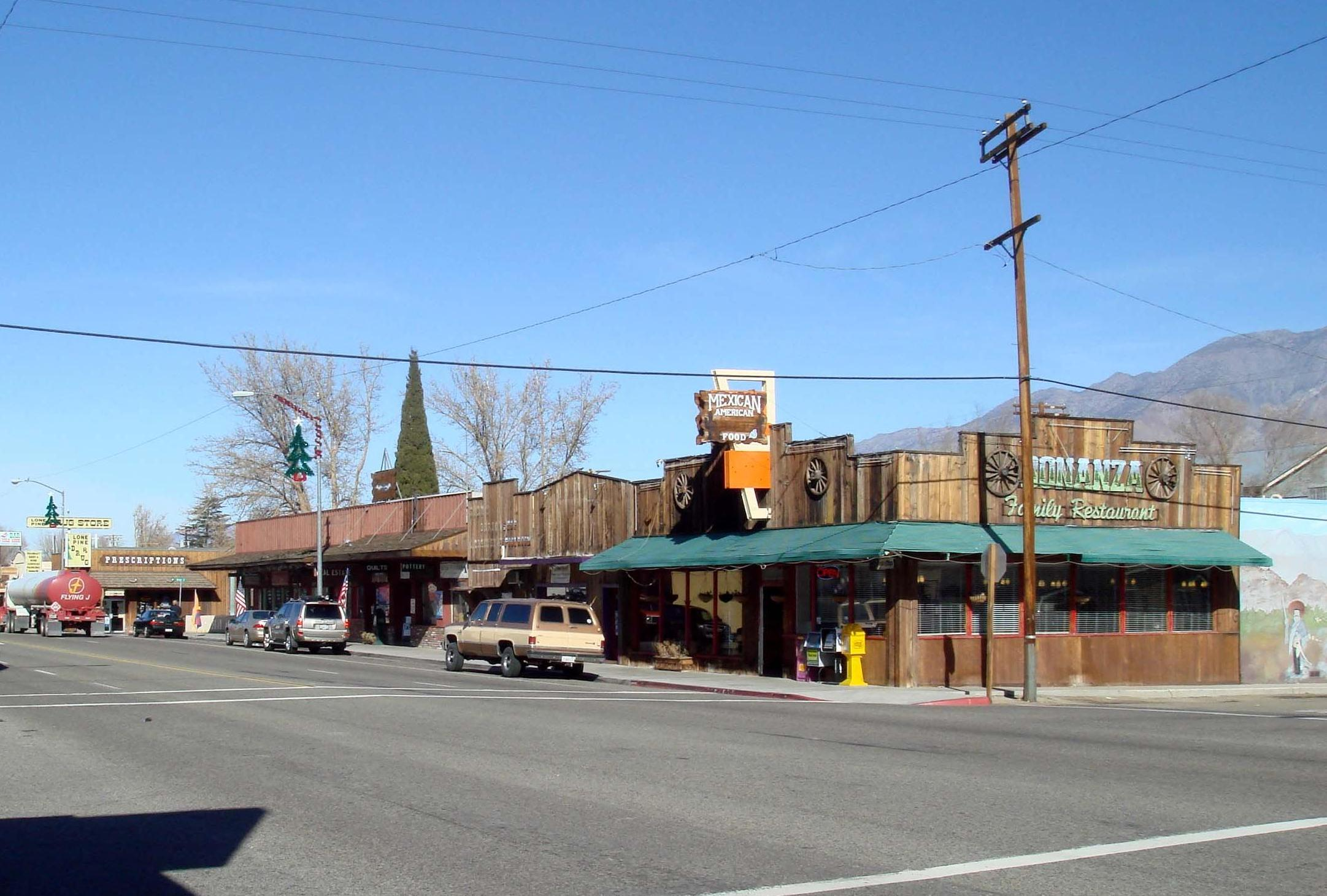
- Main Street

- Location in Inyo County and California
- Coordinates: 36°36′22″N 118°04′46″W
- Country: United States
- State: California
- County: Inyo

Area
  - Total: 19.216 sq mi (49.768 km^{2})
  - Land: 19.035 sq mi (49.300 km^{2})
  - Water: 0.181 sq mi (0.468 km^{2}) 0.94%
- Elevation: 4,203 ft (1,281 m)

Population (2020)
  - Total: 2,014
  - Density: 105.8/sq mi (40.85/km^{2})
- Time zone: UTC-8 (Pacific)
  - Summer (DST): UTC-7 (PDT)
- ZIP code: 93545
- Area codes: 442/760
- FIPS code: 06-42580
- GNIS feature ID: 2408123

Lone Pine is a census-designated place (CDP) in Inyo County, California, United States, located 16 mi (26 km) south-southeast of Independence. The population was 2,014 at the 2020 census, down from 2,035 at the 2010 census. The town is located in the Owens Valley, near the Alabama Hills and Mount Whitney, between the eastern peaks of the Sierra Nevada to the west and the Inyo Mountains to the east. The local hospital, Southern Inyo Hospital, offers standby emergency services. The town is named after a solitary pine tree that once existed at the mouth of Lone Pine Canyon. On March 26, 1872, the very large Lone Pine earthquake destroyed most of the town and killed 27 of its 250 to 300 residents.

== History ==
The Paiute Indians inhabited the Owens Valley area from prehistoric times. These early inhabitants are known to have established trading routes which extended to the Pacific Central Coast, delivering materials originating in the Owens Valley to such tribes as the Chumash.

A cabin was built here during the winter of 1861–62. A settlement developed over the following two years. The Lone Pine post office opened in 1870.

On March 26, 1872, at 2:30 am, Lone Pine experienced a violent earthquake that destroyed most of the town. At the time, the town consisted of 80 buildings made of mud and adobe; only 20 structures were left standing. As a result of the quake, which formed Diaz Lake, a total of 26 people lost their lives. A mass grave located just north of town commemorates the site of the main fault. One of the few remaining structures pre-dating the earthquake is the 21-inch-thick (53 cm) "Old Adobe Wall" located in the alley behind the Lone Star Bistro, a coffee house.

During the 1870s, Lone Pine was an important supply town for several nearby mining communities, including Kearsarge, Cerro Gordo, Keeler, Swansea, and Darwin. The Cerro Gordo mine high in the Inyo Mountains was one of the most productive silver mines in California. The silver was carried in ore buckets on a strong cable to Keeler, and then transported 4 miles (6.4 km) northwest to smelter ovens at Swansea. To supply the necessary building materials and fuel for these operations, a sawmill was constructed near Horseshoe Meadows by Colonel Sherman Stevens that produced wood for the smelters and the mines. The wood was moved by flume to the valley, where it was burned in adobe kilns to make charcoal, which was then transported by steamships across Owens Lake to the smelters at Swansea, about 12 miles (19 km) south of Lone Pine.

Railroads played a major role in the development of Lone Pine and the Owens Valley. In 1883, the Carson and Colorado Railway line was constructed from Belleville, Nevada, across the White Mountains to Benton, and then down into the Owens Valley where it ended in Keeler. The arrival of the C&C rail line, with its engine "The Slim Princess", and the stagecoach in Keeler were a major economic boost for the area. Twice a week, passengers arrived on the evening train, spent the night at the Lake View Hotel (later renamed the Hotel Keeler), and then took the stage the following morning to Mojave. A short line to the north connected with the Virginia and Truckee Railroad line at Mound House, Nevada.

In 1920, the history of Lone Pine was dramatically altered when a movie production company came to the Alabama Hills to make the silent film The Round-Up. Other companies soon discovered the scenic location, and in the coming decades, over 400 films, 100 television episodes, and countless commercials have used Lone Pine and the Alabama Hills as a film location. Notable films shot here in the 1920s and 1930s include Riders of the Purple Sage (1925) with Tom Mix, The Enchanted Hill (1926) with Jack Holt, Somewhere in Sonora (1927) with Ken Maynard, Blue Steel and The Man from Utah (1934) with John Wayne, Hop-Along Cassidy (1935) with William Boyd, The Charge of the Light Brigade (1936) with Errol Flynn, Oh, Susanna! (1936) with Gene Autry, Rhythm on the Range (1936) with Bing Crosby, The Cowboy and the Lady (1938) with Gary Cooper, Under Western Stars (1938) with Roy Rogers, and Gunga Din (1939) with Cary Grant.

In the coming decades, Lone Pine and the Alabama Hills continued to be used as the setting for Western films, including West of the Pecos (1945) with Robert Mitchum, Thunder Mountain (1947) with Tim Holt, The Gunfighter (1950) with Gregory Peck, The Nevadan (1950) with Randolph Scott, Bad Day at Black Rock (1955) with Spencer Tracy, Hell Bent for Leather (1960) with Audie Murphy, How the West Was Won (1962) with James Stewart, Nevada Smith (1966) with Steve McQueen, Joe Kidd (1972) with Clint Eastwood, Maverick (1994) with Mel Gibson, and The Lone Ranger (2013) with Johnny Depp. Through the years, non-Western films also used the unique landscape of the area, including Alfred Hitchcock's Saboteur (1942) with Robert Cummings, Samson and Delilah (1949) with Hedy Lamarr, Star Trek V: The Final Frontier (1989) with William Shatner, Tremors (1990) with Kevin Bacon, The Postman (1997) with Kevin Costner, and Gladiator (2000) with Russell Crowe.

The most important movie filmed in and around Lone Pine is director Raoul Walsh's High Sierra (1941), starring Humphrey Bogart as Roy Earle in the role that moved Bogart from respected supporting player to leading man. Cast and crew lodged in Lone Pine, and Walsh shot various scenes in and around Lone Pine. For the film's mountain chase scenes, Walsh took everyone to nearby Mt. Whitney, where pack mules lugged camera equipment up the mountainside: "filming began just outside Lone Pine ... on August 5, 1940. ... On a slope at the side of Mt. Whitney, ... a group of twenty men from the studio worked for four days to clear a path so that mountain-trained mules, packing cameras and other equipment, could get up to the shooting area. ... Bogart had to run three miles up a mountainside for two days ... Walsh ordered all the big boulders removed from the path of [Bogart's] final fall, but the little ones remained, and Bogart complained about that plenty ... Bogie especially did not want to trek up that mountain. This was the shoot on which Walsh gave him the nickname 'Bogey the Beefer'". John Huston wrote the screenplay, and Ida Lupino co-starred.

Following the Japanese attack on Pearl Harbor, on December 7, 1941, President Roosevelt signed an executive order that required people of Japanese ancestry living along the Pacific coast to be placed into relocation camps. One of these camps, Manzanar, was built 9 miles (14 km) north of Lone Pine.

== Geography ==
Lone Pine is situated in the Owens Valley with the picturesque Alabama Hills lying to the west. Their unique appearance has attracted many film companies over the years. The hills were named in 1862 by Southern sympathizers, commemorating the victories of the Confederate ship CSS Alabama.

As the crow flies, Lone Pine is 95 miles (153 km) due east of Fresno. However, there is no road crossing the Sierra Nevada to provide access from Lone Pine to Fresno. As a result, the closest accessible large city is Bakersfield, nearly 170 miles (270 km) away.

According to the United States Census Bureau, the CDP has a total area of 19.2 square miles (50 km^{2}), of which 19.0 square miles (49 km^{2}) is land and 0.2 square miles (0.52 km^{2}) (0.94%) is water.

=== Climate ===
Lone Pine and most of the Owens Valley have a cold desert climate (Köppen climate classification: BWk) characterised by hot summers and cold winters. January temperatures range from 54–59 °F (12–15 °C) to 25 to 30 °F (−4 to −1 °C), while July temperatures range from 95–99 °F (35–37 °C) to 59–64 °F (15–18 °C). Low humidity is prevalent, with average annual precipitation averaging less than 6 inches (150 mm). Snowfall varies greatly from year to year, averaging only 5 inches (0.13 m) annually. The nearest official National Weather Service co-operative weather station is in Independence where records date back to 1893. The National Weather Service has added an automated weather station in Lone Pine, which provides observations on its website, weather.gov.

== Demographics ==
Historical population
Census	Pop.	Note	%±
1950	1,415		—
1960	1,310		−7.4%
1970	1,241		−5.3%
1980	1,684		35.7%
1990	1,818		8.0%
2000	1,655		−9.0%
2010	2,035		23.0%
2020	2,014		−1.0%
U.S. Decennial Census; 1860–1870 1880-1890; 1900 1910 1920; 1930 1940 1950; 1960 1970 1980; 1990 2000 2010; 2020

Lone Pine first appeared as an unincorporated place in the 1950 U.S. census; and as a census designated place in the 1980 United States census.

Racial and ethnic composition

Lone Pine CDP, California – Racial and ethnic composition Note: the US Census treats Hispanic/Latino as an ethnic category. This table excludes Latinos from the racial categories and assigns them to a separate category. Hispanics/Latinos may be of any race.
Race / Ethnicity (NH = Non-Hispanic)	Pop 2000	Pop 2010	Pop 2020	% 2000	% 2010	% 2020
White alone (NH)	1,125	1,087	887	67.98%	53.42%	44.04%
Black or African American alone (NH)	0	4	7	0.00%	0.20%	0.35%
Native American or Alaska Native alone (NH)	34	189	239	2.05%	9.29%	11.87%
Asian alone (NH)	16	16	20	0.97%	0.79%	0.99%
Native Hawaiian or Pacific Islander alone (NH)	1	1	1	0.06%	0.05%	0.05%
Other race alone (NH)	7	1	5	0.42%	0.05%	0.25%
Mixed race or Multiracial (NH)	28	43	81	1.69%	2.11%	4.02%
Hispanic or Latino (any race)	444	694	774	26.83%	34.10%	38.43%
Total	1,655	2,035	2,014	100.00%	100.00%	100.00%

=== 2020 census ===
As of the 2020 census, Lone Pine had a population of 2,014. The population density was 105.8 inhabitants per square mile (40.8/km^{2}). The median age was 46.5 years. 20.9% of residents were under the age of 18, and 25.4% were 65 years of age or older. For every 100 females, there were 102.6 males, and for every 100 females age 18 and over, there were 103.7 males age 18 and over.

The racial makeup of Lone Pine was 1,026 (50.9%) White, 15 (0.7%) African American, 256 (12.7%) Native American, 20 (1.0%) Asian, 1 (0.0%) Pacific Islander, 452 (22.4%) from other races, and 244 (12.1%) from two or more races. Hispanic or Latino of any race were 774 persons (38.4%).

The census reported that 97.9% of the population lived in households and 2.1% were institutionalized. In addition, 0.0% of residents lived in urban areas, while 100.0% lived in rural areas.

There were 862 households, out of which 225 (26.1%) had children under the age of 18 living in them, 347 (40.3%) were married-couple households, 47 (5.5%) were cohabiting couple households, 226 (26.2%) had a female householder with no partner present, and 242 (28.1%) had a male householder with no partner present. 325 households (37.7%) were one person, and 163 (18.9%) were one person aged 65 or older. The average household size was 2.29. There were 479 families (55.6% of all households).

The age distribution was 421 people (20.9%) under the age of 18, 102 people (5.1%) aged 18 to 24, 456 people (22.6%) aged 25 to 44, 524 people (26.0%) aged 45 to 64, and 511 people (25.4%) who were 65 years of age or older.

There were 997 housing units at an average density of 52.4 units per square mile (20.2 units/km^{2}), of which 862 (86.5%) were occupied. Of these, 483 (56.0%) were owner-occupied, and 379 (44.0%) were occupied by renters. 13.5% of housing units were vacant. The homeowner vacancy rate was 0.0%, and the rental vacancy rate was 5.9%.

Income and poverty

In 2023, the US Census Bureau estimated that the median household income was $49,063, and the per capita income was $45,061. About 17.2% of families and 15.0% of the population were below the poverty line.

=== 2010 census ===
The 2010 United States census reported that Lone Pine had a population of 2,035. The population density was 105.9 inhabitants per square mile (40.9/km^{2}). The racial makeup of Lone Pine was 1,334 (65.6%) White, 6 (0.3%) Black, 205 (10.1%) Native American, 17 (0.8%) Asian, 1 (0.0%) Pacific Islander, 376 (18.5%) from other races, and 96 (4.7%) from two or more races. Hispanic or Latino of any race were 694 persons (34.1%).

The Census reported that 1,972 people (96.9% of the population) lived in households, 0 (0%) lived in non-institutionalised group quarters, and 63 (3.1%) were institutionalised.

There were 831 households, out of which 254 (30.6%) had children under the age of 18 living in them, 374 (45.0%) were opposite-sex married couples living together, 95 (11.4%) had a female householder with no husband present, 46 (5.5%) had a male householder with no wife present. There were 53 (6.4%) unmarried opposite-sex partnerships, and 5 (0.6%) same-sex married couples or partnerships. 276 households (33.2%) were made up of individuals, and 107 (12.9%) had someone living alone who was 65 years of age or older. The average household size was 2.37. There were 515 families (62.0% of all households); the average family size was 3.04.

The population was spread out, with 492 people (24.2%) under the age of 18, 136 people (6.7%) aged 18 to 24, 442 people (21.7%) aged 25 to 44, 580 people (28.5%) aged 45 to 64, and 385 people (18.9%) who were 65 years of age or older. The median age was 41.9 years. For every 100 females, there were 98.5 males. For every 100 females age 18 and over, there were 96.1 males.

There were 1,004 housing units at an average density of 52.3 per square mile (20.2/km^{2}), of which 831 were occupied, of which 452 (54.4%) were owner-occupied, and 379 (45.6%) were occupied by renters. The homeowner vacancy rate was 2.6%; the rental vacancy rate was 7.1%. 1,030 people (50.6% of the population) lived in owner-occupied housing units and 942 people (46.3%) lived in rental housing units.

=== Lone Pine Indian Reservation ===
The Lone Pine Indian Reservation is home to Owens Valley Paiute and Shoshone members of the federally recognized tribe, the Paiute-Shoshone Indians of the Lone Pine Community of the Lone Pine Reservation. The tribe traditionally lived in sedentary villages in the valley due to the suitable climate and abundant food supply. These people have been living here for several thousands of years. The reservation is along the south side of town on both sides of US395.

== Tourism ==
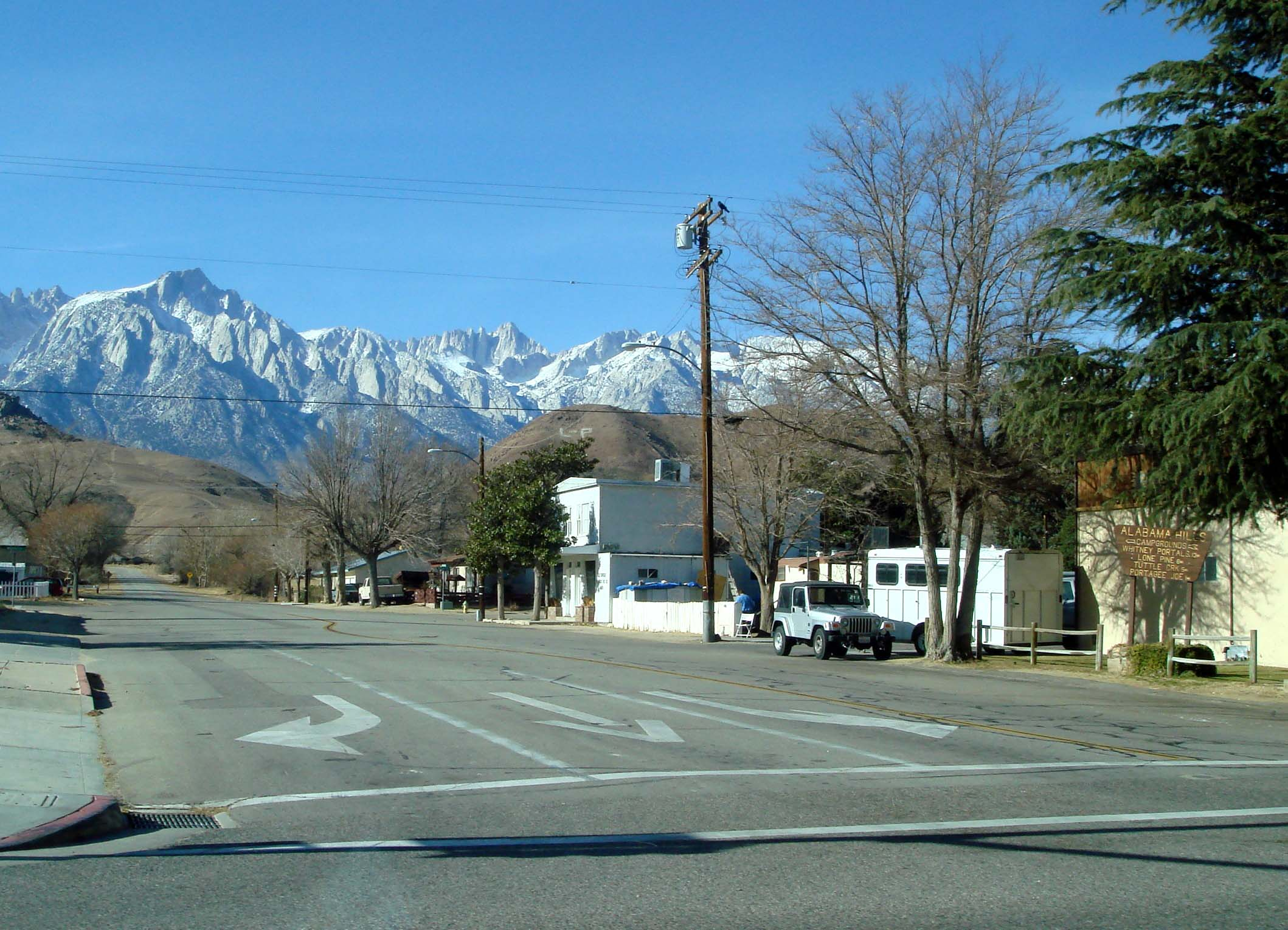
Lone Pine Peak, just left of Mount Whitney (high point in the distant center-left horizon) and the rest of the Sierra Nevada, dominates the views west of town

The town is home to an Interagency Visitor Center at SR136 and US395.

Much of the local economy is based on tourism, as the town is between several major tourist destinations, such as Mount Whitney, Sequoia National Park, Kings Canyon National Park, Mammoth Mountain, Death Valley National Park, and Yosemite National Park; many motels line the main road through town.

=== Manzanar National Historic Site ===
The Manzanar National Historic Site (formerly the Manzanar War Relocation Center), a Japanese American internment camp during World War II, is located on Highway 395 north of Lone Pine and south of Independence. Manzanar (which means "apple orchard" in Spanish) is the most infamous of the 10 camps in which Japanese Americans, both citizens (including natural-born Americans) and resident aliens, were encamped during World War II. Manzanar has been identified as the best preserved of these camps by the United States National Park Service which maintains and is restoring the site as a U.S. National Historic Site.

=== Sierra Nevada ===
The Sierra Nevada range and the Inyo Mountains dominate the views from the town.

=== Film history at Lone Pine ===
The Lone Pine Film History Museum, supported by Beverly and Jim Rogers, highlights the area's frequent appearances in Hollywood feature films. The Alabama Hills west of town are frequently used as a filming location for Western movies. Since the early years of filmmaking, directors and their production units have used the Lone Pine area to represent the iconic American West. Approaching the 100th anniversary of The Roundup (1920), the first documented film produced in the area, Lone Pine has played host to hundreds of the industry's best-known directors and actors, among them directors William Wyler, John Ford, George Stevens, and William Wellman, and actors John Wayne, Bing Crosby, Gene Autry, Clint Eastwood, Barbara Stanwyck, and Jeff Bridges. The Whitney Portal road was used in the film High Sierra (1941) with Humphrey Bogart, which culminated with a shoot-out between Bogart's character and the police, at the foot of Mount Whitney. The classic Bad Day at Black Rock (1955), starring Spencer Tracy, Robert Ryan and Anne Francis, was also filmed in and around the Lone Pine area. Lone Pine is also the location of several scenes in Iron Man (2008), depicting Afghanistan, and in the Godzilla (2014) remake, as a temporary military forward operating base ("FOB").

Barbara Stanwyck in accordance with her wishes had her cremated remains and ashes scattered from a helicopter over Lone Pine, where she had made some of her western films.

The Forum Theater is a theater-cafe that hosts live music, theater, and films at weekends. The Lone Pine Film Festival has been held every year since 1989 to celebrate the rich heritage that filmmakers have brought to the area over the years.

The Alabama Hills Recreation Area is directed by the Bureau of Land Management for public recreation.

=== Events ===
From 1971 through 1981, Lone Pine was the site of the annual Lone Pine International Chess tournament. Winners of the Lone Pine tournament included world champion Tigran Petrosian, world championship finalist Viktor Korchnoi, and U.S. champions Arthur Bisguier, Walter Browne, and Larry Evans.

== Government ==
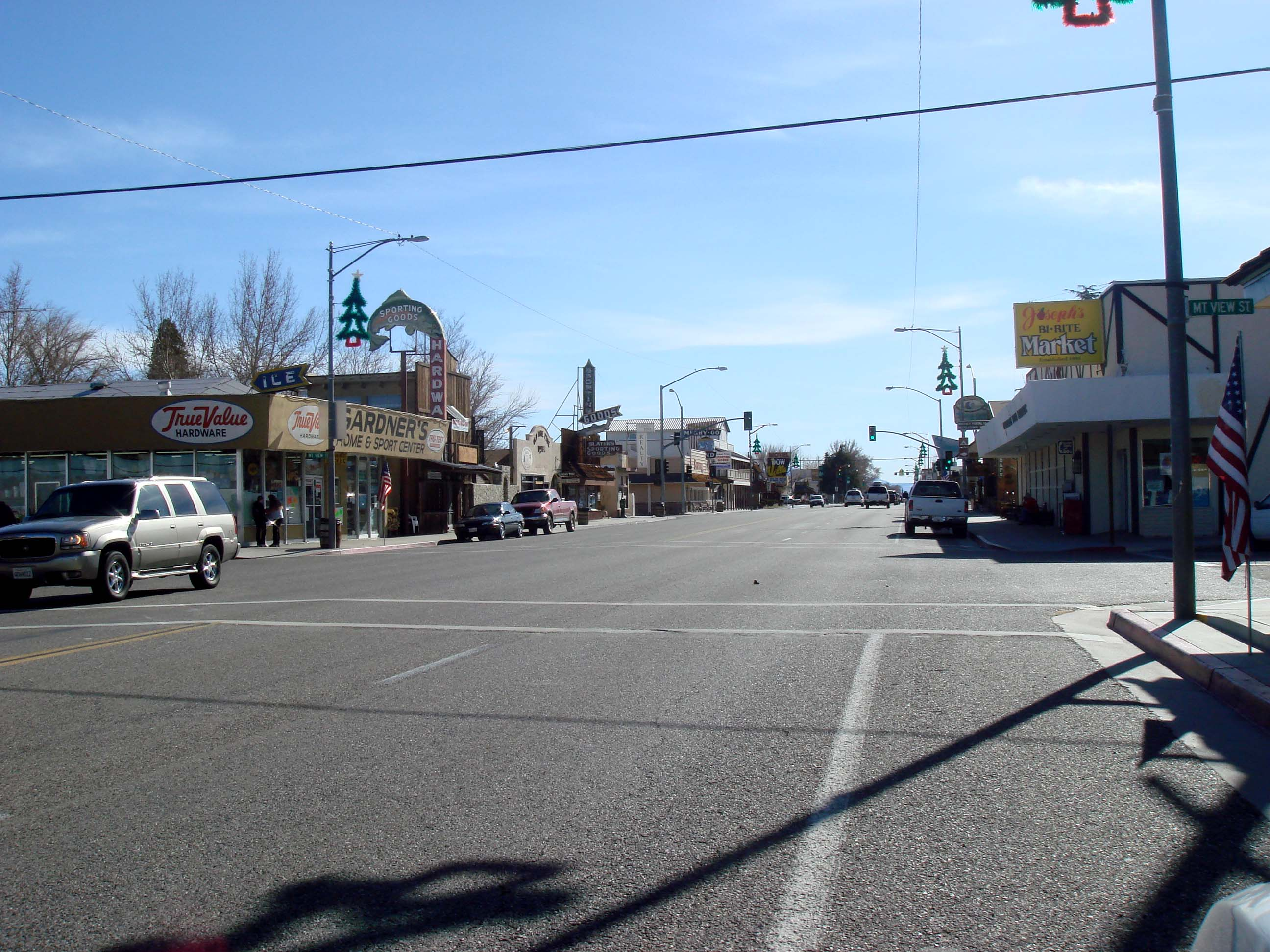
U.S. Route 395 makes up the main street in Lone Pine

In the state legislature, Lone Pine is in the 4th senatorial district, represented by Republican Marie Alvarado-Gil, and the 8th Assembly district, represented by Republican David Tangipa.

Federally, Lone Pine is in California's 3rd congressional district, represented by Independent Kevin Kiley.

== Education ==
Lone Pine is served by the Lone Pine Unified School District. There is one high school, Lone Pine High School, located at the southern end of town along Highway 395. Lo-Inyo elementary school is located at the northern end of town, just off 395.

== Transportation ==
Serving the area with a 4,000-foot (1,200 m) runway, Lone Pine Airport (FAA identifier: O26) is located approximately one mile (1.6 km) southeast of town at 36°35′17″N 118°03′07″W.

The community is located on U.S. Route 395, north of State Route 136. Owens Dry Lake is just over six miles (10 km) south of town on US 395.

Public transportation is provided by Eastern Sierra Transit Authority

== See also ==
- Inyo National Forest
