= Diaz Lake =

Lake in the state of California, United States

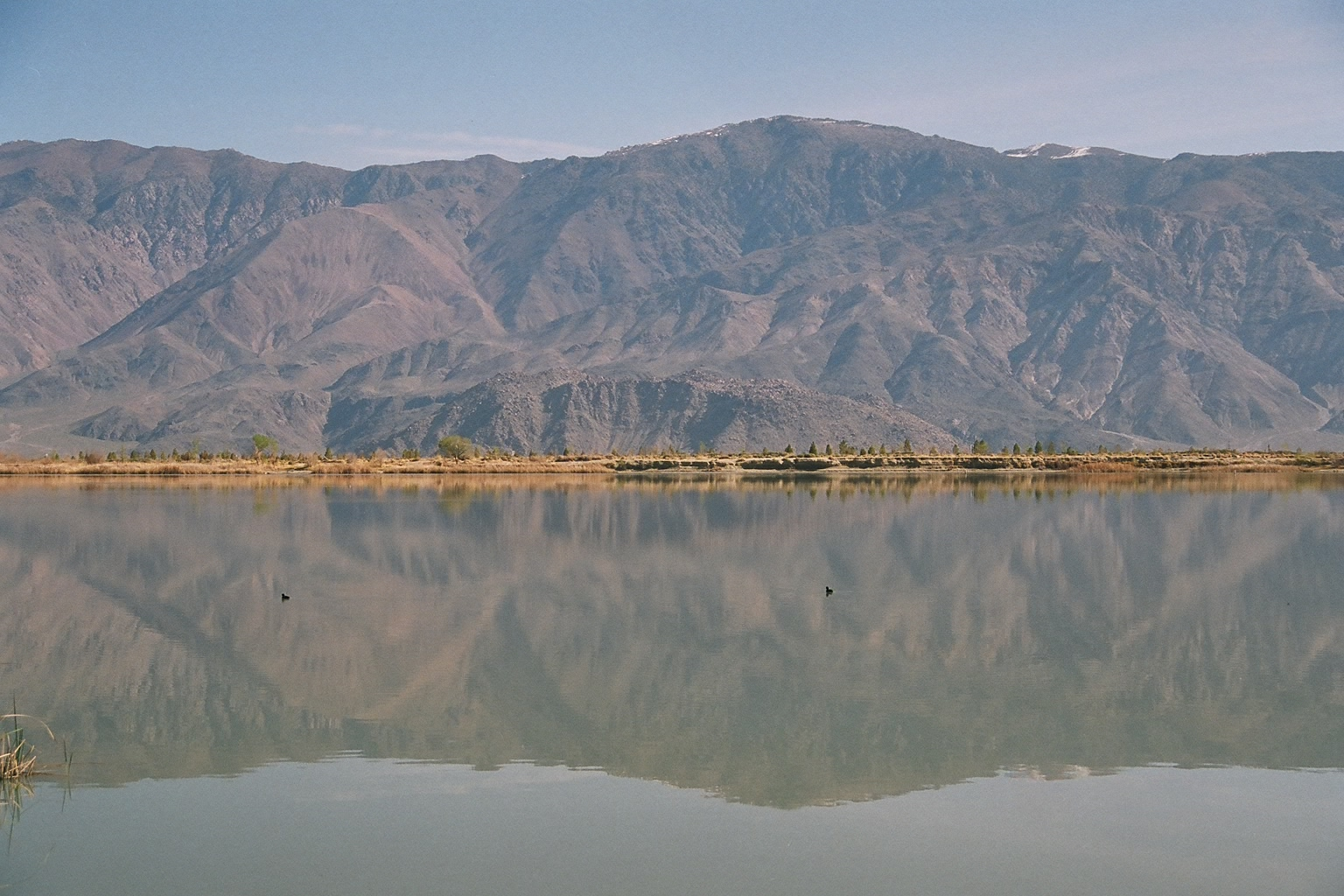
- Looking east toward Inyo Mountains

- Location within California Location within the United States
- Location: Owens Valley, Inyo County, California, United States
- Coordinates: 36°33′34″N 118°03′17″W
- Type: Lake
- Basin countries: United States
- First flooded: March 26, 1872
- Surface elevation: 3,674 feet (1,120 m)

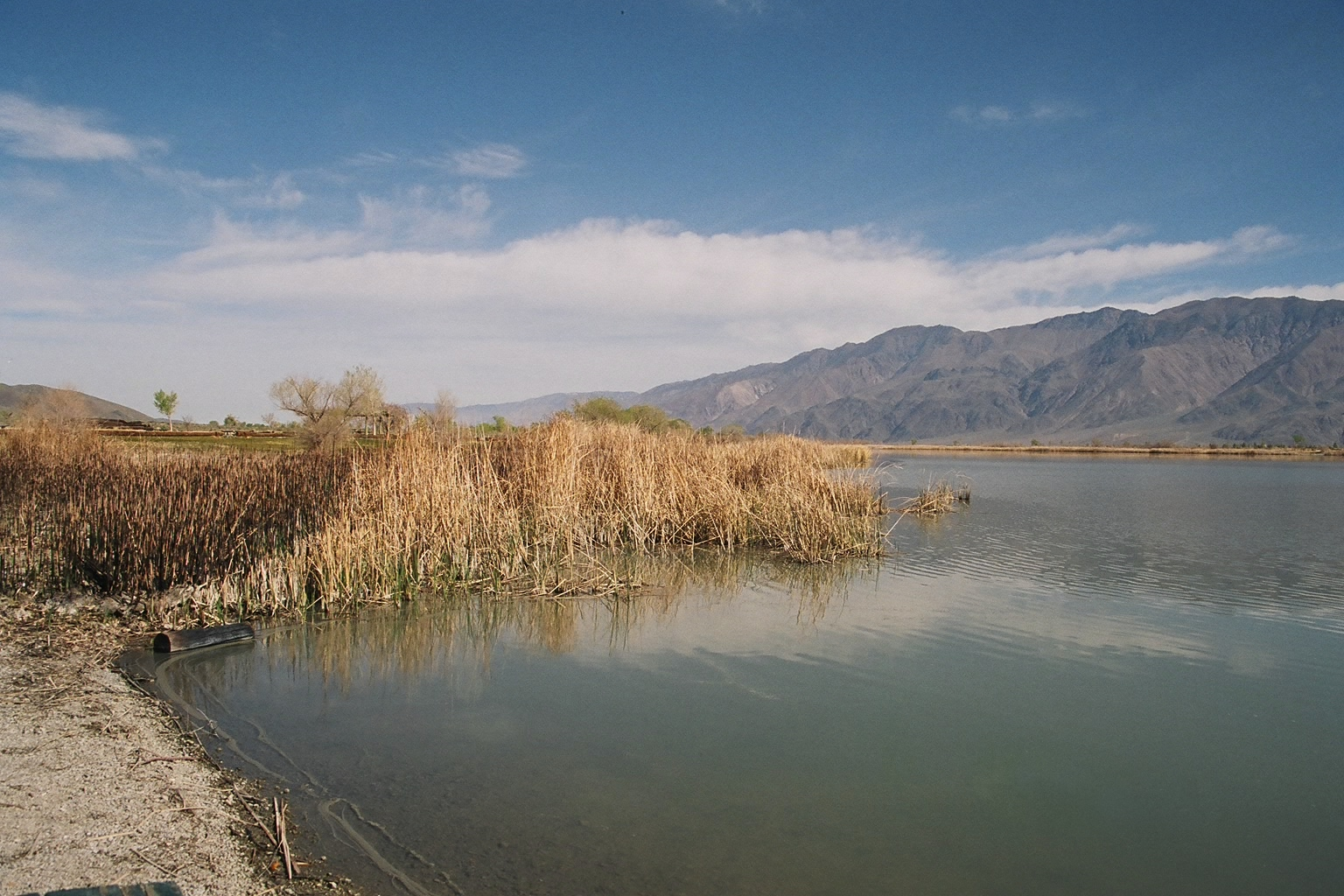
Diaz Lake

Diaz Lake, elevation 3,674 feet (1,120 m), is located in the Owens Valley, just south of Lone Pine, California, United States. It covers 80 acres (32 ha).

== History ==
The lake was formed by the 1872 Lone Pine earthquake on Tuesday, March 26 of that year when 18 mi (29 km) of the Owens Valley dropped approximately 20 feet (6 m) (see graben) and a new spring opened, causing water to fill the lowland.

The lake was named for the Diaz family who established a ranch here when brothers Rafael and Eleuterio Diaz emigrated from Chile in the 1860s. They owned and operated a successful cattle ranch until the land was sold to the city of Los Angeles.

== Access ==
Year-round fishing is available, and the "Diaz Lake Fish Derby" is held the first Saturday in March.

== See also ==
- List of lakes in California
