= Pearsonville, California =

Pearsonville
- Unincorporated Community; Census Designated Place
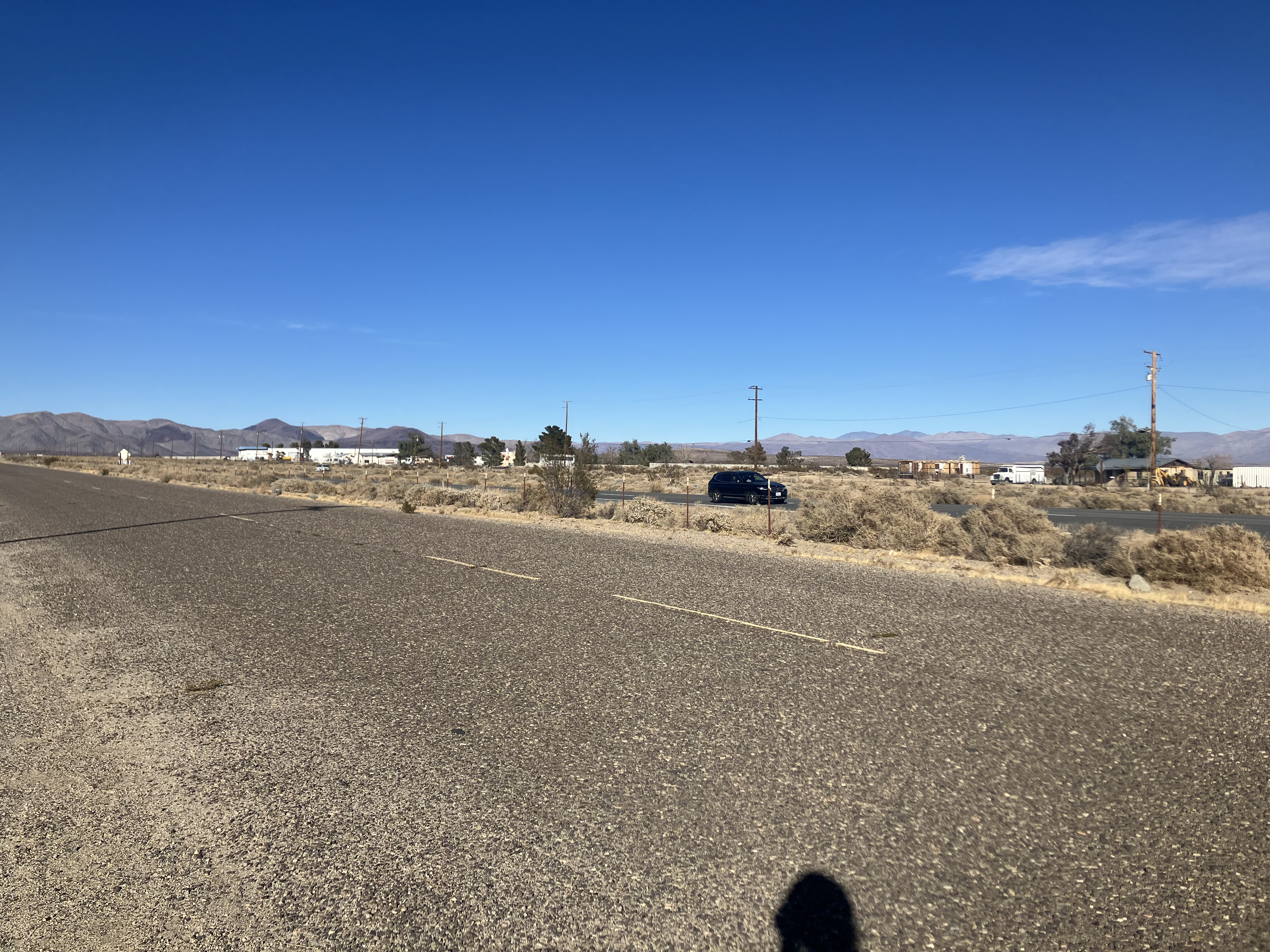
- Pearsonville CA facing northeast along Sterling Road

- Location in Inyo County and the state of California

- Location in the United States
- Coordinates: 35°49′03″N 117°52′18″W
- Country: United States
- State: California
- County: Inyo

Area
  - Total: 4.193 sq mi (10.859 km^{2})
  - Land: 4.111 sq mi (10.648 km^{2})
  - Water: 0.081 sq mi (0.211 km^{2}) 1.94%
- Elevation: 2,549 ft (777 m)

Population (2020)
  - Total: 8
  - Density: 1.9/sq mi (0.75/km^{2})
- Time zone: UTC-8 (Pacific (PST))
  - Summer (DST): UTC-7 (PDT)
- ZIP code: 93527
- Area codes: 442/760
- FIPS code: 06-56294
- GNIS feature ID: 2409043

Pearsonville is a census-designated place (CDP) in Inyo County, California, United States, along U.S. Route 395. The population was 8 at the 2020 census, down from 17 at the 2010 census.

== History ==
Pearsonville was named for Lucy and Andrew Pearson, who founded the town on a 40-acre plot of land they purchased in 1960. The Pearson family started Pearson's Auto Wrecking, a vehicle towing and recovery business, in 1964. Lucy Pearson collected thousands of hubcaps, earning the title "the Hubcap Queen", In its heyday in the 1980s, Pearsonville had a post office, as well as a general store, restaurant, automobile parts store, 24-hour towing service, motorcycle racetrack (the Pearsonville Speedway) and a trailer park, and the town was known informally as the "hubcap capital of the world". Today, it is a ghost town, consisting of a gas station, convenience store, a small museum and antique store. The automobile salvage (Pearson's Auto Wrecking) business is still operational, and there is also an 18-foot-tall molded fiberglass sculpture of the "Uniroyal Gal".

== Geography ==
Located in the northern end of the Indian Wells Valley, Pearsonville is located on the line between Kern County and Inyo county, 17.25 miles (27.76 km) northwest from the nearest incorporated community, Ridgecrest. The unincorporated community is located just south of Nine Mile Canyon Road. U.S. Route 395 traverses through Pearsonville, and the truncated section of the highway locally known as Sterling Road passes through the community and ends at Nine Mile Canyon Road.

The unincorporated community is home to a Shell gas station and a Subway, but otherwise is entirely rural. The now closed Golden Cactus museum was a popular tourist destination, but has since been temporarily closed to the public.

According to the United States Census Bureau, the CDP has a total area of 4.2 square miles (11 km^{2}), 98.06% of which is land and 1.94% is water.

== Demographics ==
Historical population
Census	Pop.	Note	%±
2000	27		—
2010	17		−37.0%
2020	8		−52.9%
U.S. Decennial Census; 1860–1870 1880-1890; 1900 1910 1920; 1930 1940 1950; 1960 1970 1980; 1990 2000 2010

Pearsonville first appeared as a census designated place in the 2000 U.S. census.

=== Racial and ethnic composition ===
Pearsonville CDP, California – Racial and ethnic composition Note: the US Census treats Hispanic/Latino as an ethnic category. This table excludes Latinos from the racial categories and assigns them to a separate category. Hispanics/Latinos may be of any race.
Race / Ethnicity (NH = Non-Hispanic)	Pop 2000	Pop 2010	Pop 2020	% 2000	% 2010	% 2020
White alone (NH)	23	16	6	85.19%	94.12%	75.00%
Black or African American alone (NH)	0	0	0	0.00%	0.00%	0.00%
Native American or Alaska Native alone (NH)	0	0	0	0.00%	0.00%	0.00%
Asian alone (NH)	0	0	0	0.00%	0.00%	0.00%
Native Hawaiian or Pacific Islander alone (NH)	0	0	0	0.00%	0.00%	0.00%
Other race alone (NH)	0	0	0	0.00%	0.00%	0.00%
Mixed race or Multiracial (NH)	0	0	0	0.00%	0.00%	0.00%
Hispanic or Latino (any race)	4	1	2	14.81%	5.88%	25.00%
Total	27	17	8	100.00%	100.00%	100.00%

=== 2010 ===
The 2010 United States census reported that Pearsonville had a population of 17. The population density was 4.0 people per square mile (1.6/km^{2}). The racial makeup of Pearsonville consisted of 16 White people and one person from other races. One of those residents was Hispanic or Latino. The Census reported that all 17 residents lived in nine households, out of which three were married couples living together, one had a female householder with no husband present, and one had a male householder with no wife present. Four households were made up of individuals, and two had someone living alone who was 65 years of age or older. The average household size was 1.89 people. There were five families; the average family size was 2.40 people.

The population age distribution is two people aged 18 to 24, one person aged 25 to 44, eight people aged 45 to 64, and six people who were 65 years of age or older. The median age was 59.8 years. The town had a female to male ratio of 10:7.

There were 16 housing units at an average density of 3.8 per square mile (1.5/km^{2}), of which nine were occupied, of which seven were owner-occupied, and two were occupied by renters. The homeowner vacancy rate was 12.5%. 15 people lived in owner-occupied housing units and two people lived in rental housing units

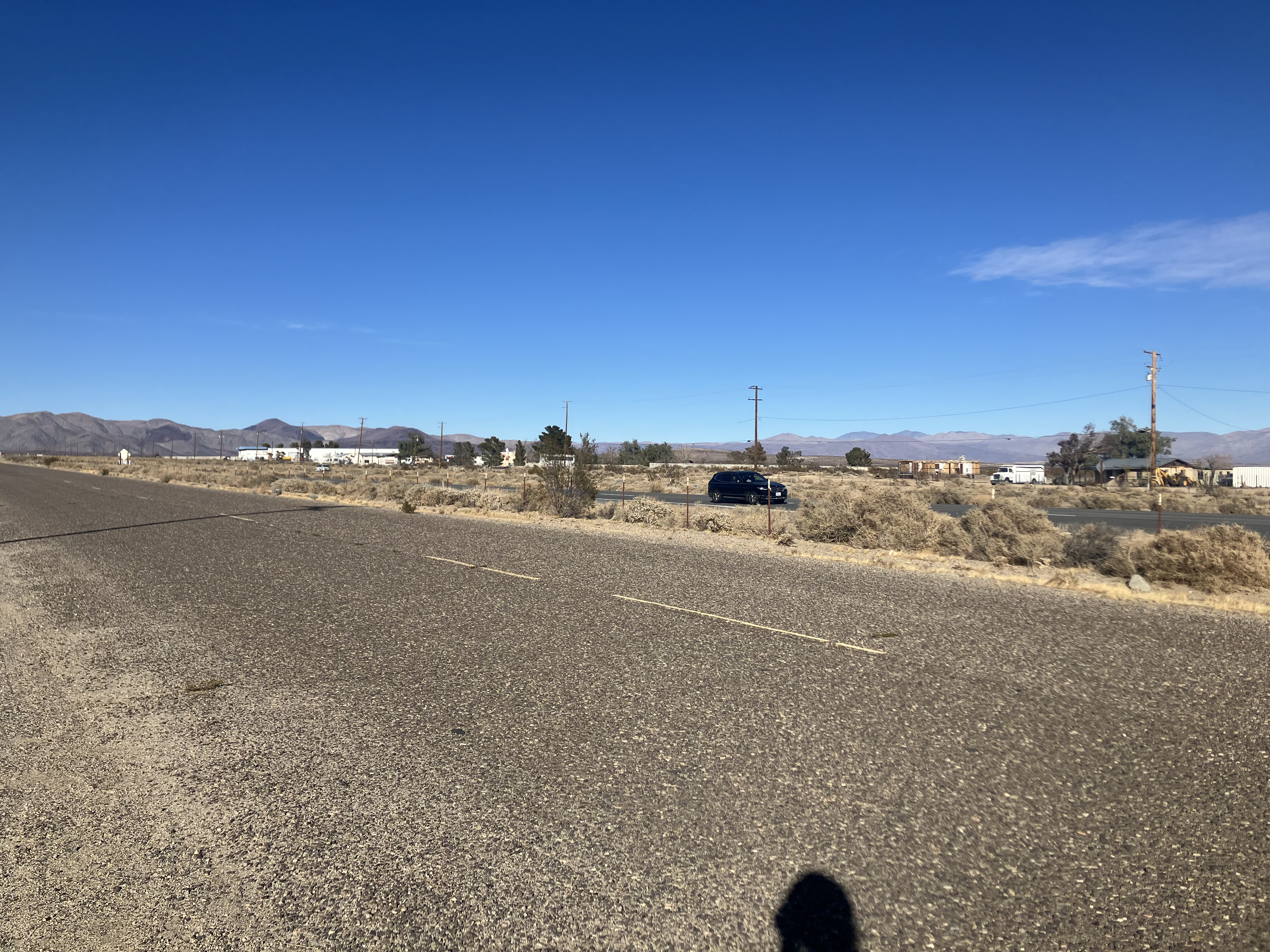
Pearsonville CA, facing northeast along Sterling Road

=== 2000 ===
As of the census of 2000, there were 27 people, 12 households, and 8 families living in the CDP. The population density was 6.4 people per square mile (2.5/km^{2}). There were 22 housing units at an average density of 5.2 per square mile (2.0/km^{2}). The racial makeup of the CDP was 88.89% White, 7.41% from other races, and 3.70% from two or more races. Hispanic or Latino of any race were 14.81% of the population.

There were 12 households, out of which 25.0% had children under the age of 18 living with them, 58.3% were married couples living together, 8.3% had a female householder with no husband present, and 33.3% were non-families. 33.3% of all households were made up of individuals, and 25.0% had someone living alone who was 65 years of age or older. The average household size was 2.25 and the average family size was 2.88.

In the CDP, the population age distribution is 25.9% under the age of 18, 22.2% from 25 to 44, 40.7% from 45 to 64, and 11.1% who were 65 years of age or older. The median age was 46 years. For every 100 females, there were 125.0 males. For every 100 females age 18 and over, there were 81.8 males.

== Politics ==
In the state legislature, Pearsonville is in the 4th senatorial district, represented by Republican Marie Alvarado-Gil, and the 8th Assembly district, represented by Republican David Tangipa.

Federally, Pearsonville is in California's 3rd congressional district, represented by Independent Kevin Kiley.

== Education ==
Pearsonville is served by the Lone Pine Unified School District. Lone Pine High School is the comprehensive high school of the district.
