= Richard Lemon Owings =

American frontiersman

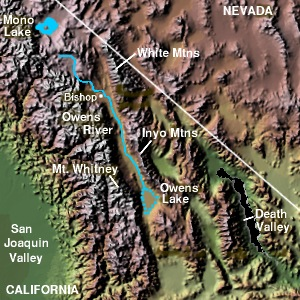
- Owens Valley, Owens River, and Owens Lake, all named after Richard L. Owings
- Born: October 14, 1812; Owings Mills, Maryland, US
- Died: June 11, 1902 (aged 89); Circleville, Kansas, US
- Other names: Dick Owens, Richard Owens
- Occupations: fur trapper, guide, Native American fighter
- Years active: 1835-1850
- Known for: companion of Kit Carson

Richard Lemon Owings (1812–1902), more commonly known as Richard Owens or Dick Owens, was a pioneer of the American West who played an important role in John C. Fremont's third expedition to the Great Basin and California.

Owings is well known as a frequent companion and close friend of Kit Carson. He worked as a trapper prior to joining Fremont's Company. Fremont named the Owens Valley, Owens River, and Owens Lake in Eastern California all after him, even though Owings never visited any of them.

== Biography ==
=== Early life ===
Owings was born in Owings Mills, Maryland (near Baltimore) on October 14, 1812. The family relocated to the "wooded hills" of Zanesville, Ohio, where Owings was primarily raised. He was apprenticed to a gunsmith at age 16, and was able to build a flintock rifle "as well as shoot one with accuracy and speed." Owings was about 21 years old in 1834 when he headed west to the Rocky Mountains with an "experienced mountaineer" named Caleb Wilkins.

=== Career with Carson and Fremont ===
In 1839, Owings was part of a group of trappers who stole horses from "friendly Shoshones," and Carson was tasked with recovering the animals from the men. The incident was notably omitted from Carson's memoirs, as he "may have preferred not to remember an occasion when they were on opposite sides and might have shot each other, and which did not reflect well on Owens."

In 1839, Owings spent three months trapping beaver with Carson in South Dakota. The two became close friends and were frequent companions over the following decade.

Carson and other "mountain men" invariably called Owings by the name "Dick Owens". Carson and Owings both spent most of the early 1840s living near Taos, New Mexico, and in March 1845, the two started a joint farming venture fifty miles away in Rayado. When they learned, however, that Fremont was preparing a third expedition to the Great Basin and California, they sold everything at a loss and moved to join Fremont's company. Carson had served Fremont as a guide on his earlier expeditions and was highly trusted by him.

Fremont would later write of Owings in his memoirs: "That Owens was a good man it is enough to say that he and Carson were friends. Cool, brave, and of good judgment; a good hunter and good shot; experienced in mountain life; he was an acquisition, and proved valuable throughout the campaign." Fremont continued that Owings was equal in "courage to [Kit Carson and Alexis Godey], and in coolness equal to Godey, had the coup-d'œil of a chess player, covering the whole field with a glance that sees the best move. His dark-hazel eye was the marked feature of his face, large and flat and far-sighted."

The expedition traveled across the Utah desert to Oregon and spent some time there before moving south along the eastern flank of the Cascade Range and Sierra Nevada. In the vicinity of Truckee a small group broke off, including Fremont, Carson, and Owens, and crossed the Sierra Nevada range, arriving eventually in Sacramento. Meanwhile, most of the group continued southward, traveling through the area that Fremont would later name Owens Valley, crossing the mountains once they reached Walker Pass. Thus, Owings would never see the river, valley, and lake that Fremont would later name after him.

=== Later life and death ===
Around 1849, he returned to his family near Marion, Indiana. In 1854, married Emily Miller, who was 25 years his junior. He and Emily had four sons.

He moved to Iowa during the Civil War and then to Circleville, Kansas, in 1872. A newspaper profile written on Owings in March 1902 noted that "barring the fact that his hearing is somewhat impaired, the old pioneer is in good physical condition." He died at Circleville on June 11, 1902, aged 89.
