= Cartago, California =

Census-designated place in Inyo County, California

Cartago
- Unincorporated Community; Census Designated Place
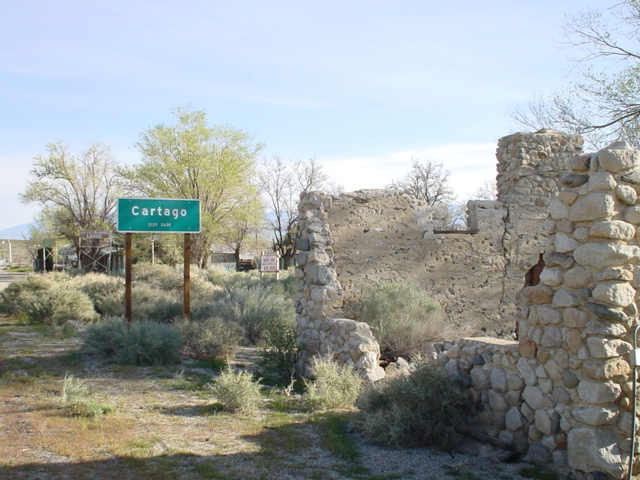
- Cartago

- Location in Inyo County and the state of California

- Location in the United States
- Coordinates: 36°18′44″N 118°01′34″W
- Country: United States
- State: California
- County: Inyo

Area
  - Total: 1.17 sq mi (3.04 km^{2})
  - Land: 1.17 sq mi (3.03 km^{2})
  - Water: 0.0039 sq mi (0.01 km^{2}) 0.24%
- Elevation: 3,635 ft (1,108 m)

Population (2020)
  - Total: 62
  - Density: 53.0/sq mi (20.47/km^{2})
- Time zone: UTC-8 (Pacific (PST))
  - Summer (DST): UTC-7 (PDT)
- ZIP code: 93549
- Area codes: 442/760
- FIPS code: 06-11600
- GNIS feature ID: 2407973

Cartago (Spanish for "Carthage") is a census-designated place in Inyo County, California, United States. Cartago is located on the west side of Owens Lake 3 miles (4.8 km) north-northwest of Olancha. The population was 62 at the 2020 census, down from 92 at the 2010 census.

== Geography ==
According to the United States Census Bureau, the CDP has a total area of 1.2 square miles (3.1 km^{2}), over 99% of which is land.

== History ==
Cartago took its name from the Spanish name for ancient Carthage. The first post office at Cartago opened in 1918. During the heyday of mining in the area (the 1870s), Cartago was a steamboat port for shipment of wood and ore. Prior names include Carthage, Daniersburg, and Lakeville.

== Demographics ==
Historical population
Census	Pop.	Note	%±
2000	109		—
2010	92		−15.6%
2020	62		−32.6%
U.S. Decennial Census; 1860–1870 1880-1890; 1900 1910 1920; 1930 1940 1950; 1960 1970 1980; 1990 2000 2010; 2020

Cartago first appeared as a census designated place in the 2000 U.S. census.

=== Racial and ethnic composition ===
Cartago CDP, California – Racial and ethnic composition Note: the US Census treats Hispanic/Latino as an ethnic category. This table excludes Latinos from the racial categories and assigns them to a separate category. Hispanics/Latinos may be of any race.
Race / Ethnicity (NH = Non-Hispanic)	Pop 2000	Pop 2010	Pop 2020	% 2000	% 2010	% 2020
White alone (NH)	65	63	37	59.63%	68.48%	59.68%
Black or African American alone (NH)	0	0	0	0.00%	0.00%	0.00%
Native American or Alaska Native alone (NH)	1	5	0	0.92%	5.43%	0.00%
Asian alone (NH)	0	0	1	0.00%	0.00%	1.61%
Native Hawaiian or Pacific Islander alone (NH)	0	0	0	0.00%	0.00%	0.00%
Other race alone (NH)	0	0	0	0.00%	0.00%	0.00%
Mixed race or Multiracial (NH)	1	8	5	0.92%	8.70%	8.06%
Hispanic or Latino (any race)	42	16	19	38.53%	17.39%	30.65%
Total	109	92	62	100.00%	100.00%	100.00%

=== 2020 census ===
As of the 2020 census, Cartago had a population of 62. The median age was 53.5 years. 12.9% of residents were under the age of 18 and 29.0% of residents were 65 years of age or older. For every 100 females there were 93.8 males, and for every 100 females age 18 and over there were 92.9 males age 18 and over.

0.0% of residents lived in urban areas, while 100.0% lived in rural areas.

There were 31 households in Cartago, of which 16.1% had children under the age of 18 living in them. Of all households, 64.5% were married-couple households, 3.2% were households with a male householder and no spouse or partner present, and 19.4% were households with a female householder and no spouse or partner present. About 6.4% of all households were made up of individuals and 0.0% had someone living alone who was 65 years of age or older.

There were 50 housing units, of which 38.0% were vacant. The homeowner vacancy rate was 3.7% and the rental vacancy rate was 0.0%.

Racial composition as of the 2020 census
Race	Number	Percent
White	45	72.6%
Black or African American	0	0.0%
American Indian and Alaska Native	1	1.6%
Asian	2	3.2%
Native Hawaiian and Other Pacific Islander	0	0.0%
Some other race	0	0.0%
Two or more races	14	22.6%

=== 2010 census ===
The 2010 United States census reported that Cartago had a population of 92. The population density was 78.5 inhabitants per square mile (30.3/km^{2}). The racial makeup of Cartago was 63 (68.5%) White, 0 (0.0%) African American, 7 (7.6%) Native American, 0 (0.0%) Asian, 0 (0.0%) Pacific Islander, 11 (12.0%) from other races, and 11 (12.0%) from two or more races. Hispanic or Latino of any race were 16 persons (17.4%).

The Census reported that 92 people (100% of the population) lived in households, 0 (0%) lived in non-institutionalized group quarters, and 0 (0%) were institutionalized.

There were 44 households, out of which 11 (25.0%) had children under the age of 18 living in them, 18 (40.9%) were opposite-sex married couples living together, 5 (11.4%) had a female householder with no husband present, 2 (4.5%) had a male householder with no wife present. There were 1 (2.3%) unmarried opposite-sex partnership, and 0 (0%) same-sex married couples or partnerships. 18 households (40.9%) were made up of individuals, and 4 (9.1%) had someone living alone who was 65 years of age or older. The average household size was 2.09. There were 25 families (56.8% of all households); the average family size was 2.88.

The population was spread out, with 19 people (20.7%) under the age of 18, 9 people (9.8%) aged 18 to 24, 18 people (19.6%) aged 25 to 44, 30 people (32.6%) aged 45 to 64, and 16 people (17.4%) who were 65 years of age or older. The median age was 45.0 years. For every 100 females, there were 124.4 males. For every 100 females age 18 and over, there were 135.5 males.

There were 55 housing units at an average density of 46.9 per square mile (18.1/km^{2}), of which 44 were occupied, of which 28 (63.6%) were owner-occupied, and 16 (36.4%) were occupied by renters. The homeowner vacancy rate was 0%; the rental vacancy rate was 0%. 58 people (63.0% of the population) lived in owner-occupied housing units and 34 people (37.0%) lived in rental housing units.

=== 2000 census ===
As of the census of 2000, there were 109 people, 40 households, and 25 families residing in the CDP. The population density was 68.7 inhabitants per square mile (26.5/km^{2}). There were 49 housing units at an average density of 30.9 per square mile (11.9/km^{2}). The racial makeup of the CDP was 76.15% White, 2.75% Native American, 20.18% from other races, and 0.92% from two or more races. 38.53% of the population were Hispanic or Latino of any race.

There were 40 households, out of which 37.5% had children under the age of 18 living with them, 40.0% were married couples living together, 15.0% had a female householder with no husband present, and 37.5% were non-families. 32.5% of all households were made up of individuals, and 12.5% had someone living alone who was 65 years of age or older. The average household size was 2.73 and the average family size was 3.36.

In the CDP, the population was spread out, with 31.2% under the age of 18, 9.2% from 18 to 24, 27.5% from 25 to 44, 19.3% from 45 to 64, and 12.8% who were 65 years of age or older. The median age was 28 years. For every 100 females, there were 142.2 males. For every 100 females age 18 and over, there were 127.3 males.

The median income for a household in the CDP was $34,375, and the median income for a family was $50,625. Males had a median income of $33,750 versus $7,083 for females. The per capita income for the CDP was $14,699. There were no families and 5.1% of the population living below the poverty line, including no under eighteens and 27.3% of those over 64.

== Politics ==
Cartago is served by the state legislature, Cartago is in the 4th senatorial district, represented by Republican Marie Alvarado-Gil, and the 8th Assembly district, represented by Republican David Tangipa.

Federally, Cartago is in California's 3rd congressional district, represented by Independent Kevin Kiley.

== Education ==
Cartago is served by the Lone Pine Unified School District. Lone Pine High School is the comprehensive high school of the district.
