= Lone Pine Unified School District =

School district in California

Address
- 301 South Hay Street Lone Pine, California, 93545; United States

District information
- Type: Public
- Grades: K–12
- NCES District ID: 0622440

Students and staff
- Students: 324
- Teachers: 17.57 (FTE)
- Staff: 20.69 (FTE)
- Student–teacher ratio: 18.44:1

Other information
- Website: www.lpusd.org

Lone Pine Unified School District, commonly abbreviated LPUSD, is located in Inyo County, California. It consists of two school sites.

The district includes Lone Pine, Cartago, Darwin, Keeler, Olancha, and Pearsonville.

== School sites ==
The district consists of two school sites:

- Lone Pine High School
- Lo-Inyo Elementary School
