= Lone Pine High School =

High school in California, United States

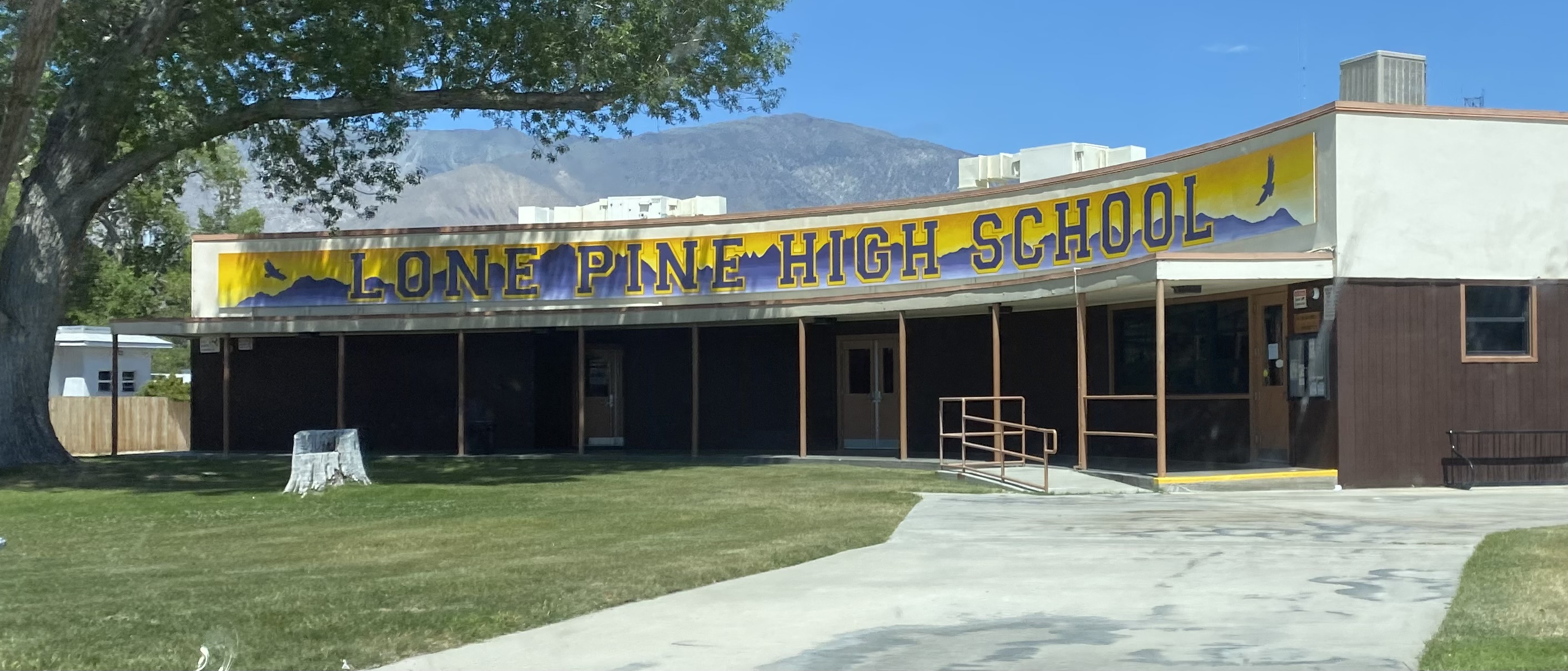

Location
- 538 South Main Street; Lone Pine, California 93545; United States; 36°36′07″N 118°03′39″W

Information
- Type: High School
- Established: 1916
- School district: Lone Pine Unified School District
- Principal: William Brown
- Teaching staff: 6.78 (on an FTE basis)
- Grades: 9-12
- Enrollment: 104 (2023-2024)
- Student to teacher ratio: 15.34
- Colors: Purple and Gold
- Athletics conference: Hi-Lo
- Nickname: Golden Eagles
- Website: lphs.lpusd.org

Lone Pine High School is a public high school in Lone Pine, California. It is a part of the Lone Pine Unified School District. The district includes Lone Pine, Cartago, Darwin, Keeler, Olancha, and Pearsonville.

It was established in 1916, making it one of the oldest active high schools in Inyo County. The first graduating class of the school was in 1920. The class of 2019 was the 100th graduating class in Lone Pine High School's history. It is the only high school in the census-designated place (CDP) of Lone Pine.

== Athletics ==
Lone Pine's school mascot is the golden eagle. But until the mid-1980s, the mascot and athletics team's were generally referred to as the Eagles, and the mascot was portrayed as a bald eagle. But a dead Golden Eagle was found not to far from the school and its body was taxidermied and put on display in the school's trophy case and the athletic teams began being called the Golden Eagles after that. In the early 1980s, there was a student vote on changing the school colors from Purple and Gold to Silver and Blue and rename the school's mascot from the Eagles to the Cowboy/Cowgirls, which was rejected by the students.

Lone Pine offers a variety of varsity sports, including football, volleyball, basketball (boys and girls), skiing and snowboarding, baseball, softball, golf, and track and field. The football team holds the longest losing streak in California high school football history. From 1975 to 1982, the Lone Pine Golden Eagles football team lost 55 straight games in the Desert-Inyo League, which they had been a member for many years. After the long losing streak and failing to win a single league title, starting at least in 1957, when other much larger schools joined in the Desert-Inyo League, the school ditched 11-man football for eight-man football in 1982 after being an 11-man team for most of its program's history and only seeing pockets of success over those years. They started facing smaller schools like Maricopa, Big Pine, and Owens Valley High School, as they could no longer compete with larger schools in the Desert-Inyo League that consisted of Tehachapi, Boron, Kern Valley, Trona, Bishop Union, Rosamond, Mojave, Desert Air Force Base, and Mammoth High School. Ironically enough, Mojave, Trona, and Mammoth High have all since become 8-man football teams as well, which has resulted in the return of the annual rivalry games between the 4 schools.

The football team has seen some moderate success as an 8-man team over the years, with their most successful seasons being in 1983, 1987, 1990, 1993,1994, 1998,2011 (their best season in many years with a record of 10–1) and 2019.

There have been some very good basketball teams as well over the school's history such as the 1994–95 team coached by Scott Kemp was the first boys team to win a league championship since 1950. It also began a string of six straight league championships from 1995-2000. Kemp also coached the 2013–16 teams that current European Basketball player and UC Irvine collegiate athlete, Bradley Greene played for. The early 2000s basketball teams saw some great success as well, led by Lone Pine High alumnus Wayne Geiger, who was later killed in action in Iraq in 2007.

The baseball team has had some great players and teams as well over the years. The school produced David Richardson, who in 1987 was drafted by the Minnesota Twins. He played for 2 seasons in the minor leagues as a pitcher.

The girls volleyball team made the playoffs every year from 1994 to 2010 and won several league titles in that span.

The girls softball teams of the early 1980s are usually credited for changing the culture of the program, which has since seen some very good teams since those days as well.

The school also had a rodeo team for many years. The team had most of its success in the late 1940s and early 1950s, led by several riders that were mostly of Hispanic descent, which led to some negative reactions from part of the town's population. However, the school has not had a rodeo team in quite some time, which had led to the team and its accomplishments being largely forgotten.
