= Keeler, California =

- Unincorporated community Census-designated place
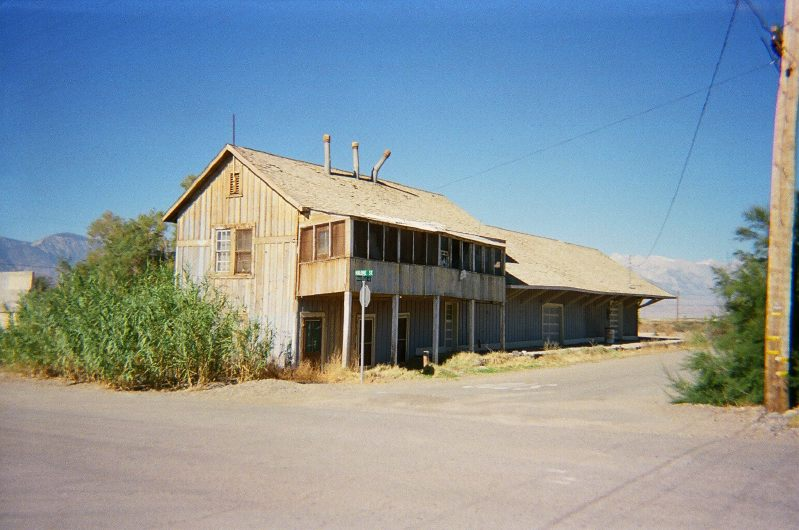
- Abandoned Carson and Colorado Railroad train depot in Keeler, CA

- Location in Inyo County and the state of California

- Location in the United States
- Coordinates: 36°29′40″N 117°53′02″W
- Country: United States
- State: California
- County: Inyo

Area
  - Total: 1.153 sq mi (2.986 km^{2})
  - Land: 1.153 sq mi (2.986 km^{2})
  - Water: 0 sq mi (0 km^{2}) 0%
- Elevation: 3,603 ft (1,098 m)

Population (2020)
  - Total: 71
  - Density: 62/sq mi (24/km^{2})
- Time zone: UTC-8 (Pacific (PST))
  - Summer (DST): UTC-7 (PDT)
- ZIP code: 93530
- Area codes: 442/760
- FIPS code: 06-37918
- GNIS feature ID: 2408466

Keeler, formerly known as Hawley, is an unincorporated community in Inyo County, California, United States. Keeler is located on the east shore of Owens Lake 11.5 miles (19 km) south-southeast of New York Butte. The population was 71 people at the 2020 census, up from 66 at the 2010 census. For statistical purposes, the United States Census Bureau has defined Keeler as a census-designated place (CDP).

== History ==
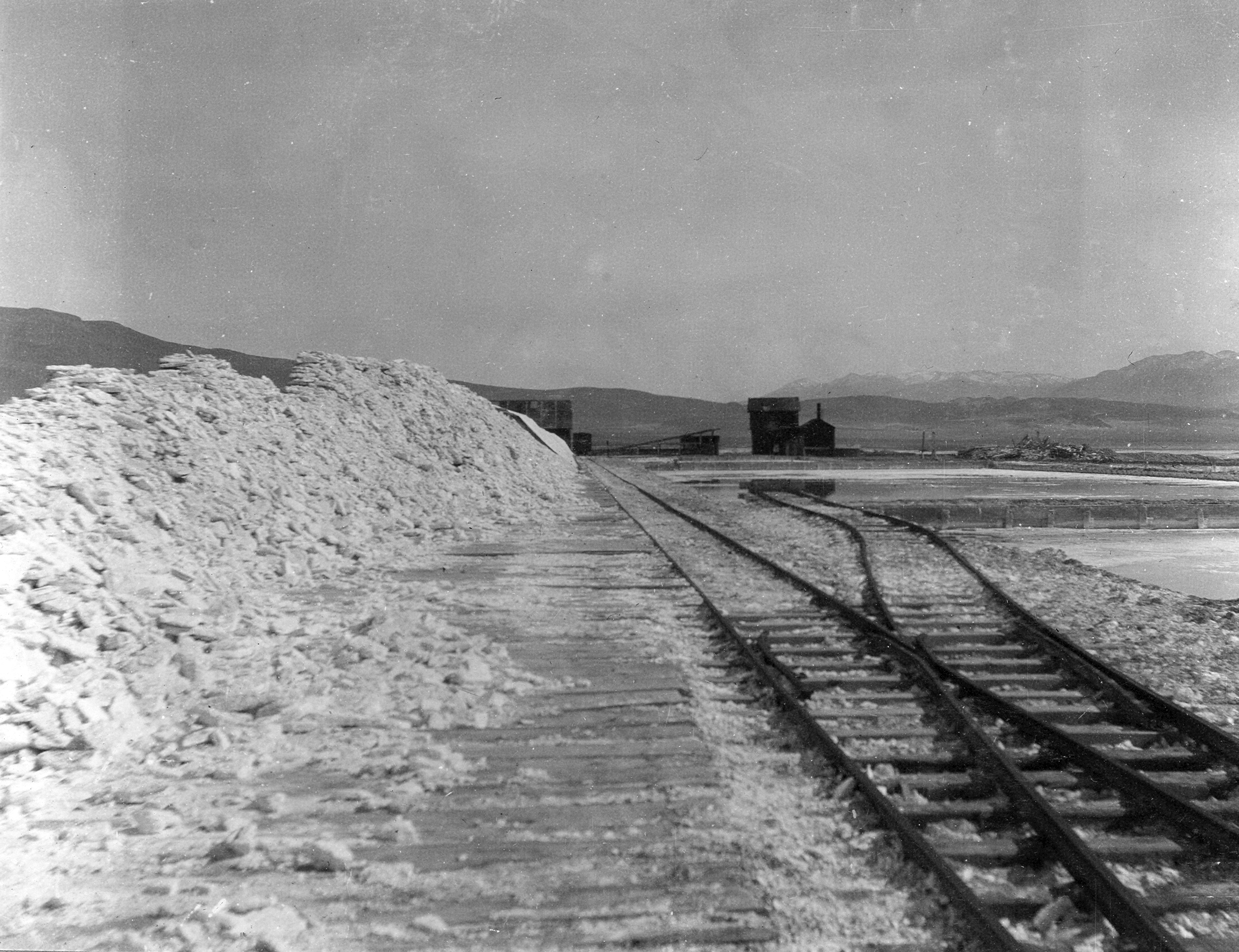
Soda works at Keeler, where a pile of carbonate of soda is ready for market

When the 1872 Lone Pine earthquake rendered the pier in nearby Swansea inaccessible by uplifting the shoreline, a new pier was constructed to the south at a community named Hawley. In 1880 a new mill was constructed at Hawley by the Owens Lake Mining and Milling Company for processing silver ore from the Cerro Gordo Mines in the mountains to the east. A town was laid out by the company agent Julius M. Keeler, for whom the town of Hawley was later renamed.

The steamship Bessie Brady brought ore from Keeler across the lake to the town of Cartago. There was a 300-foot wharf (91 m) at Keeler, and the steamship route cut days off the time a freight wagon would have taken to circle the lake. She carried 700 ingots at a time in a three-hour crossing, but in 1882 the Bessie Brady was destroyed by fire. The Carson and Colorado Railroad constructed a narrow-gauge railway to Keeler in 1883. The success of the Cerro Gordo mines caused Keeler to boom until silver prices plummeted in the late 19th century.

A second boom of zinc mining in the early 20th century brought new life to the town and an aerial cable tramway was built to bring the ore from Cerro Gordo to Keeler. There were small surges in the mining of silver, lead, zinc and limestone, but by the 1950s all mining had ceased. Train service was stopped in 1960 and the tracks were removed in 1961. Water exports from the Owens Valley to the City of Los Angeles in the 1920s led the Owens Lake to eventually dry up, causing alkali dust storms to blow through Keeler, driving many residents away. Dust remediation efforts in the early 21st century reduced this problem, but few residents remain.

A post office operated at Keeler from 1883 to 1898 and is still operating today.

There is a California Historical Landmark in Keeler for the furnace of the Owens Lake Silver Company.

== Geography ==
According to the United States Census Bureau, the CDP has a total area of 1.2 square miles (3.1 km^{2}), all land.

Keeler is located along the eastern shores of Owens Lake (a dry lakebed) along State Route 136.

== Demographics ==
Historical population
Census	Pop.	Note	%±
2000	66		—
2010	66		0.0%
2020	71		7.6%
U.S. Decennial Census; 1860–1870 1880-1890; 1900 1910 1920; 1930 1940 1950; 1960 1970 1980; 1990 2000 2010

Keeler first appeared as a census-designated place in the 2000 U.S. census.

=== Racial and ethnic composition ===
Keeler CDP, California – Racial and ethnic composition Note: the US Census treats Hispanic/Latino as an ethnic category. This table excludes Latinos from the racial categories and assigns them to a separate category. Hispanics/Latinos may be of any race.
Race / Ethnicity (NH = Non-Hispanic)	Pop 2000	Pop 2010	Pop 2020	% 2000	% 2010	% 2020
White alone (NH)	57	58	51	86.36%	87.88%	71.83%
Black or African American alone (NH)	0	0	0	0.00%	0.00%	0.00%
Native American or Alaska Native alone (NH)	0	0	0	0.00%	0.00%	0.00%
Asian alone (NH)	0	2	0	0.00%	3.03%	0.00%
Native Hawaiian or Pacific Islander alone (NH)	0	0	0	0.00%	0.00%	0.00%
Other race alone (NH)	0	0	0	0.00%	0.00%	0.00%
Mixed race or Multiracial (NH)	1	0	7	1.52%	0.00%	9.86%
Hispanic or Latino (any race)	8	6	13	12.12%	9.09%	18.31%
Total	66	66	71	100.00%	100.00%	100.00%

=== 2020 ===
The 2020 United States census reported that Keeler had a population of 71. The population density was 61.6 inhabitants per square mile (23.8/km^{2}). The racial makeup of Keeler was 55 (77%) White, 0 (0%) African American, 1 (1%) Native American, 0 (0%) Asian, 0 (0%) Pacific Islander, 2 (3%) from other races, and 13 (18%) from two or more races. Hispanic or Latino of any race were 13 persons (18%).

The whole population lived in households. There were 36 households, out of which 5 (14%) had children under the age of 18 living in them, 14 (38.9%) were married-couple households, 5 (14%) were cohabiting couple households, 7 (19%) had a female householder with no partner present, and 10 (28%) had a male householder with no partner present. 7 households (19%) were one person, and 3 (8%) were one person aged 65 or older. The average household size was 1.97. There were 20 families (56% of all households).

The age distribution was 5 people (7%) under the age of 18, 2 people (3%) aged 18 to 24, 7 people (10%) aged 25 to 44, 29 people (41%) aged 45 to 64, and 28 people (39%) who were 65 years of age or older. The median age was 61.4 years. There were 32 males and 39 females.

There were 66 housing units at an average density of 57.2 units per square mile (22.1 units/km^{2}), of which 36 (55%) were occupied. Of these, 27 (75%) were owner-occupied, and 9 (25%) were occupied by renters.

=== 2010 ===
At the 2010 census Keeler had a population of 66. The population density was 50.7 inhabitants per square mile (19.6/km^{2}). The racial makeup of Keeler was 63 (96%) White, 0 African American, 0 Native American, 2 (3%) Asian, 0 Pacific Islander, 0 from other races, and 1 (2%) from two or more races. Hispanic or Latino of any race were six people (9%).

The census reported that 100% of the population lived in households.

There were 40 households; four (10%) had children under the age of 18 living in them, 13 (33%) were opposite-sex married couples living together, two (5%) had a female householder with no husband present and two (5%) had a male householder with no wife present. There were no unmarried opposite-sex partnerships, and no same-sex married couples or partnerships. Twenty three households (58%) were one person, and 12 (30%) had someone living alone who was 65 or older. The average household size was 1.7. There were 17 families (43% of households); the average family size was 2.5.

The age distribution was nine people (14%) under the age of 18, one person (2%) aged 18 to 24, one person (2%) aged 25 to 44, 33 people (50%) aged 45 to 64, and 22 people (33%) who were 65 or older. The median age was 59.3 years. Pro rata, for every 100 females, there were 120.0 males. For every 100 females age 18 and over, there were 147.8 males.

There were 67 housing units at an average density of 51.5 per square mile (19.9/km^{2}), of which 40 were occupied, of which 33 (83%) were owner-occupied, and 7 (18%) were occupied by renters. The homeowner vacancy rate was 3%; the rental vacancy rate was 22%. 55 people (83% of the population) lived in owner-occupied housing units and 11 people (17%) lived in rental housing units.

== Government ==
In the state legislature, Keeler is in the 4th senatorial district, represented by Republican Marie Alvarado-Gil, and the 8th Assembly district, represented by Republican David Tangipa.

Federally, Keeler is in California's 3rd congressional district, represented by Independent Kevin Kiley.

== Education ==
Keeler is served by the Lone Pine Unified School District. Lone Pine High School is the comprehensive high school of the district.

== In popular culture ==
Keeler appears in films such as Outlaws of the Desert (1941), Sinister Journey (1948) and The Blazing Sun (1950).

== See also ==
- California Water Wars
