= Olancha, California =

Census-designated place in California, United States

Olancha
- Unincorporated Community; Census Designated Place
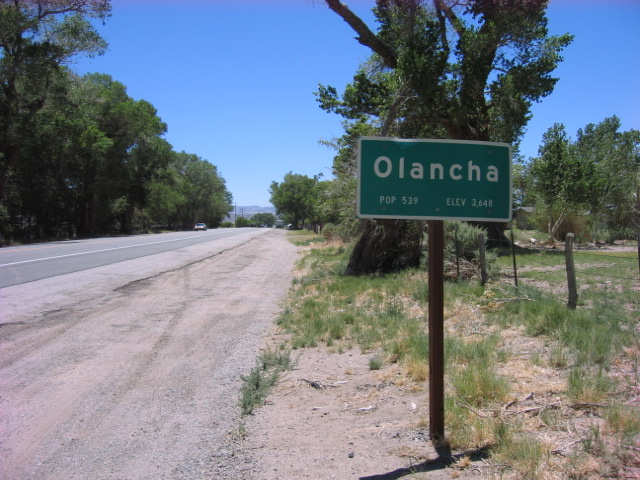
- Entrance sign, southbound

- Location in Inyo County and the state of California

- Location in the United States
- Coordinates: 36°16′48″N 118°00′18″W
- Country: United States
- State: California
- County: Inyo

Area
  - Total: 7.873 sq mi (20.392 km^{2})
  - Land: 7.843 sq mi (20.312 km^{2})
  - Water: 0.031 sq mi (0.080 km^{2}) 0.39%
- Elevation: 3,698 ft (1,127 m)

Population (2020)
  - Total: 131
- Time zone: UTC-8 (Pacific)
  - Summer (DST): UTC-7 (PDT)
- ZIP code: 93549
- Area codes: 442/760
- FIPS code: 06-53490
- GNIS feature ID: 2408982

California Historical Landmark
- Official name: Farley's Olancha Mill Site
- Reference no.: 796

Olancha (Timbisha: Pakwa' si) is a census-designated place in Inyo County, California, United States. Olancha is located on U.S. Route 395, 37 miles (60 km) south-southeast of Independence. As of the 2020 census, the population was 131, down from 192 at the 2010 census.

Located in the Owens Valley next to the now mostly dry Owens Lake, the arid settlement is home to a major bottled water plant for Crystal Geyser Natural Alpine Spring Water.

== Geography ==
Olancha is an unincorporated community located in the Owens Valley on the eastern slope of the Sierra Nevada mountain range at the elevation of 3,650 feet (1,110 m), in Inyo County. It was formerly on US Highway 395 near the junction of State Route 190, when it was bypassed by the Olancha and Cartago Expressway. Owens Lake lies to the northeast of Olancha. Olancha Creek flows from the slopes of nearby Olancha Peak (12,123 ft), passing near the town of Olancha, and finally towards Owens Lake. To the east of town lie some sand dunes, as well as a hot spring known as "Dirty Socks".

According to the United States Census Bureau, the CDP has a total area of 7.9 square miles (20 km^{2}), over 99% of which is land.

=== Climate ===
According to the Köppen Climate Classification system, Olancha has a cold semi-arid climate, abbreviated "BSk" on climate maps due to it being in the rainshadow of the Sierra Nevada.

== History ==
Olancha was established by Minnard Farley, who came to the area in 1860 and discovered silver ore in the nearby Coso Range. The name "Olancha" is believed to be derived from the nearby Yaudanche tribe. For processing the ore, he built a stamp mill just south of Olancha Creek. The remains of a stone wall from this mill still exists and has been designated as a California Historical Site (marker #796).

The first post office at Olancha opened in 1870.

On August 11, 1969, Manson Family members Charles "Tex" Watson and Dianne "Snake" Lake settled down in Olancha two days after Watson had stabbed Sharon Tate to death. Here, Watson bought a newspaper revealing that it still was a mystery who committed the Manson murders and confessed to Lake: "I killed her, Charlie (Manson) ordered me to do so, it was fun". This fact was witnessed by Lake during the Watson trial in 1971. Lake was shortly put into custody in Independence after complaints from Olancha residents for swimming nude. After a few weeks, the two of them left Olancha for the final Manson hideout in Death Valley.

The Olancha and Cartago Expressway is a 12.6 mile, 4-lane controlled-access expressway that serves as U.S. Route 395 from 4 miles south-southeast of Olancha to the nearby town of Cartago. The expressway completely bypasses Olancha, completing the U.S. Route 395 corridor in Inyo County. Construction started on the expressway in January 2022 and was completed in October 2025, celebrated with a ribbon cutting ceremony. Southbound traffic was moved to the new southbound lanes on October 7, 2024, and northbound on November 19, 2024.

== California Historical Landmark ==
Farley's Olancha Mill Site is a California Historical Landmark number 796, assigned on September 16, 1964, on U.S. Route 395 in California in Olancha, California.

The California Historical Landmark reads:

NO. 796 FARLEY'S OLANCHA MILL SITE - In 1860, while working for the Silver Mountain Mining Company in the Coso Mountains, M. H. Farley conceived the idea of building a processing mill on a creek that flowed into Owens Lake. He explored and named Olancha Pass that year, and by December 1862 had completed the first mill and furnace in the Owens River Valley, on Olancha Creek about one mile west of this marker.

== Demographics ==
Historical population
Census	Pop.	Note	%±
2000	134		—
2010	192		43.3%
2020	131		−31.8%
U.S. Decennial Census; 1860–1870 1880-1890; 1900 1910 1920; 1930 1940 1950; 1960 1970 1980; 1990 2000 2010

Olancha first appeared as a census designated place in the 2000 U.S. census.

=== Racial and ethnic composition ===
Olancha CDP, California – Racial and ethnic composition Note: the US Census treats Hispanic/Latino as an ethnic category. This table excludes Latinos from the racial categories and assigns them to a separate category. Hispanics/Latinos may be of any race.
Race / Ethnicity (NH = Non-Hispanic)	Pop 2000	Pop 2010	Pop 2020	% 2000	% 2010	% 2020
White alone (NH)	78	128	78	58.21%	66.67%	59.54%
Black or African American alone (NH)	0	0	3	0.00%	0.00%	2.29%
Native American or Alaska Native alone (NH)	1	3	5	0.75%	1.56%	3.82%
Asian alone (NH)	0	8	0	0.00%	4.17%	0.00%
Native Hawaiian or Pacific Islander alone (NH)	0	0	0	0.00%	0.00%	0.00%
Other race alone (NH)	0	0	0	0.00%	0.00%	0.00%
Mixed race or Multiracial (NH)	5	6	10	3.73%	3.13%	7.63%
Hispanic or Latino (any race)	50	47	35	37.31%	24.48%	26.72%
Total	134	192	131	100.00%	100.00%	100.00%

=== 2020 ===
The 2020 United States census reported that Olancha had a population of 131. The population density was 16.7 inhabitants per square mile (6.4/km^{2}). The racial makeup of Olancha was 90 (68.7%) White, 3 (2.3%) African American, 7 (5.3%) Native American, 0 (0.0%) Asian, 0 (0.0%) Pacific Islander, 18 (13.7%) from other races, and 13 (9.9%) from two or more races. Hispanic or Latino of any race were 35 persons (26.7%).

The whole population lived in households. There were 64 households, out of which 14 (21.9%) had children under the age of 18 living in them, 18 (28.1%) were married-couple households, 3 (4.7%) were cohabiting couple households, 11 (17.2%) had a female householder with no partner present, and 32 (50.0%) had a male householder with no partner present. 31 households (48.4%) were one person, and 19 (29.7%) were one person aged 65 or older. The average household size was 2.05. There were 26 families (40.6% of all households).

The age distribution was 14 people (10.7%) under the age of 18, 6 people (4.6%) aged 18 to 24, 18 people (13.7%) aged 25 to 44, 47 people (35.9%) aged 45 to 64, and 46 people (35.1%) who were 65 years of age or older. The median age was 57.8 years. There were 68 males and 63 females.

There were 81 housing units at an average density of 10.3 units per square mile (4.0 units/km^{2}), of which 64 (79.0%) were occupied. Of these, 50 (78.1%) were owner-occupied, and 14 (21.9%) were occupied by renters.

=== 2010 ===
The 2010 United States Census reported that Olancha had a population of 192. The population density was 24.4 people per square mile (9.4/km^{2}). The racial makeup of Olancha was 133 (69.3%) White, 0 (0.0%) African American, 4 (2.1%) Native American, 8 (4.2%) Asian, 0 (0.0%) Pacific Islander, 38 (19.8%) from other races, and 9 (4.7%) from two or more races. Hispanic or Latino of any race were 47 persons (24.5%).

The Census reported that 192 people (100% of the population) lived in households, 0 (0%) lived in non-institutionalized group quarters, and 0 (0%) were institutionalized.

There were 78 households, out of which 23 (29.5%) had children under the age of 18 living in them, 44 (56.4%) were opposite-sex married couples living together, 1 (1.3%) had a female householder with no husband present, 5 (6.4%) had a male householder with no wife present. There were 7 (9.0%) unmarried opposite-sex partnerships, and 0 (0%) same-sex married couples or partnerships. 22 households (28.2%) were made up of individuals, and 6 (7.7%) had someone living alone who was 65 years of age or older. The average household size was 2.46. There were 50 families (64.1% of all households); the average family size was 3.10.

The population was spread out, with 44 people (22.9%) under the age of 18, 9 people (4.7%) aged 18 to 24, 37 people (19.3%) aged 25 to 44, 69 people (35.9%) aged 45 to 64, and 33 people (17.2%) who were 65 years of age or older. The median age was 47.2 years. For every 100 females, there were 115.7 males. For every 100 females age 18 and over, there were 120.9 males.

There were 97 housing units at an average density of 12.3 per square mile (4.8/km^{2}), of which 78 were occupied, of which 44 (56.4%) were owner-occupied, and 34 (43.6%) were occupied by renters. The homeowner vacancy rate was 2.2%; the rental vacancy rate was 2.9%. 108 people (56.3% of the population) lived in owner-occupied housing units and 84 people (43.8%) lived in rental housing units.

=== 2000 ===
As of the census of 2000, the median income for a household in the CDP was $30,000, and the median income for a family was $46,250. Males had a median income of $31,250 versus $26,250 for females. The per capita income for the CDP was $18,124. There were 4.5% of families and 9.4% of the population living below the poverty line, including 17.2% of under eighteens and none of those over 64.

== Politics ==
In the state legislature, Olancha is in the 4th senatorial district, represented by Republican Marie Alvarado-Gil, and the 8th Assembly district, represented by Republican David Tangipa.

Federally, Olancha is in California's 3rd congressional district, represented by Independent Kevin Kiley.

== Education ==
Olancha is served by the Lone Pine Unified School District. Lone Pine High School is the comprehensive high school of the district.

== See also ==
- California Historical Landmarks in Inyo County
