= Owens Lake =

Dry lake in the Owens Valley, California

- Patsiata (Mono)
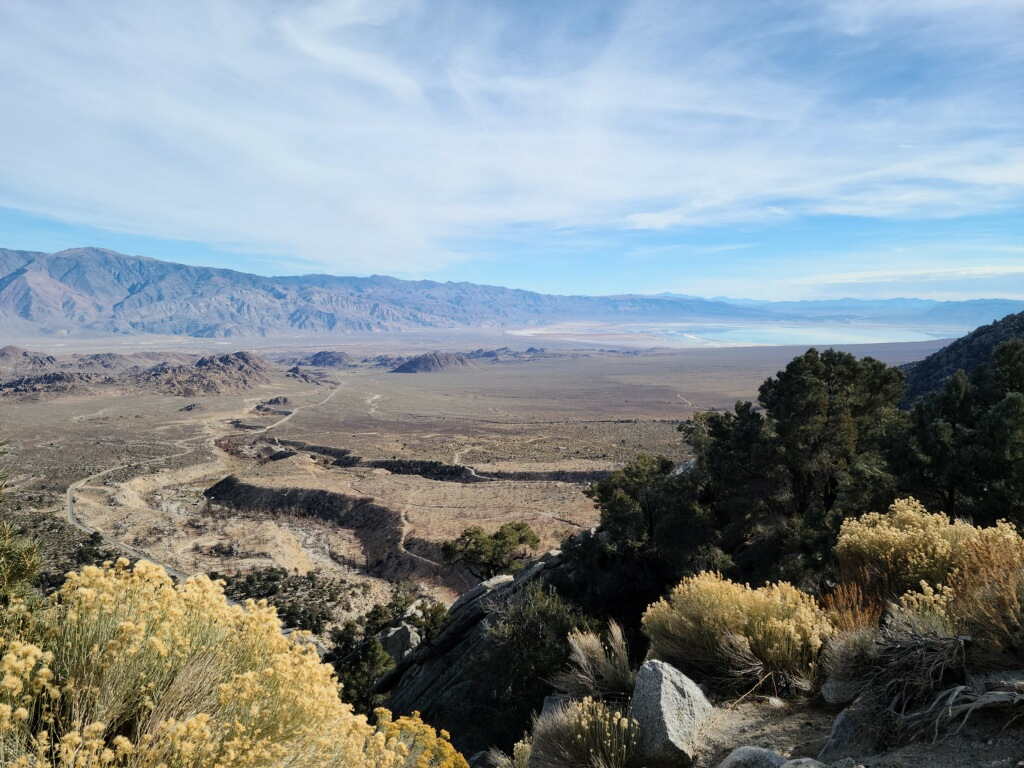
- View of partially-filled Owens Lake (top-right) from Whitney Portal

- Location within California
- Location: Sierra Nevada; Inyo County, California, United States
- Coordinates: 36.4332°N 117.9509°W
- Type: Flat
- Primary inflows: Owens River; Natural springs and wells
- Basin countries: United States
- Max. length: 17.5 mi (28.2 km)
- Max. width: 10 mi (16 km)
- Max. depth: 3 ft (0.91 m)
- Surface elevation: 3,556 ft (1,084 m)
- References: GNIS feature ID 272820

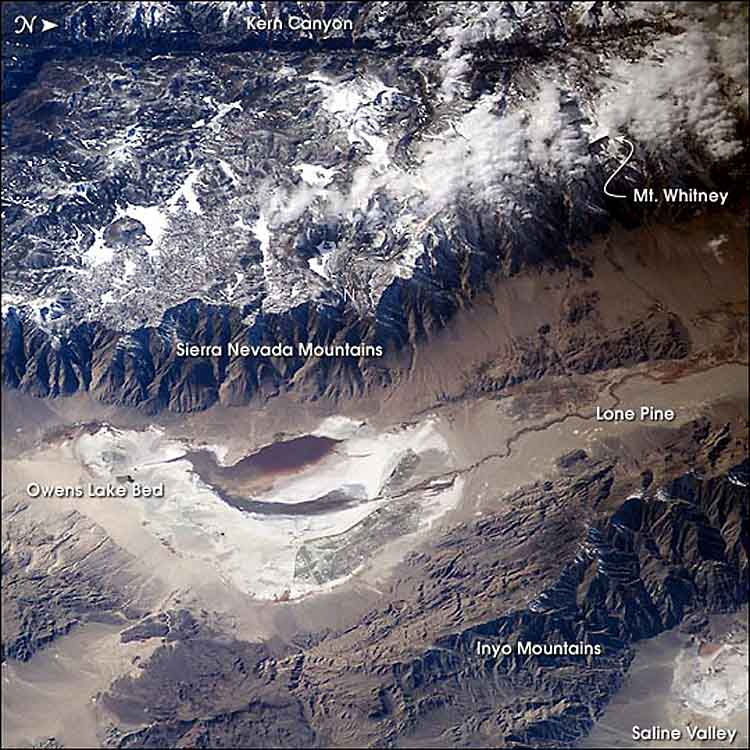
Image of the Owens Valley from the International Space Station – oriented top = true west

Owens Lake or Patsiata is a dry lake in the Owens Valley on the eastern side of the Sierra Nevada in Inyo County, California. It is about 5 miles (8.0 km) south of Lone Pine. Unlike most dry lakes in the Basin and Range Province that have been dry for thousands of years, Owens held significant water until 1913, when much of the Owens River was diverted into the Los Angeles Aqueduct, causing the lake to desiccate by 1926. In 2006, 5% of the water flow was restored. As of 2013, it is the largest single source of dust pollution in the United States, and has been known since at least the 1990s as a pervasive source of fine alkaline dust containing harmful levels of particulates and chemicals.

== History ==
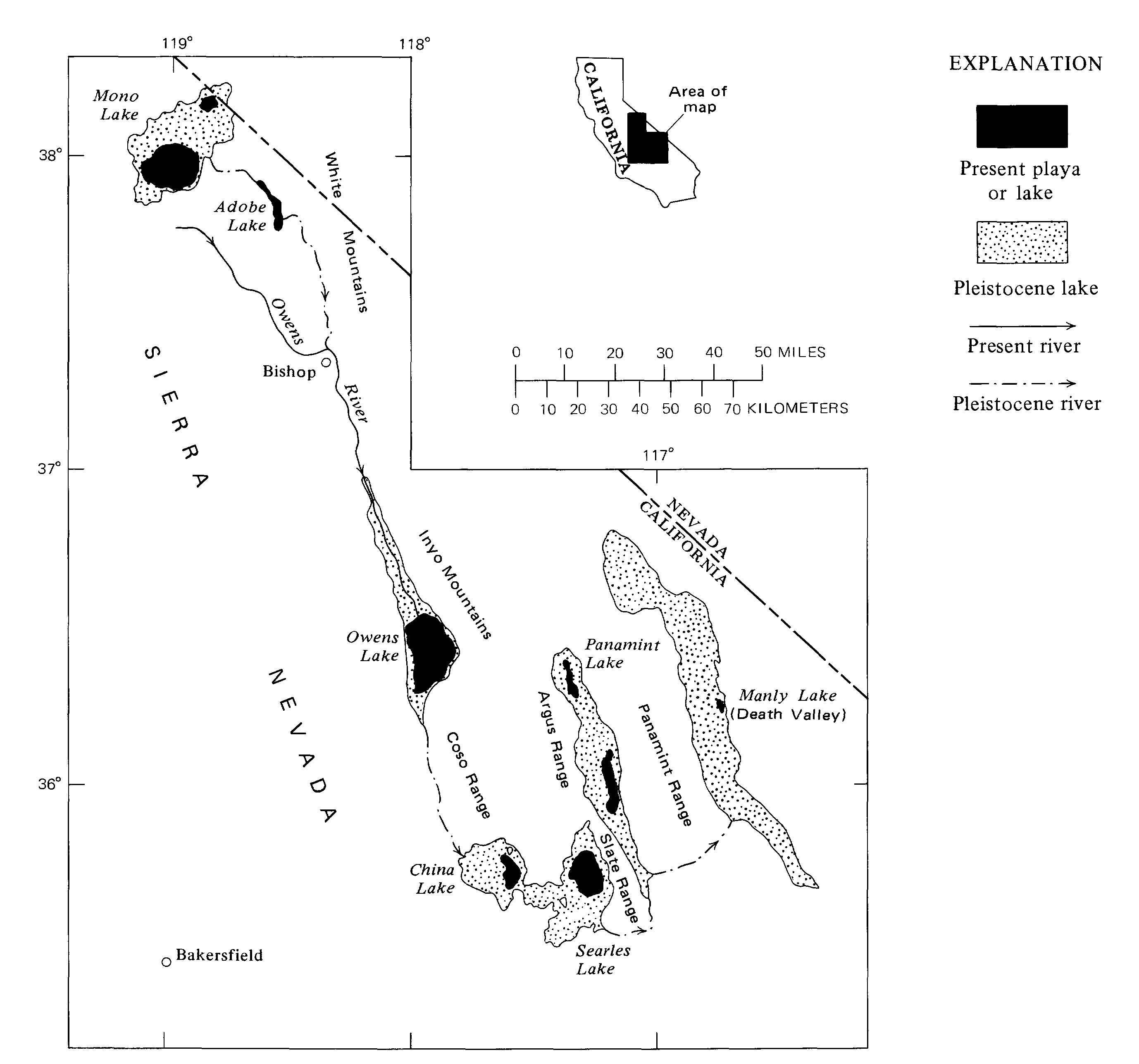
Map showing the system of once-interconnected Pleistocene lakes in eastern California (USGS)

=== Early history ===
During the late Pleistocene, Owens Lake reached a depth of 200 feet (61 m) and formed part of an interconnected series of seven lakes, hundreds of miles long. From north to south, these Pleistocene lakes were Lake Russell (present-day Mono Lake), Adobe Lake, Owens Lake, Lake Manly, Lake Panamint, China Lake, and Searles Lake. The increased inflow from the Owens River, from melting glaciers of the Tioga glaciation of the Sierra Nevada, caused Owens Lake to overflow south through Rose Valley into another now-dry lake bed named China Lake in the Indian Wells Valley, near Ridgecrest and a town that sports its name.

=== 19th century ===
Owens Lake was given its present name by the explorer John C. Frémont, in honor of one of his guides, Richard Owens. The lake is called Patsiata by the Mono people.

In the late 1800s and early 1900s, the depth of the lake varied between 7 and 15 metres (23 and 49 ft), covering an area of around 280 square kilometres (110 mi^{2}), and sometimes overflowed to the south, after which the water would flow into the Mojave Desert.

=== 20th century ===
By 1905, the lake's water was "excessively saline". Starting in 1913, the river and streams that fed Owens Lake were diverted by the Los Angeles Department of Water and Power (LADWP) into the Los Angeles Aqueduct, and the water level in the lake quickly dropped. As the lake dried, soda processing at nearby Keeler, California, switched from relatively cheap chemical methods to more expensive physical ones. The Natural Soda Products Company sued the city of Los Angeles and built a new plant with a $15,000 settlement. A fire destroyed this plant shortly after it was built, but the company rebuilt it on the dry lake bed in the 1920s.

During the unusually wet winter of 1937, LADWP diverted water from the aqueduct into the lake bed, flooding the soda plant. Because of this, the courts ordered the city to pay $154,000 in restitution. In 1941, LADWP built the Long Valley Dam, which created Crowley Lake for flood management.

=== 21st century ===
A 2004 court order required LADWP to reestablish some flow from the river into the lake. In winter 2006, LADWP restored 5% of the pre-aqueduct flow to the river by court order, allowing the Owens River Gorge, the river bed in the valley, and Owens Lake to contain a small amount of water. The lake was the epicenter of a magnitude 5.8 earthquake that occurred on June 24, 2020.

In 2022, the Great Basin Unified Air Pollution Control District successfully sued LADWP for the department's refusal to implement "low-impact" pollution controls at Owens Lake in an area with sensitive Native American cultural resources.

Numerous storms struck California during the first three months of 2023, causing a major breach of the aqueduct in March, which in turn increased the volume of the lake from 5,000 acre-feet to about 50,000 acre-feet. Tropical Storm Hilary inflicted further damage in August, submerging dust control systems throughout the lake bed.

As of 2024, environmental groups are working with leaders of the indigenous community in hopes of keeping more water in the lake.

== Mineralogy ==
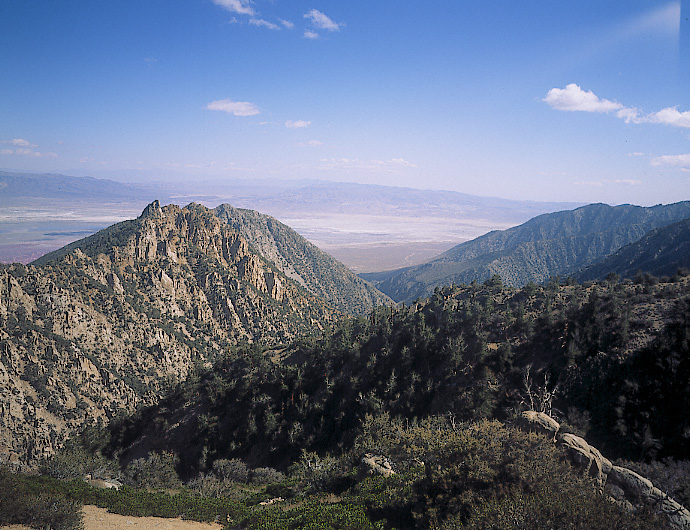
Owens Lake from the Horseshoe Meadows Road

The lake is a large salt flat whose surface is made of a mixture of clay, sand, and a variety of minerals including halite, burkeite, mirabilite, thénardite, and trona. In wet years, a small brine pond forms within the dry lake. On especially hot summer days when ground temperatures exceed 150° F (66 °C), water is driven out of the hydrates on the lake bed creating a muddy brine. Periodic winds stir up noxious alkali dust storms that carry away as much as four million tons (3.6 million metric tons) of dust from the lake bed each year, causing respiratory problems in nearby residents. The dust contains toxic metals and metalloids such as cadmium, nickel, and arsenic.

== Management ==
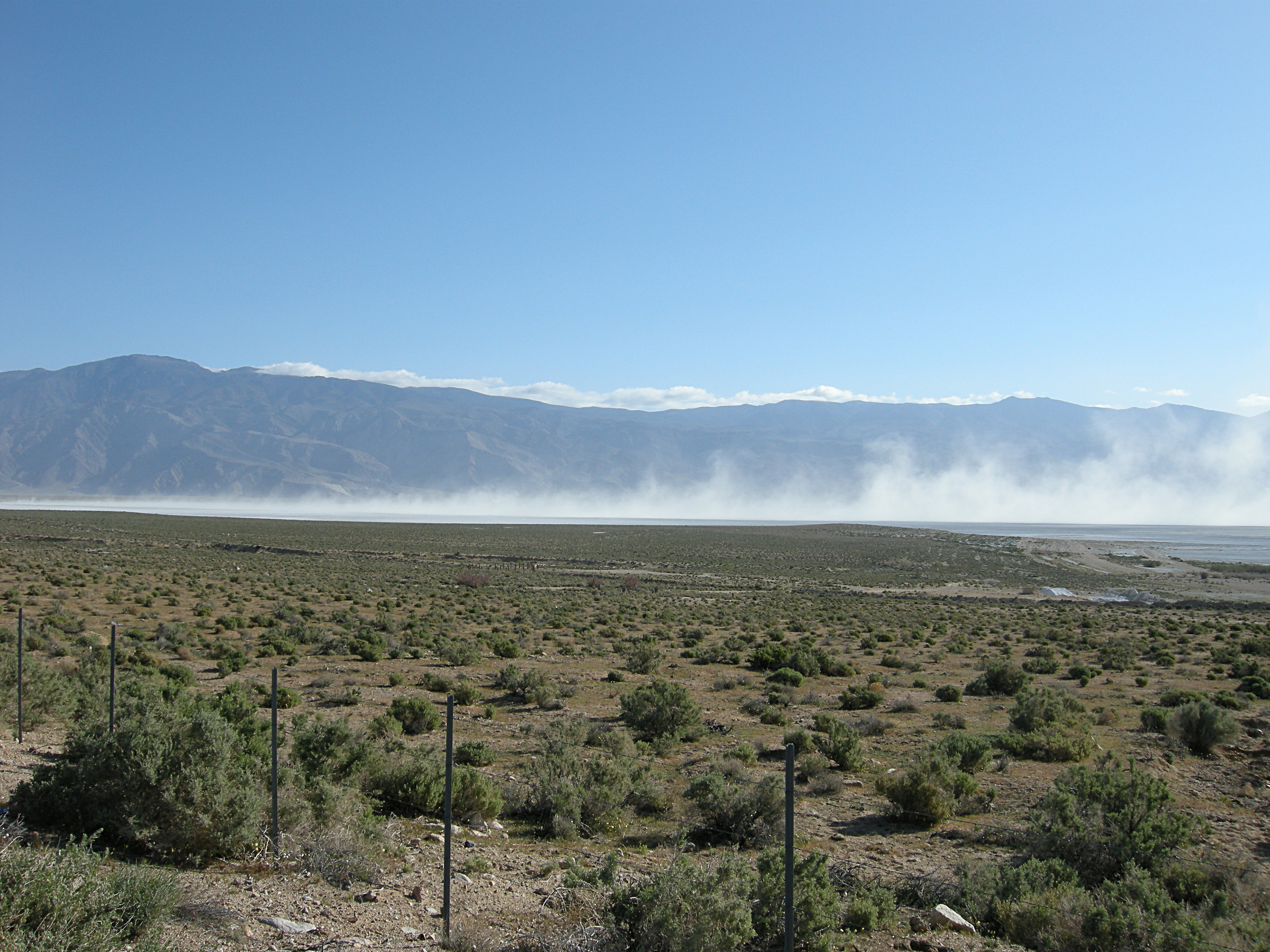
Alkali dust storm at Owens Lake

The LADWP and the California State Lands Commission own most of the Owens Lake bed; only a few small parcels along the historic western shoreline are privately owned.

In 2004, the California Department of Fish and Wildlife (CDFW) acquired a 218-acre (88 ha) parcel in Cartago, at the southern end of Owens Lake. Designated the Cartago Wildlife Area in 2007, it is one of the few remaining spring and wetland areas on the shore of Owens Lake. The site is open year-round for birdwatching and wildlife observation. The ruins of the late 19th century Cottonwood Creek charcoal kilns, and a historic soda ash plant operated by PPG Industries from 1928 until 1958 are located on US Route 395, just north of the Cartago Wildlife Area.

As part of an air pollution mitigation settlement, LADWP is shallow flooding 27 square miles (69.9 km^{2}) of the salt pan in an effort to minimize alkali dust storms and the associated adverse health effects. There are also about 3.5 square miles (9.1 km^{2}) of managed vegetation being used as a dust control measure. The vegetation consists of saltgrass, which is a native perennial grass highly tolerant of the salt and borate levels in the lake sediments. Gravel covers are also used.

== Ecology ==
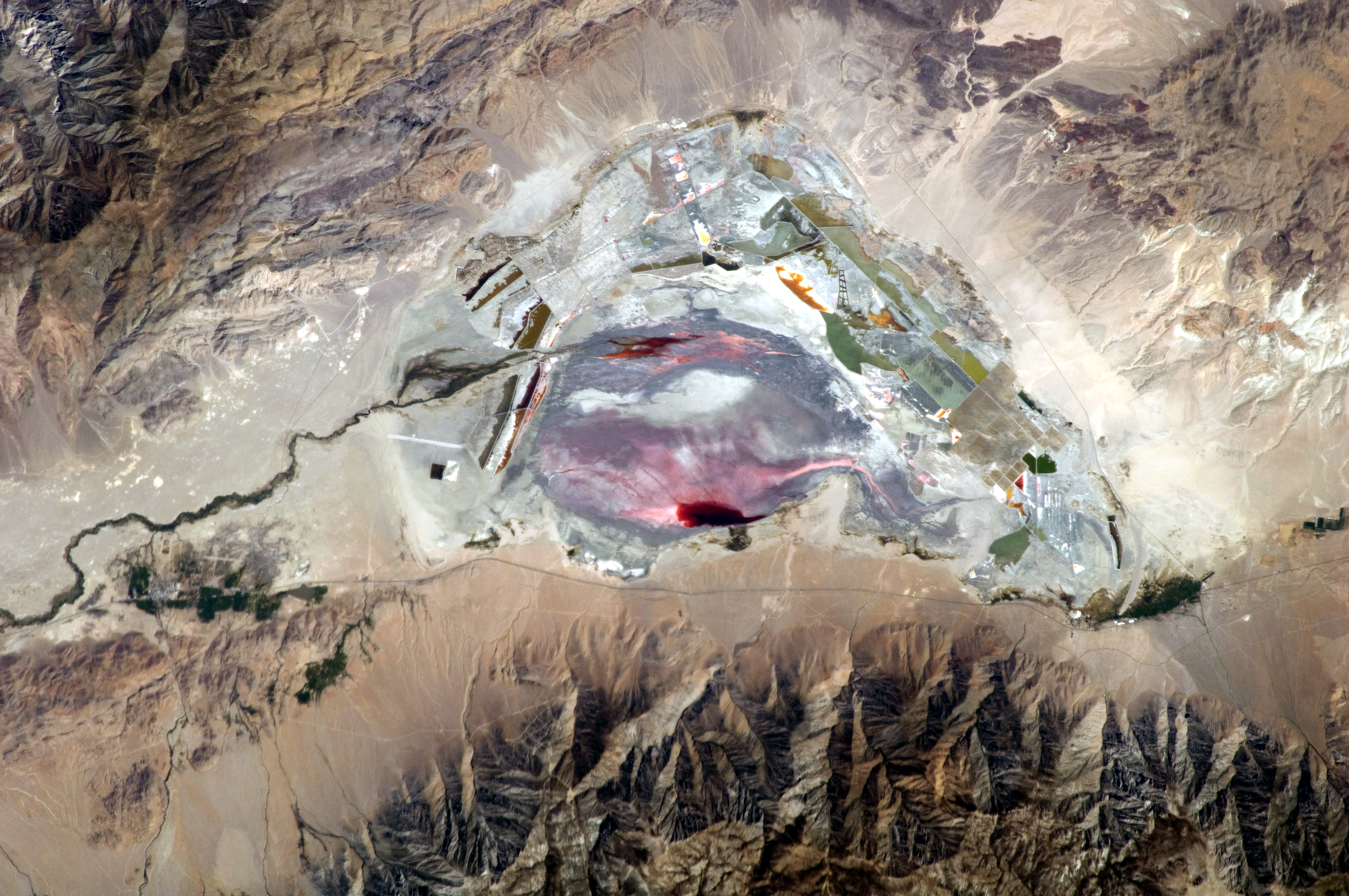
This astronaut photograph shows the mostly dry bed of Owens Lake

Owens Lake has long been an important place for birds to rest, feed, and breed. During a visit to Owens Lake in 1917, Joseph Grinnell from the Museum of Vertebrate Zoology in Berkeley reported, "Great numbers of water birds are in sight along the lake shore--avocets, phalaropes, ducks. Large flocks of shorebirds in flight over the water in the distance, wheeling about show in mass, now silvery now dark, against the gray-blue of the water. There must be literally thousands of birds within sight of this one spot".

Despite its near total obliteration, Owens Lake remains recognized as an Important Bird Area by the National Audubon Society. At the shore, a chain of wetlands, fed by springs and artesian wells, keep part of the former Owens Lake ecosystem alive.

Snowy plovers nest at Owens along with several thousand snow geese and ducks. As a result of dust mitigation efforts, shallow flooding of the lake bed has created habitats approximately 3 feet (0.9 m) deep. This water, although seasonally applied, is helping to buoy the lake's ecosystem. There are no current plans to restore Owens Lake to the condition it was in prior to the construction of the Los Angeles Aqueduct.

On April 19, 2008, the Eastern Sierra Audubon Society, Audubon California, and the Owens Valley Committee held the first lake-wide survey of the bird populations of Owens Lake. Volunteers recorded a total of 112 avian species and 45,650 individual birds — the highest total number of birds ever officially recorded at Owens Lake. Volunteers identified 15 species of waterfowl (ducks and geese) and 22 species of shorebirds. The highest totals for individuals of a species included 13,873 California gulls (an inland nester at Mono Lake and elsewhere); 9,218 American avocets; 1,767 eared grebes; 13,826 peeps (stints and sandpipers); and 2,882 ducks.

At times, when the salt concentration in the water increases to concentrations near where salt crystals begin to form, bright pink halophilic (salt-loving) archaea spread across the lake bed.

== Industry ==
=== Cerro Gordo Mines ===
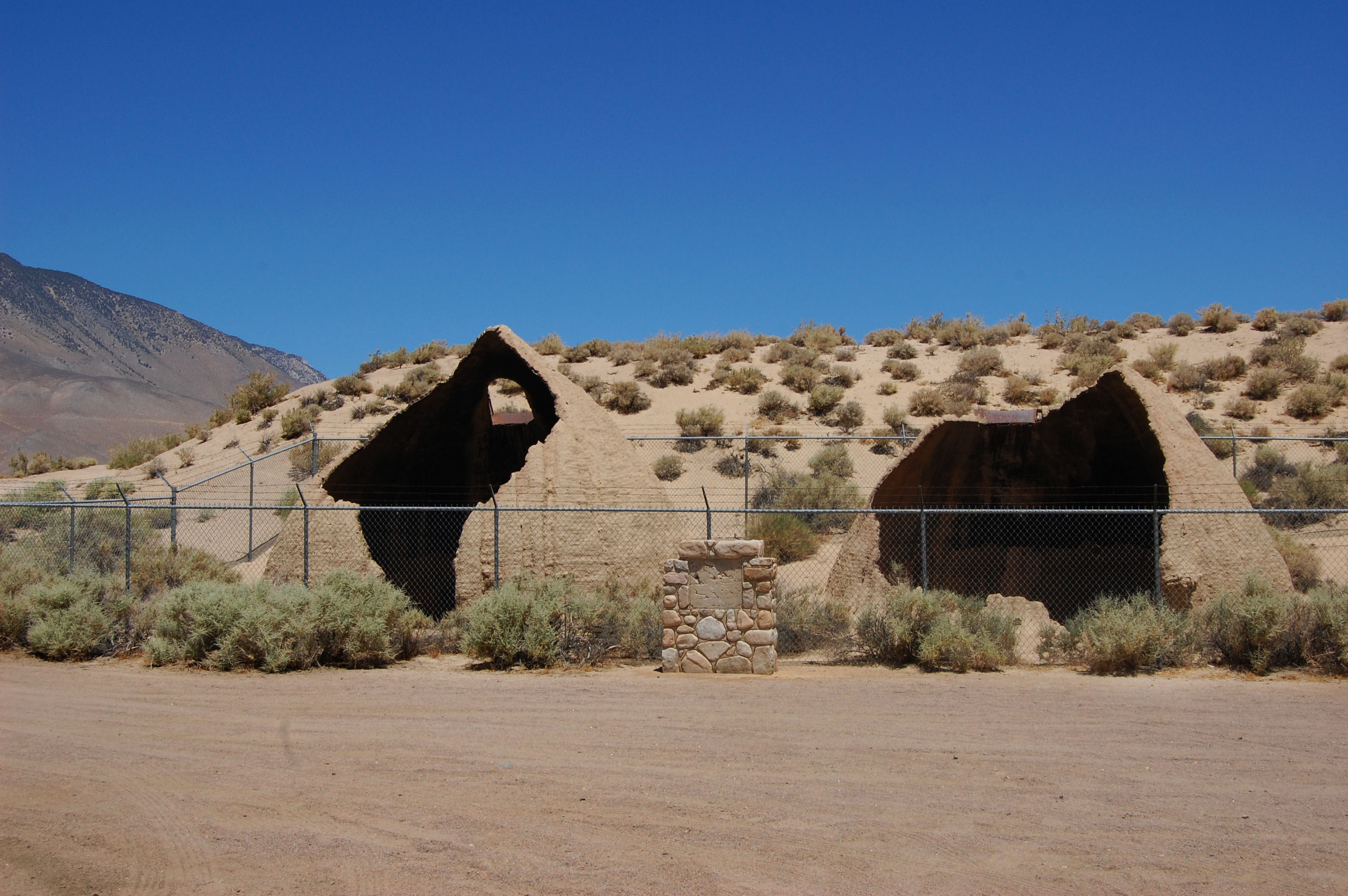
The remains of the Cottonwood charcoal kilns

In the late 19th century, the town of Cartago was located on the southwest shore of Owens Lake. Cartago was the shipping port for the ore produced by the Cerro Gordo Mines. A steam-powered barge, the Bessie Brady, was launched in 1872, which cut the three-day freight journey around the lake down to three hours.

At first, the barge transported charcoal from Cartago to the smelters at the northeastern port of Swansea. On the return trip, it carried silver and lead ingots from the smelters across Owens Lake to Cartago. From there, the ingots were loaded onto twenty-mule team wagons and transported to Los Angeles. The docks at Swansea were no longer functional after the 1872 Owens Valley earthquake, so the town of Keeler replaced Swansea as the smelting location and center of trade for the Cerro Gordo mines. Keeler had a population of 5,000 in the late 1870s.

The Cottonwood charcoal kilns were built to transform wood from trees in Cottonwood Canyon above the lake into charcoal to feed the smelters across the lake at Swansea. The ruins of these kilns are located on the western side of the lake bed, just north of Cartago. Identified as California Historical Landmark #537, they were similar to the nearby Wildrose charcoal kilns in Death Valley.

The trying three-week (one way) journey improved after the formation of the Cerro Gordo Freighting Company, run by ancestors of regional historian Remi Nadeau who has written of this period.

=== Other enterprises ===
Silver mining ended at Cerro Gordo in 1879, but Keeler was saved when the Carson and Colorado Railway built a narrow-gauge railway track to the town. The rail line was sold to Southern Pacific Railroad in 1900. Keeler was a soda, salt, and marble shipping center until 1960.

In the 20th century, the Clark Chemical Company operated on the northwestern shore at Bartlett, with evaporation ponds for lake brine and a plant to extract its chemicals.

Mineral extraction plants around the lake include:

- Inyo Development Company, 1887–1920
- Natural Soda Products Company/Michigan Alkali Company/Wyandotte Chemical Corporation, 1912–1953
- California Alkali Company/Inyo Chemical Company, 1917–1932
- Pacific Alkali/Columbia-Southern Chemical Corporation/Pittsburgh Plate Glass, 1928–1968
- Permanente Metals Corporation, 1947–1950
- Morrison and Weatherly Chemical Corporation (M&W)/Lake Minerals Corporation (LMC)/Cominco American Inc./Owens Lake Soda Ash Company (OLSAC)/Rio Tinto Borax, 1962–present. Rio Tinto Borax has mineral lease renewals through 2048.

== In popular culture ==
Owens Lake and the nearby Alabama Hills has long been a popular place for location shooting of Hollywood films. Some examples include Westward Ho (1935), Riders of the Dawn (1937), Across the Plains (1939), Saboteur (1942), Stage to Tucson (1951), From Hell to Texas (1958), Nevada Smith (1966), Maverick (1994), Top Gun (1986) and Tremors (1990).

== See also ==
- California Historical Landmarks in Inyo County
- List of drying lakes
- List of lakes of California
