= Owens River course =

Owens River
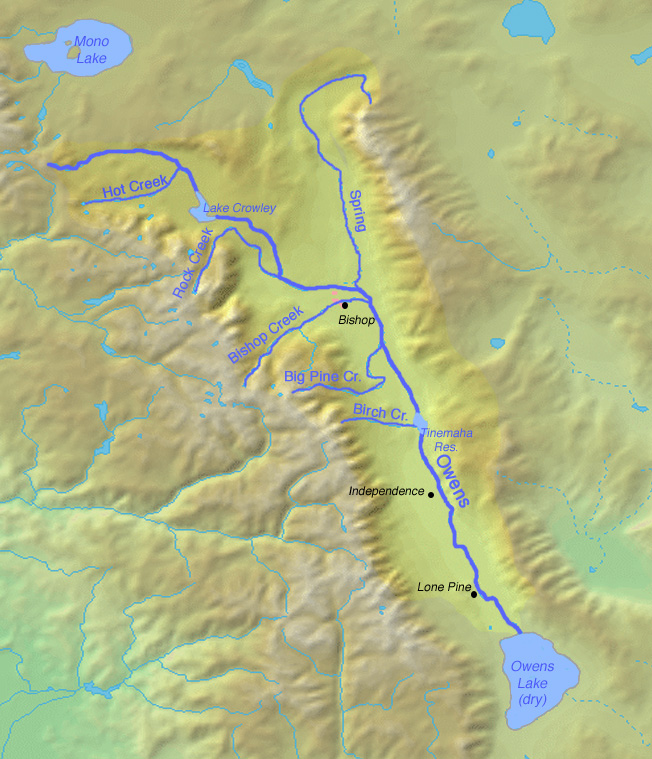
- The Owens River course begins (top left) as Deadman Creek, and the river designation begins where the Big Springs tributary enters the Deadman Creek channel.

Location
- Country: United States
- State: California

Physical characteristics
- Length: 120 mi (190 km), north-south

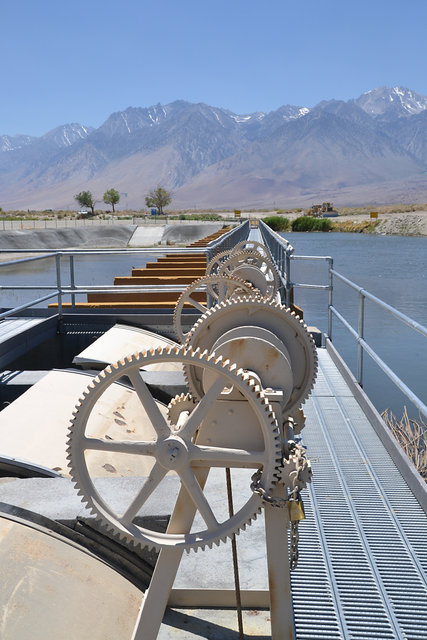
Diversion gates that control inflow to the Lower Owens River

The Owens River course includes headwaters points near the Upper San Joaquin Watershed, reservoirs and diversion points (e.g., for the Los Angeles Aqueduct), and the river's mouth at Owens Lake. The river drains the Crowley Lake Watershed (USGS HUC 18090102) of 1,900 sq mi (4,900 km^{2}) and the north portion of the Owens Lake Watershed (USGS HUC 18090103) of 1,340 sq mi (3,500 km^{2}).

Owens River course
wikiarticle for point	description of point	elevation & coordinates
Sierra Crest	headwaters (San Joaquin Mountain summit)	11,555 ft (3,522 m)
Deadman Creek	watercourse originates (perennial flow east of summit)	10,794 ft (3,290 m)
Sierra Escarpment	watercourse exits the Sierra Nevada	
Glass Creek	confluence	
lower montane forest	exits upper montane forest into pinyon/juniper-dominated area	9,000 ft (2,700 m)
Big Springs	confluence (river designation)	7,248 ft (2,209 m)
Long Valley	enters valley	
Basin & Range ecoregion	enters bitterbrush/sagebrush-dominated area	7,000 ft (2,100 m)
Long Valley Caldera	enters volcanic region of Walker Lane	
Long Valley Caldera	stream gauge prior to tunnel 76 cu ft/s (2.2 m^{3}/s), 350/150 spring/winter	
Long Valley Caldera	-16 cu ft/s (0.45 m^{3}/s) outflow into Mono Craters tunnel (1941-1989 inflow)	...
Long Valley Caldera	exits Inyo National Forest	
Long Valley Caldera	exits Inaja Ranch	...
Long Valley Caldera	confluence, Hot Creek	
Long Valley Caldera	Benton Crossing	...
Crowley Lake	enters reservoir	...
Crowley Lake	confluence, Convict Creek (west side)	
Crowley Lake	confluence, Hilton Creek (south side)	
Crowley Lake	inflow of water diverted from Rock Creek^{:12}	
Crowley Lake	confluence, Whiskey Creek (south)	
Crowley Lake	confluence, Crooked Creek (south)	
Crowley Lake	-16 cu ft/s (0.45 m^{3}/s) diversion (hydroelectric pipeline to Pleasant V Reservoir)	
Crowley Lake	Long Valley Dam (exits caldera & 380 sq mi (980 km^{2}) Long Hydrologic Unit)	6,783 ft (2,067 m)
Owens River Gorge	stream gauge at main weir (downstream of dam)	
Owens River Gorge	re-enters Inyo National Forest	
Owens River Gorge	exits Mono County, enters Inyo County	
Owens River Gorge	exits Inyo National Forest	
Owens River Gorge	confluence, Lower Rock Creek	
Owens River Gorge	enters Pleasant Valley Reservoir	
Owens River Gorge	reservoir dam (Middle Owens River begins)	
Owens River Gorge	enters valley at exit of gorge	
Round Valley	enters valley at exit of gorge	
Horton Creek	confluence	
Owens Valley	exits Round Valley, enters Owens Valley	
Spring Valley Wash	confluence	
McNally canals	diversion for irrigation	
Fish Slough	confluence	
US 6	bridge	
Laws Ditch	inflow north of Bishop, California	
Bishop Creek	confluence	
Big Pine canal	diversion	
Fish Springs canal	diversion	
A-drain	inflow	
Big Pine Creek	confluence	3,916 ft (1,194 m)
Tinemaha Reservoir	gauge station at inflow	
Tinemaha Reservoir	confluence, Tinemaha Creek (west side)	
Tinemaha Reservoir	outlet at dam	
Owens Lake Watershed	exits Crowley Lake Watershed	
LA Aqueduct	325-foot (99 m) diversion weir (Lower Owens River begins)	
SR 136	stream gauge & pumpback station at Keeler Bridge	
Owens Lake	mouth	3,556 ft (1,084 m)

External images
- Long Valley Dam site
- Hilton Creek fault
