= Deadman Creek =

Deadman Creek may refer to:

- Deadman Creek (Owens River), a stream in California
- Deadman Creek (Snake River), a stream in the U.S. state of Washington
