= Morgan Creek (California) =

- Location of the mouth of Morgan Creek in California

Location
- Country: United States
- State: California
- Counties: Mono, Inyo
- Municipality: Inyo National Forest

Physical characteristics
- Source: Sierra Crest
  - coordinates: 37.391232°N 118.751092°W
- Mouth
  - location: Pine Creek
  - coordinates: 37.36047°N 118.697405°W

Basin features
- River system: NW Owens Valley

Morgan Creek is a 4.1-mile-long (6.6 km) stream in Mono and Inyo counties of eastern California, in the western United States.

It flows from the high eastern Sierra Nevada in the Inyo National Forest, through Round Valley, to its confluence with Pine Creek near the Owens River northeast of Bishop in the Owens Valley.

== Course ==
Morgan Creek flows from Sierra Crest headwaters, through Upper Morgan Lake and Lower Morgan Lake, with a right tributary draining Bear Creek Spire through Spire Lake and Split Lake. A left tributary is from the Mount Morgan cirque, the Finch Lake cirque, and two other cirques on the south.

The Morgan Creek mouth is the confluence with Pine Creek, northeast of the Pine Creek—Rock Creek and Rock Creek—Owens River confluences.

== See also ==
- Owens River course
- Mount Tom (California)
