= California Volcano Observatory =

Research center in California, United States

Coordinates: 37°27′23″N 122°10′17″W

United States Geological Survey California Volcano Observatory
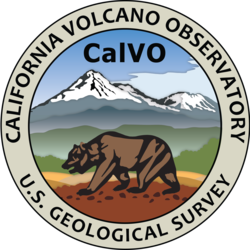

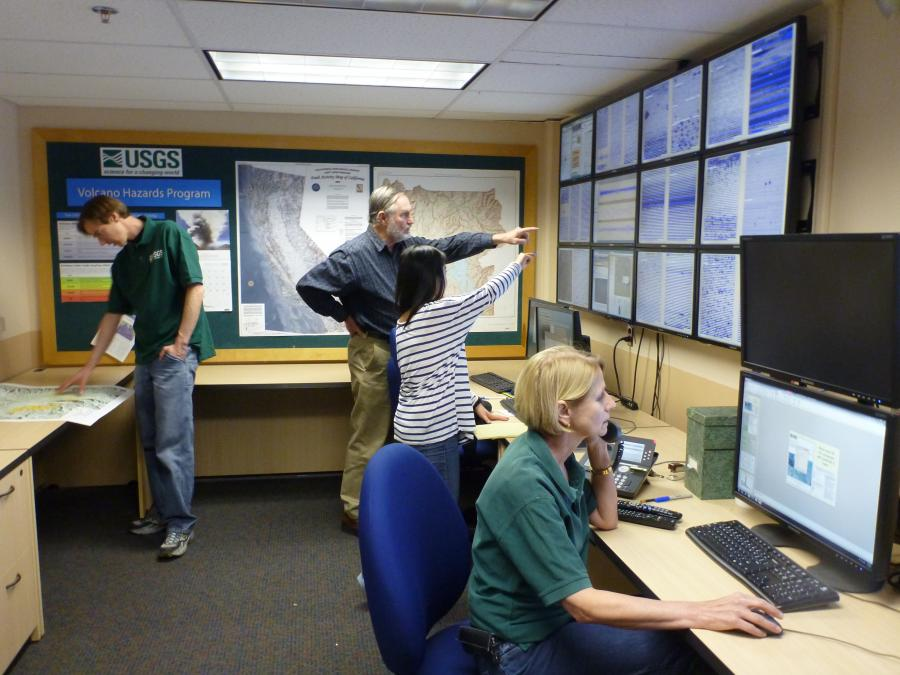
- The CalVO operations room in Menlo Park

Agency overview
- Formed: 2012
- Headquarters: Menlo Park, California, USA
- Agency executive: Dr. Andrew Calvert, Scientist-in-Charge (USGS)
- Website: https://www.usgs.gov/observatories/calvo

The California Volcano Observatory (CalVO) is the volcano observatory that monitors the volcanic and geologic activity of California and Nevada. It is a part of the Volcano Hazards Program of the United States Geological Survey, a scientific agency of the United States government.

Originally, the volcano observatory was known as the Long Valley Observatory which monitored volcanic activity east of the Sierra Nevada in Mono County, California which included Long Valley Caldera, Mammoth Mountain, and the Mono–Inyo Craters.

In 2012, the Long Valley Observatory was integrated into the new California Volcano Observatory based in Menlo Park, California which covers the entire states of California and Nevada, this includes the southern Cascade Range volcanoes in the state of California which were previously under the jurisdiction of the Cascades Volcano Observatory.

== Monitored volcanoes ==
These are the volcanoes monitored by the California Volcano Observatory, in order of highest to lowest risk assessment.

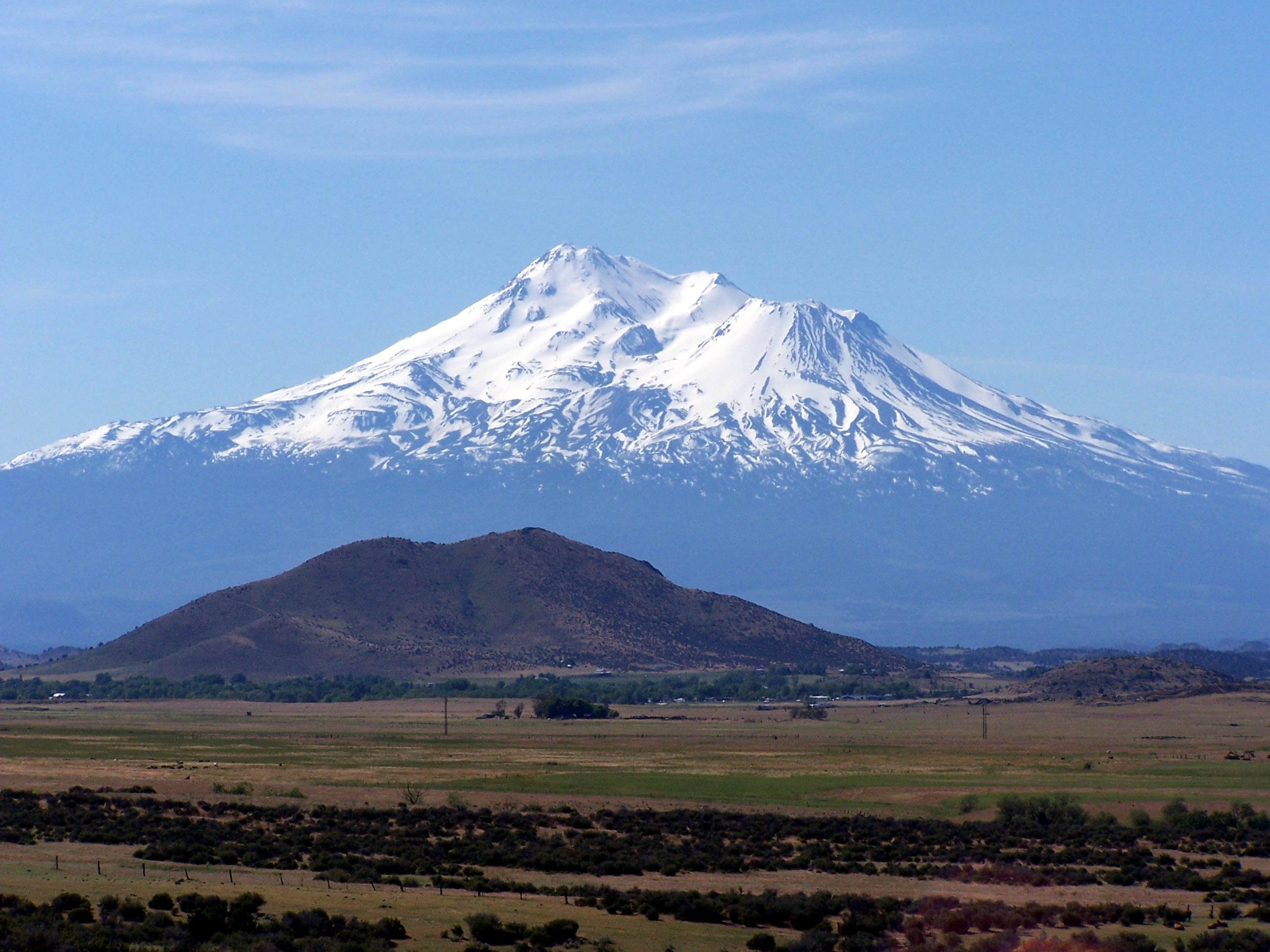
Mt Shasta

According to USGS risk assessment of the volcanoes in CalVO's region, the following volcanoes were ranked "very high threat potential".

- Mount Shasta in far-northern California, north of Redding
- Lassen Volcanic Center in Lassen Volcanic National Park
- Long Valley Caldera in eastern California

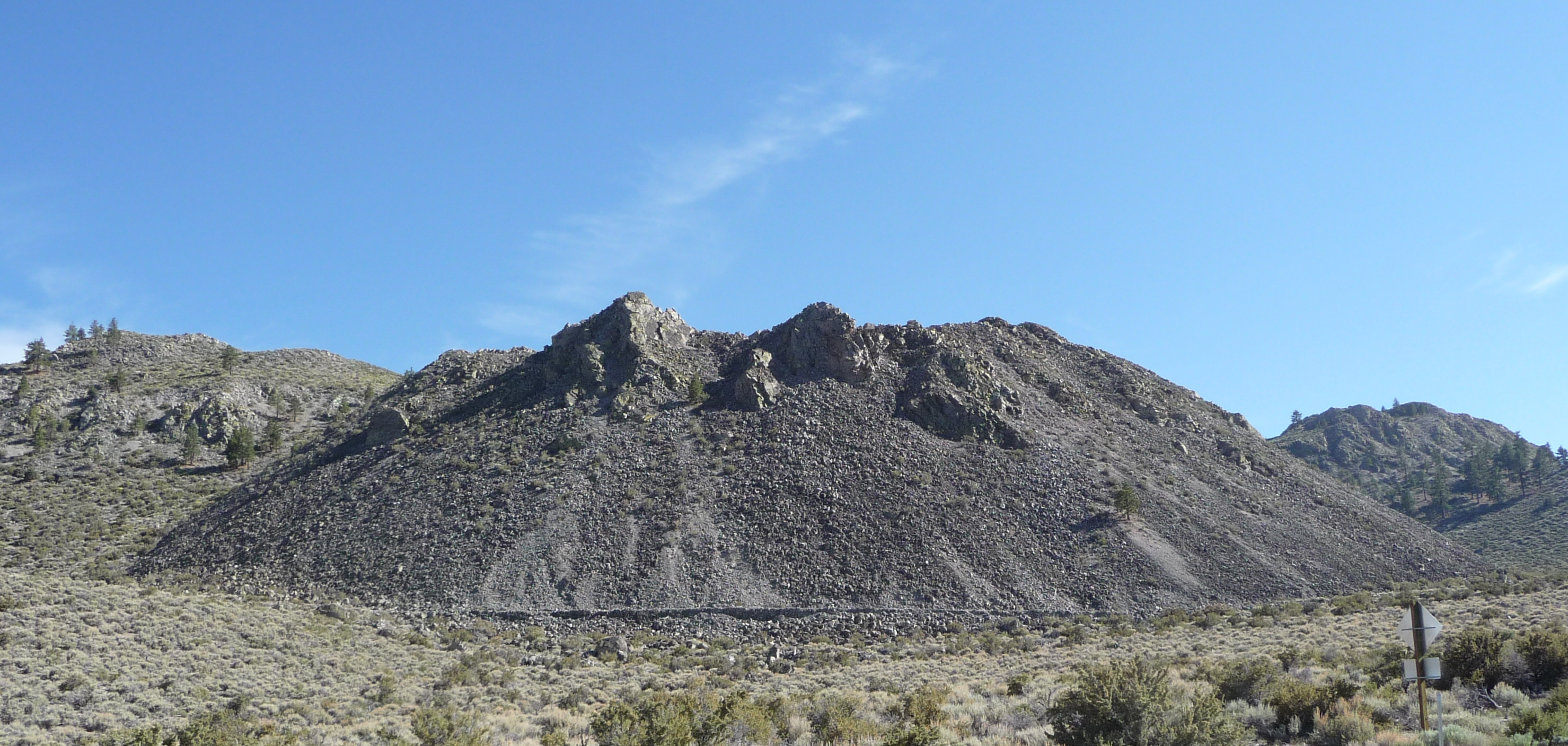
Mono-Inyo Craters

These were ranked "high threat potential":

- Mono-Inyo Craters in eastern California
- Clear Lake Volcanic Field north of the San Francisco Bay Area
- Medicine Lake Volcano in far-northern California, northeast of Mt Shasta
- Salton Buttes in far-southern California, at the Salton Sea

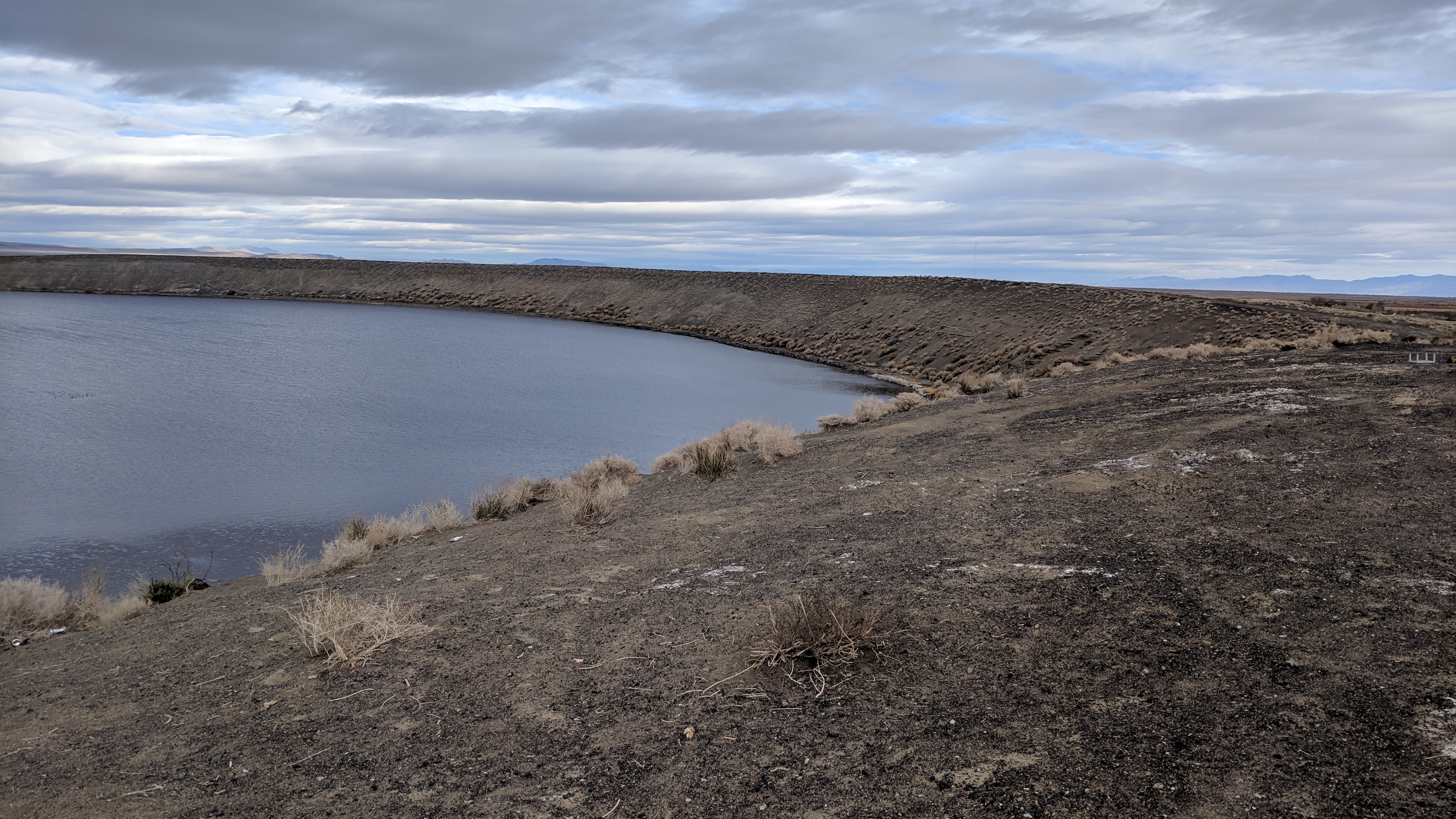
Soda Lakes

These were ranked "moderate threat potential":

- Mono Lake Volcanic Field in eastern California
- Coso Volcanic Field in eastern California
- Soda Lakes in northwestern Nevada near Fallon
- Mammoth Mountain in eastern California
- Ubehebe Craters in Death Valley National Park

One was ranked "Low to Very Low Threat Potential":

- Golden Trout Creek volcanic field in Sequoia National Forest.

Other volcanoes in the region have not been assessed at one of these risk levels that warrant monitoring. Volcanoes which have not erupted during the Holocene were not included. USGS noted that though less probable it is still possible for volcanoes to erupt on longer intervals than that.

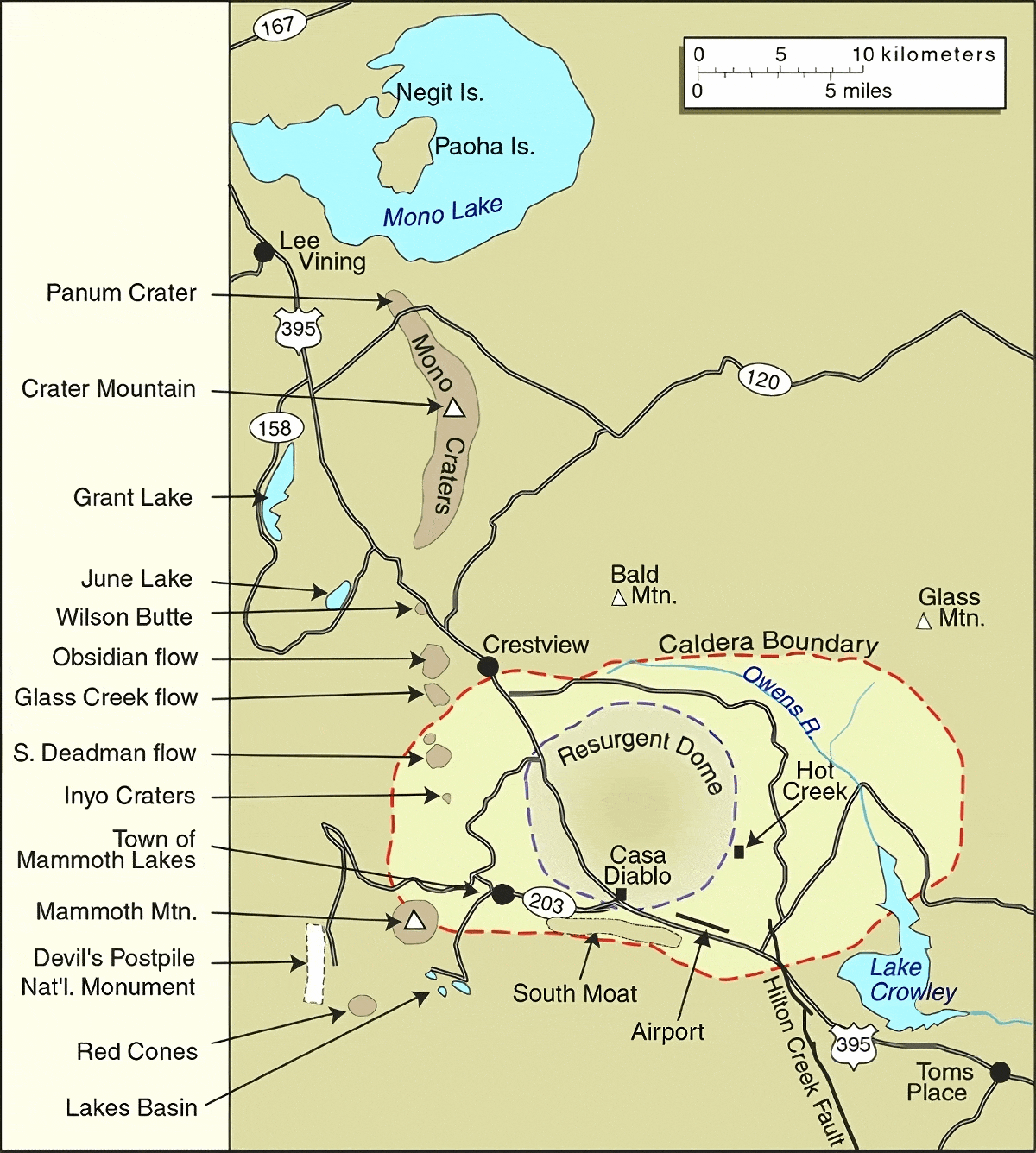
USGS map of the Mono Basin area, showing the Long Valley Caldera (click on to see detail).

== See also ==
- Bishop Tuff
- Hot Creek (Mono County, California)
