= Rock Creek (Owens River tributary) =

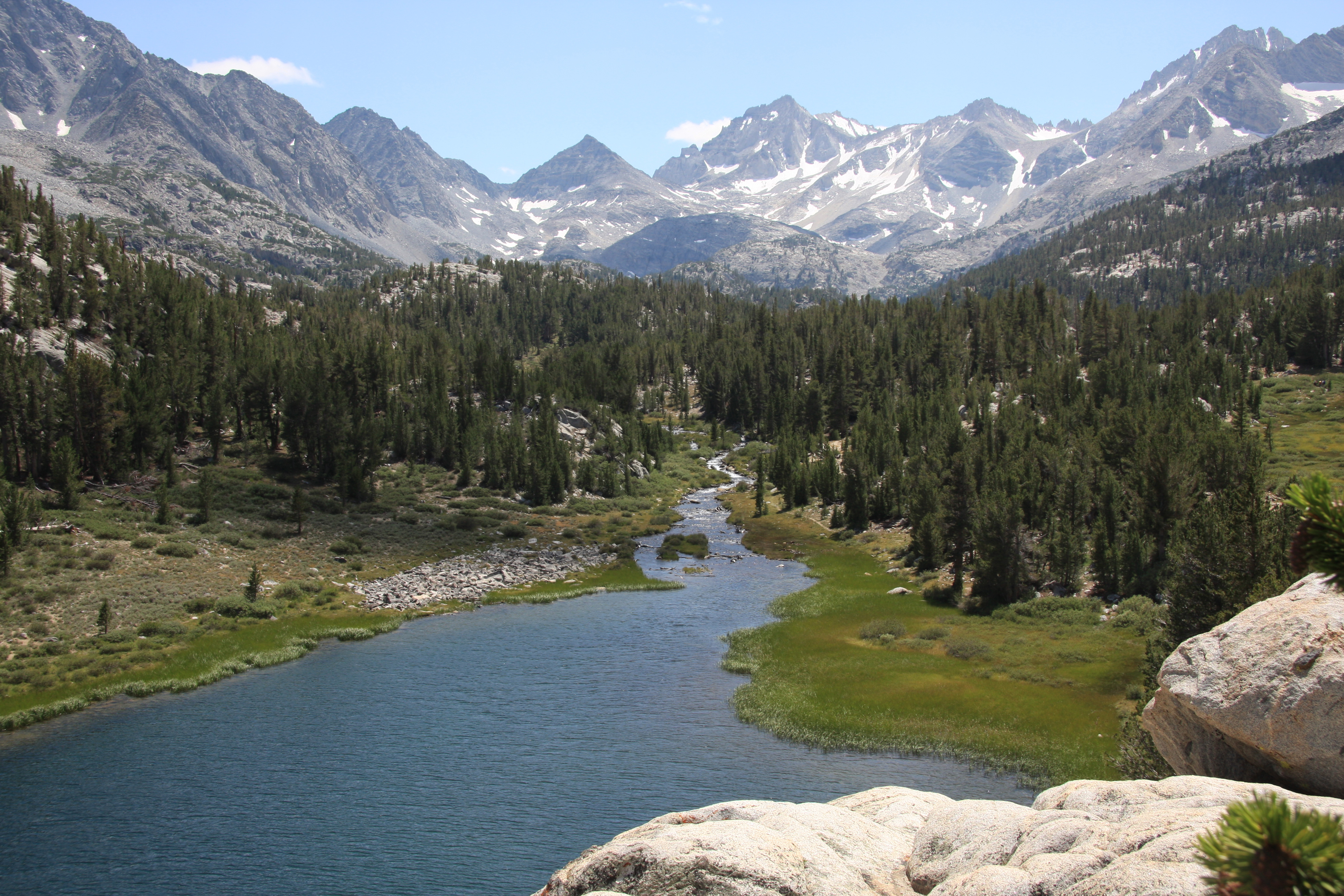
- Rock Creek with the Sierra Crest in the background

- Location of the mouth of Rock Creek in California

Location
- Country: United States
- State: California
- Region: Mono County
- District: Inyo National Forest

Physical characteristics
- Source: Rock Creek Lake
  - location: John Muir Wilderness, Inyo National Forest
  - coordinates: 37.4554886°N 118.7356796°W
- Mouth: Owens River
  - location: Owens River Gorge
  - coordinates: 37.5610431°N 118.6801252°W
- Length: 30 mi (48 km)Rock Creek plus Lower Rock Creek

Basin features
- River system: Long Valley—Crowley Lake Watershed
- Tributaries
  - right: Witcher & Pine Creeks

Rock Creek is a stream that flows from the high Eastern Sierra Nevada to the Owens River in Mono County of eastern California. The upper watershed is in the John Muir Wilderness of the Sierra and Inyo National Forests.

== Course ==
Rock Creek drains from the Sierra Crest near Bear Creek Spire. Additional creek drainage is from the crest's Mount Abbot, Mount Mills, Ruby Peak, and Mount Starr. They combine with flow from Little Lakes Valley to Rock Creek Lake.

From the lake Rock Creek flows northeast to the location known as Tom's Place along U.S. Route 395, less than two miles from the Owens River. The creek, however, turns southeast and flows parallel to the Owens River (and is shown on maps as "Lower Rock Creek"), eventually joining the river near the mouth of the Owens River Gorge.

Upstream from Tom's Place, Rock Creek is 15.9 miles (25.6 km) long. Lower Rock Creek, below Tom's Place, flows an additional 14.1 miles (22.7 km) to the Owens River.

== See also ==
- Bishop Creek (Inyo County)
- Morgan Creek
- List of California rivers
