= Hot Creek =

Hot Creek could refer to one of the following places:

== United States ==
- Hot Creek (Mono County)
- Hot Creek (Modoc County)
- Hot Creek Range
- Hot Creek (Siskiyou County)
