= Bishop Tuff =

Volcanic tuff in the western United States

Bishop eruption
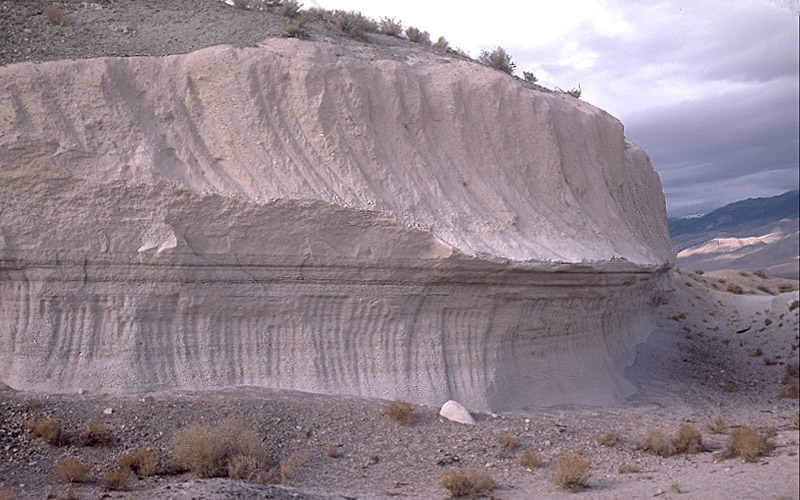
- Two layers of the Bishop Tuff: lower layer was from ashfall, upper layer was from the main pyroclastic flow.
- Volcano: Long Valley Caldera
- Date: 764,800 ± 600 years ago
- Type: Ultra-Plinian
- Location: California, United States; 37°43′00″N 118°53′03″W
- Volume: Approx. 200 km^{3} (48 mi^{3})
- VEI: 7

Maps
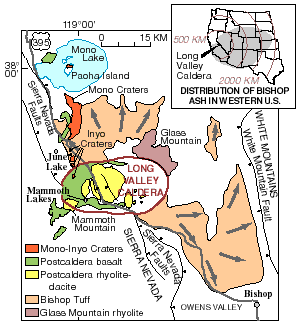
- Map of the Long Valley Caldera, with Bishop Tuff outlined.

The Bishop Tuff is a welded tuff which formed 764,800 ± 600 years ago as a rhyolitic pyroclastic flow during the approximately six-day eruption that formed the Long Valley Caldera. Large outcrops of the tuff are located in Inyo and Mono Counties, California, United States. Approximately 200 cubic kilometers of ash and tuff erupted outside the caldera.

== Modern exposure ==
The Bishop Tuff caps a volcanic plateau in the northern Owens Valley in eastern California. The tableland formation is located east of U.S. Route 395 and west of the Nevada stateline, sitting northwest of Bishop and southeast of Crowley Lake and Mammoth Lakes. Another part of the flow is south of Mono Lake, and surrounding the Mono-Inyo Craters.

Deposits of Bishop Tuff in this area cover nearly 2,200 km^{2} (850 mi^{2}), and are as thick as 200 m (660 ft).

The Owens River cuts through the Volcanic Tableland, an ignimbrite plateau which is a principal sector of the Bishop Tuff outflow sheet. Erosion of the plateau by the Owens River has carved the Owens River Gorge.

== Lithology ==
The Bishop Tuff is a high-silicate rhyolitic welded tuff, made up of ash and pumice clasts. The main minerals found in the pumice clasts are biotite, plagioclase, quartz, and sanidine. The main composition is SiO_{2} (73.4-77.9%), followed by Al_{2}O_{3} (12.7%).

The Bishop Tuff is compositionally zoned. The lower section, formed from ash fall, is notated by pyroxene-free high-silica rhyolite pumice. The upper section, formed by pyroclastic flow, is notated by pyroxene-bearing high-silica rhyolite pumice. The magma that formed the Bishop Tuff is suggested to be a "residual magma derived from some parental magma and not itself a primary or parental partial melt of common crustal rocks".

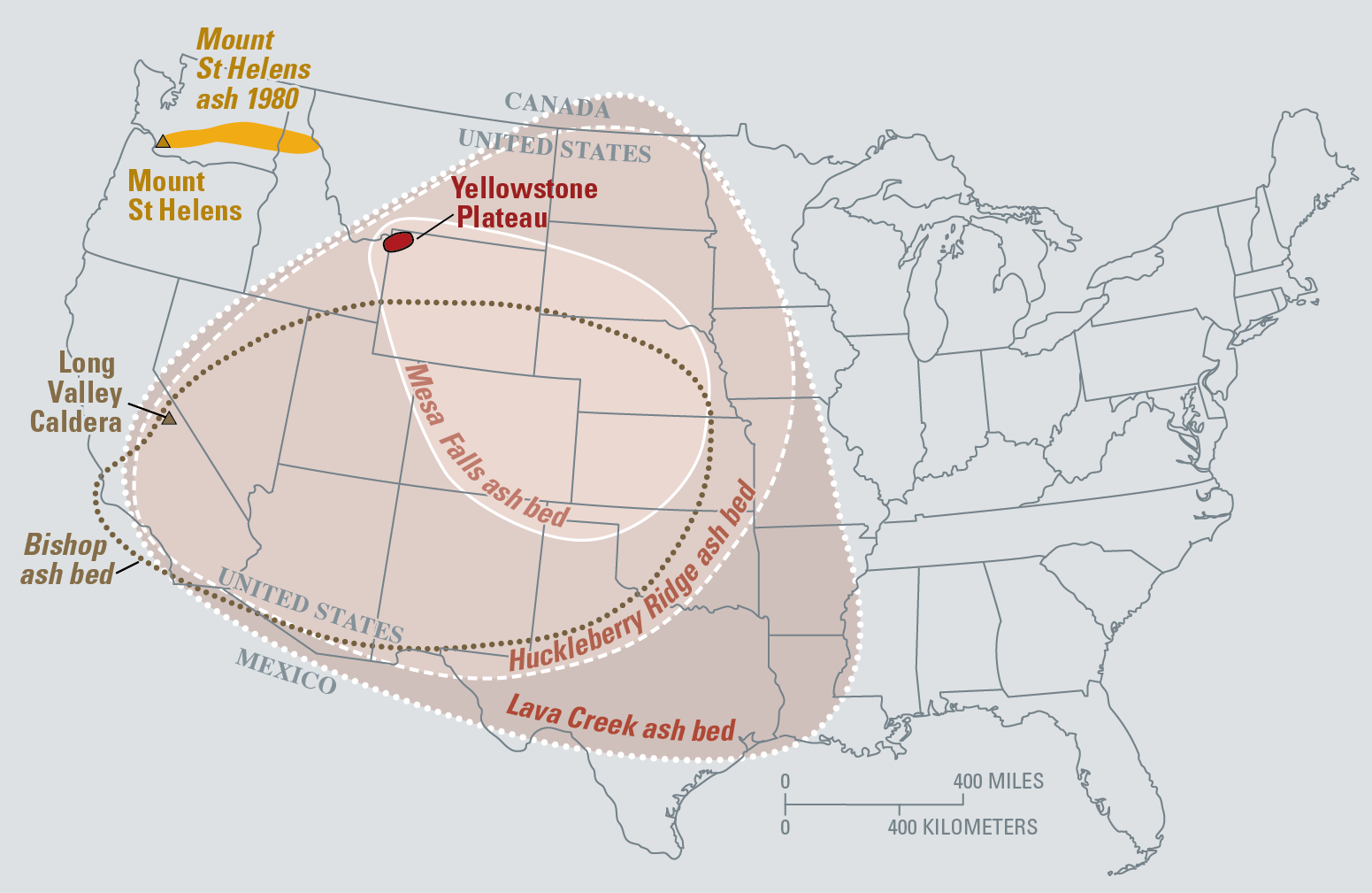
Map of the known extent of ashfalls for Quaternary eruptions in Southwest US. By Volcano Hazards Program

== See also ==
- Glass Mountain
