= Glass Mountain (California) =

Mountain in California, United States

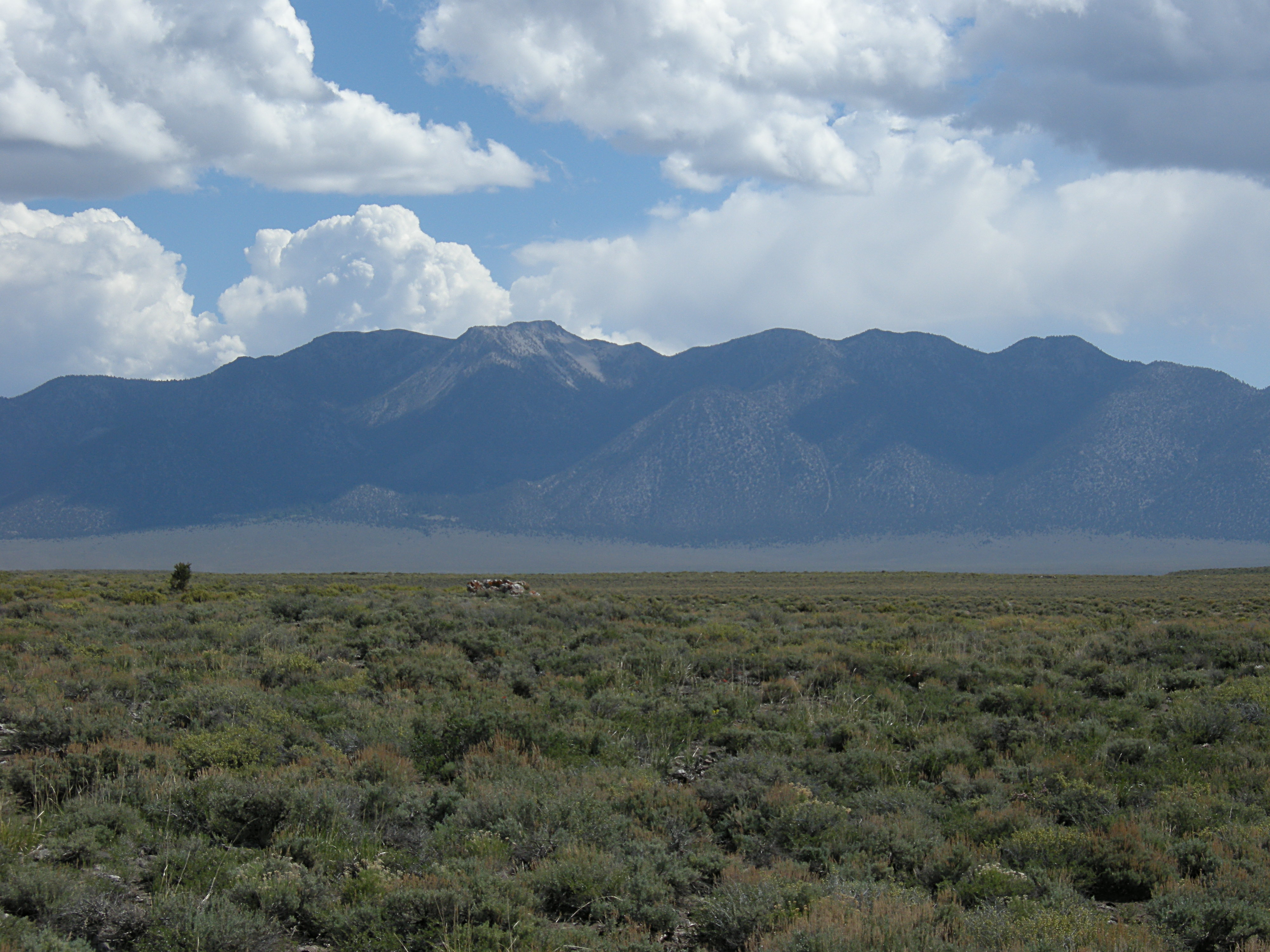

Highest point
- Elevation: 11,128 ft (3,392 m) NAVD 88
- Prominence: 3,180 ft (969 m)
- Coordinates: 37°46′30″N 118°42′31″W

Geography
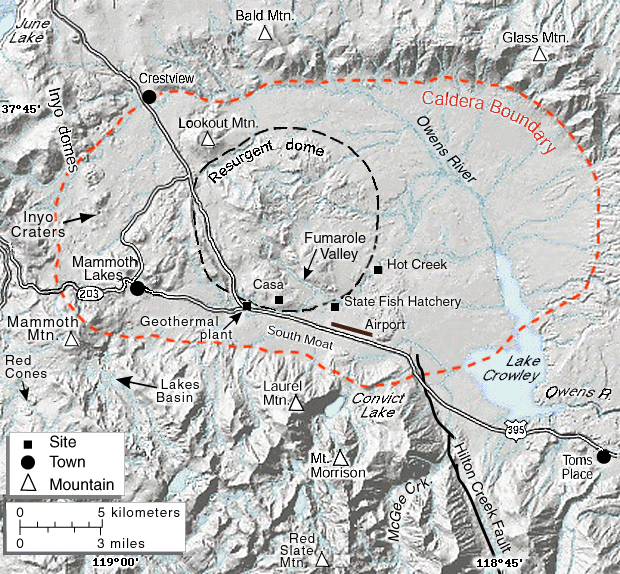
- Glass Mountain in relation to the Long Valley Caldera
- Location: Mono County, California, U.S.
- Parent range: Glass Mountain Range
- Topo map: USGS Glass Mountain

Glass Mountain, in Inyo National Forest, is a peak in Mono County, California. The peak lies 20 miles (32 km) southeast of the shoreline of Mono Lake and is the highest point on the four-mile (6.4 km) long sinuous Glass Mountain Ridge.

The Glass Mountain Ridge forms the northeast boundary of Long Valley Caldera. It consists of a sequence of lava domes, flows, and welded pyroclastic flows of rhyolite composition that were erupted between 2.1 and 0.8 million years ago. Obsidian, a naturally occurring volcanic glass, can be found on the mountain.

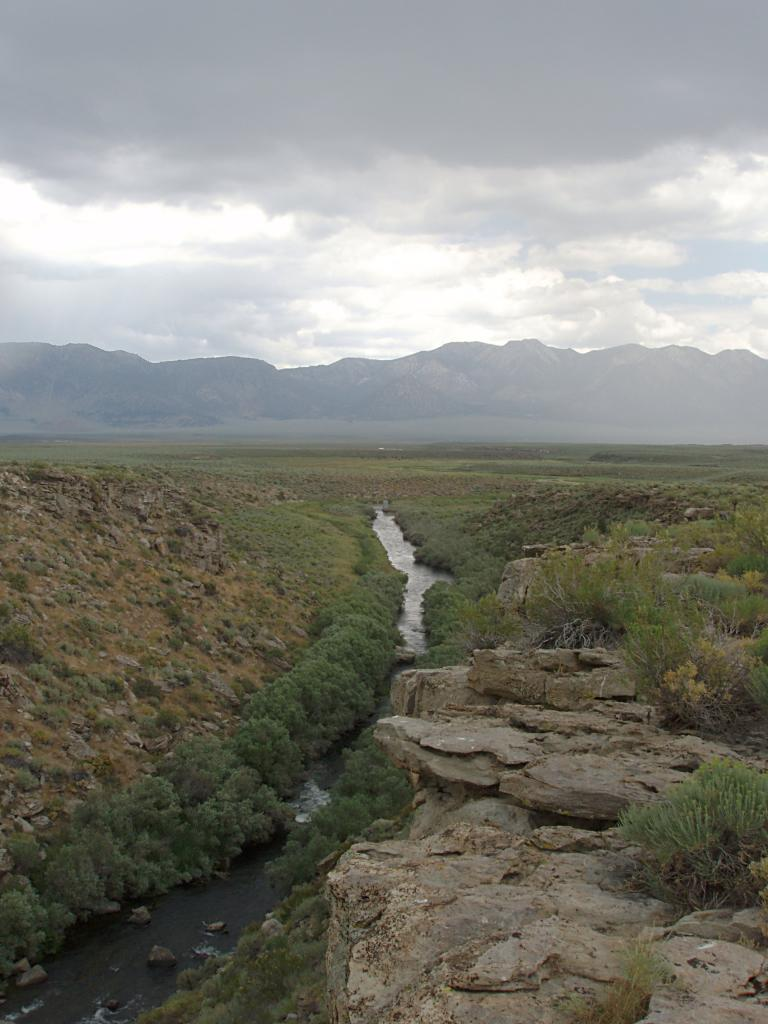
Hot Creek with the Glass Mountains in the distance
