= Twin Lakes (Mammoth Lakes, California) =

Lake in the state of California, United States

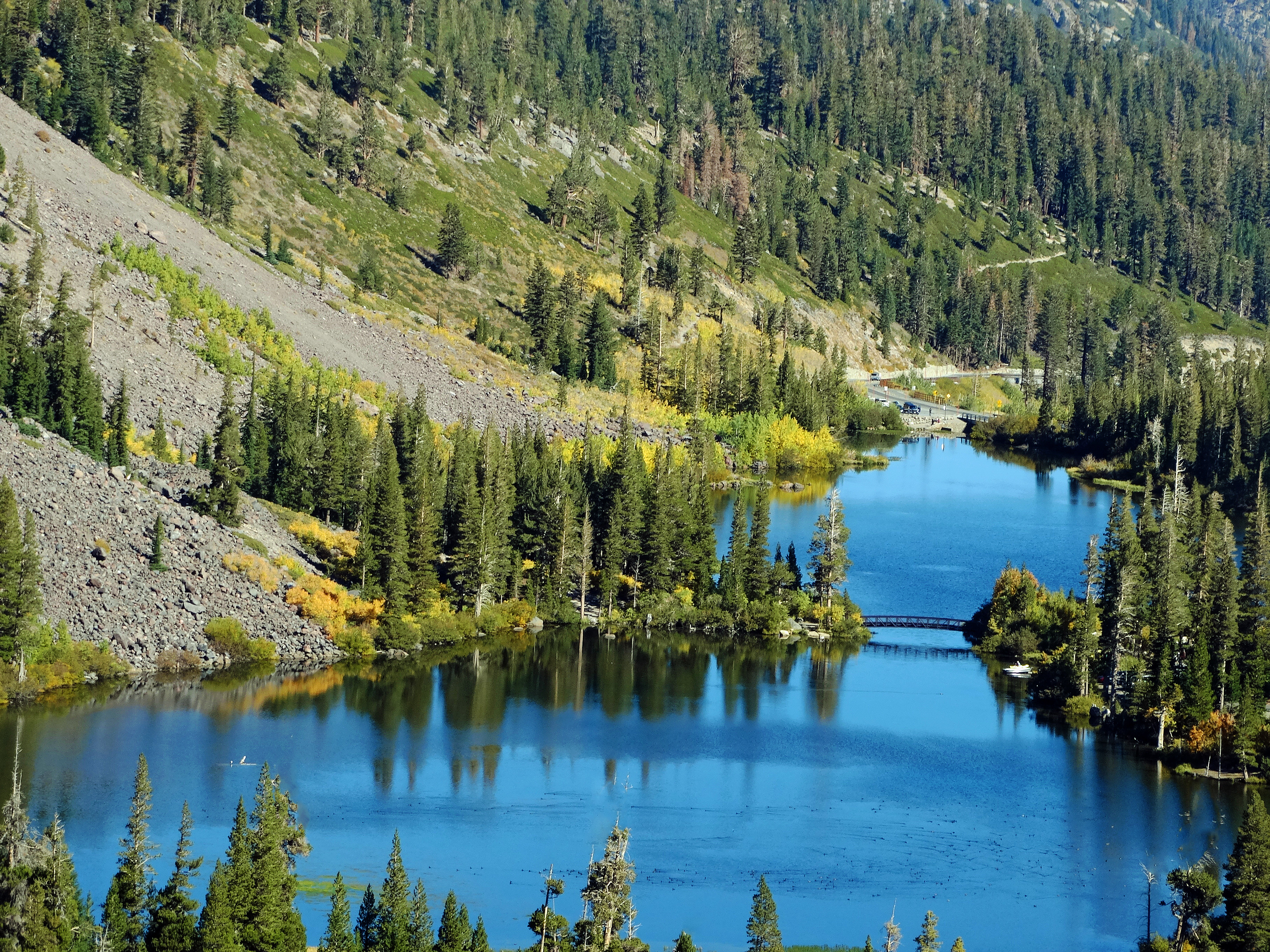
- Twin Lakes as seen from above Twin Falls

- Location within California Location within the United States
- Location: Mono County, California, United States
- Coordinates: 37°37′05″N 119°00′28″W
- Primary inflows: Twin Falls
- Primary outflows: Mammoth Creek
- Surface elevation: 8,563 feet (2,610 m)
- Settlements: Mammoth Lakes, California

Twin Lakes is a set of connected lakes at the base of the southeastern slope of Mammoth Mountain, in Mono County of eastern California. They are in the eastern Sierra Nevada, and within the Inyo National Forest.

Twin Lakes are the lowest lakes in the Mammoth Lakes Basin. On one side of the lake are lava cliffs that were formed by eruptions of Mammoth Mountain. The other side of the lake has the Inyo National Forest's Twin Lakes Campground, and Tamarack Lodge of the Mammoth Mountain Ski Area.

== See also ==
- Twin Lakes (Bridgeport, California) – another pair of lakes in Mono County by the same name
- List of lakes in California
