= Chrysopolis, California =

Chrysopolis
- Former settlement
- Location in California
- Coordinates: 36°57′38″N 118°11′48″W
- Country: United States
- State: California
- County: Inyo
- Elevation: 3,819 ft (1,164 m)

Chrysopolis (Greek for 'city of gold') is a former settlement in Inyo County, California, United States. It was located on the east bank of the Owens River, south of Aberdeen, at an elevation of 3,819 feet (1,164 m).

== Geography ==
The town was founded in 1863, making it one of the earliest settlements in the Owens Valley. It was situated in the east of the valley, making it one of the more arid places in the valley. As the name of the town suggests, Chrysopolis had an industry based on gold mining.

== History ==
=== Original town ===
Ever since the town was founded, Chrysopolis made its industry and economy based on mining. The area prospered briefly, but the population quickly declined because of both troubles with natives living in the region and its geographic isolation. These troubles were eventually resolved with the construction of a nearby fort, but by the time of its completion, more people were interested in the west side of the Owens Valley and left Chrysopolis behind. Although the town was abandoned, mining persisted in the region.

=== Mining boom and Chrysopolis ===
The town was revived in the 1900s, when a boom in mining swept through the region. During this boom, more people got focused on the old Chrysopolis mining area. The event was short-lived, however. It had reached its end by 1910, and again people packed up and left.

=== Ruins ===
Most of the town is gone, but there are still several stone walls and structures and some mining tunnels.
