= Deadman Creek (Owens River tributary) =

- Location of the mouth of Deadman Creek in California

Location
- Country: United States
- State: California
- District: Mono County, California

Physical characteristics
- Source: San Joaquin Mountain
  - coordinates: 37.719914°N 119.09935°W
- Mouth: Owens River
  - location: creek & Big Springs confluence
  - coordinates: 37°45′01″N 118°56′20″W

Basin features
- River system: Crowley Lake Watershed

National Wild and Scenic Rivers System
- Designated: March 30, 2009

Deadman Creek is the main creek that becomes the Owens River where Big Springs enters the Deadman Creek channel, "two miles east of the CalTrans US395 Crestview maintenance station," near Deadman Summit. The Sierra Crest demarcates the creek's drainage from the drainage of the Middle Fork San Joaquin River on the west.

== See also ==
- List of rivers of California
