= Hot Creek (Mono County) =

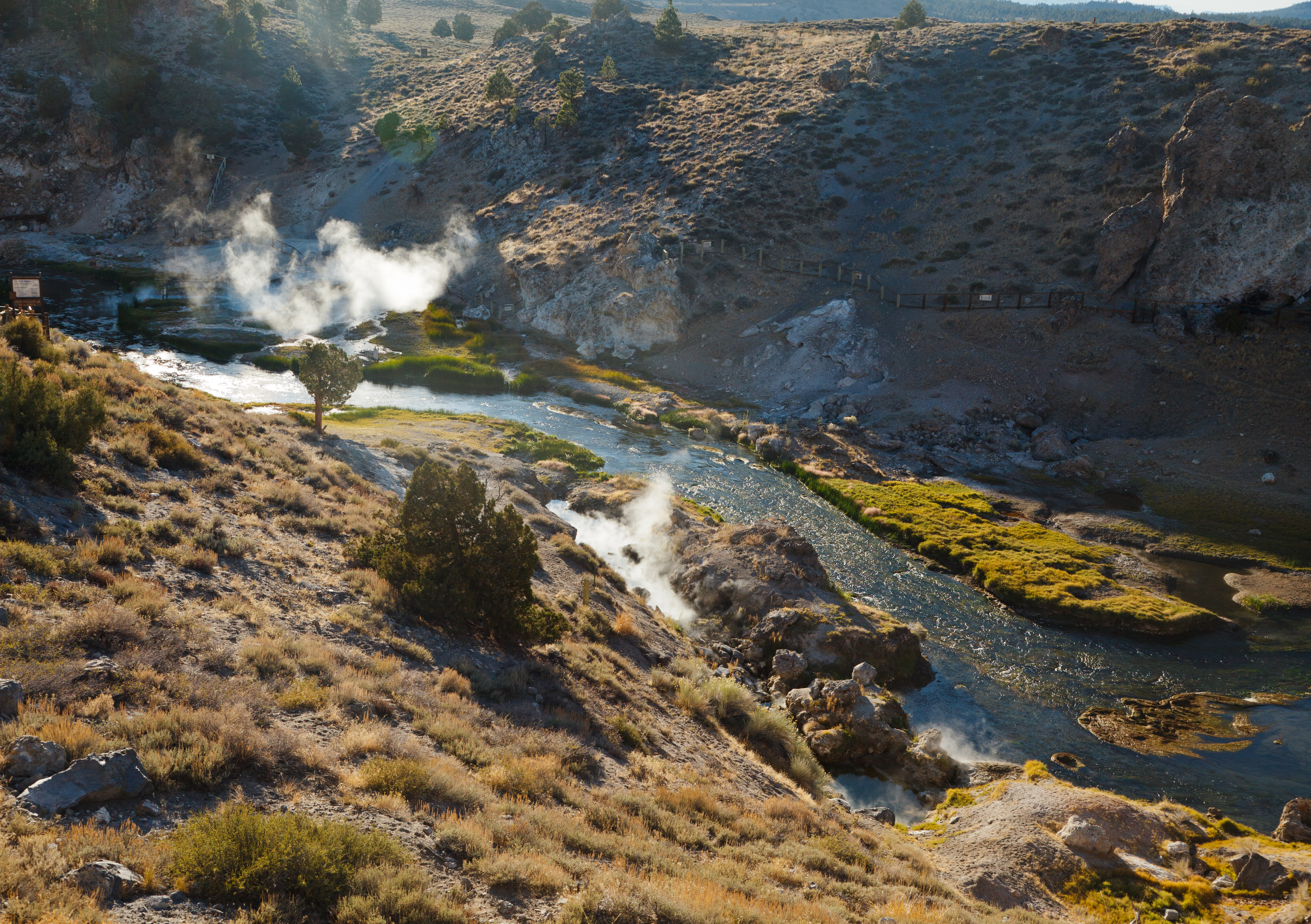
- Steam from geothermal springs rise above Hot Creek

Location
- Country: United States
- State: California
- County: Mono

Physical characteristics
- Source
  - location: Twin Lakes
  - coordinates: 37°37′05″N 119°00′28″W
  - elevation: 8,563 ft (2,610 m)
- Mouth
  - location: Owens River
  - coordinates: 37°42′30″N 118°47′01″W
  - elevation: 6,844 ft (2,086 m)

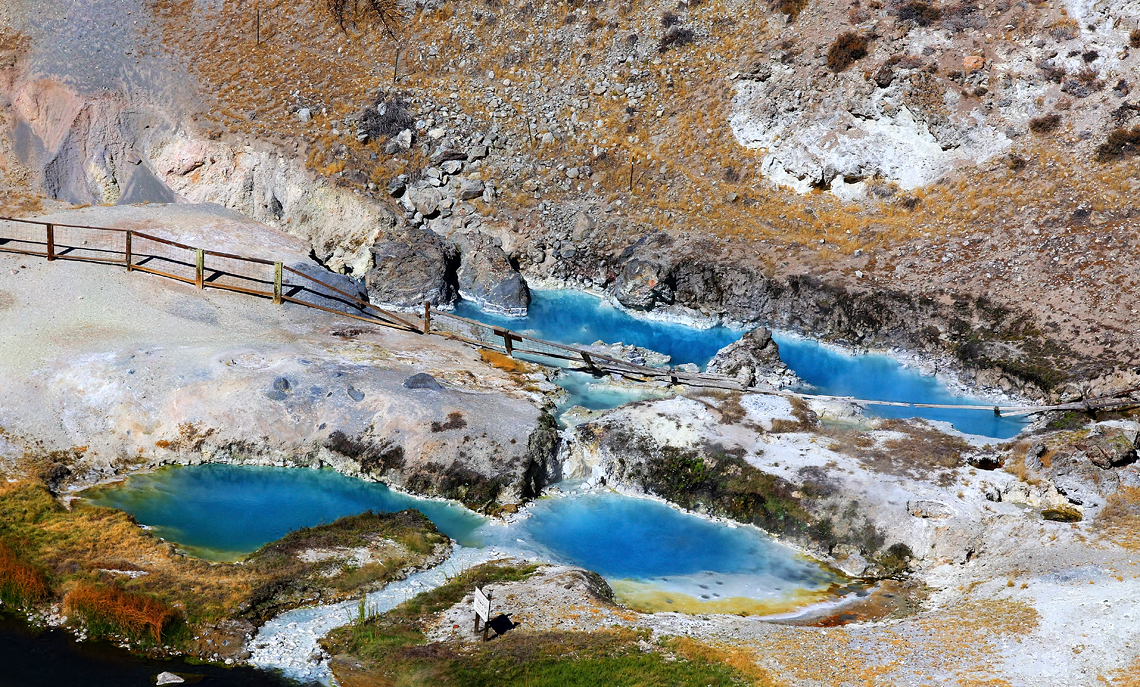
The Hot Creek Pools

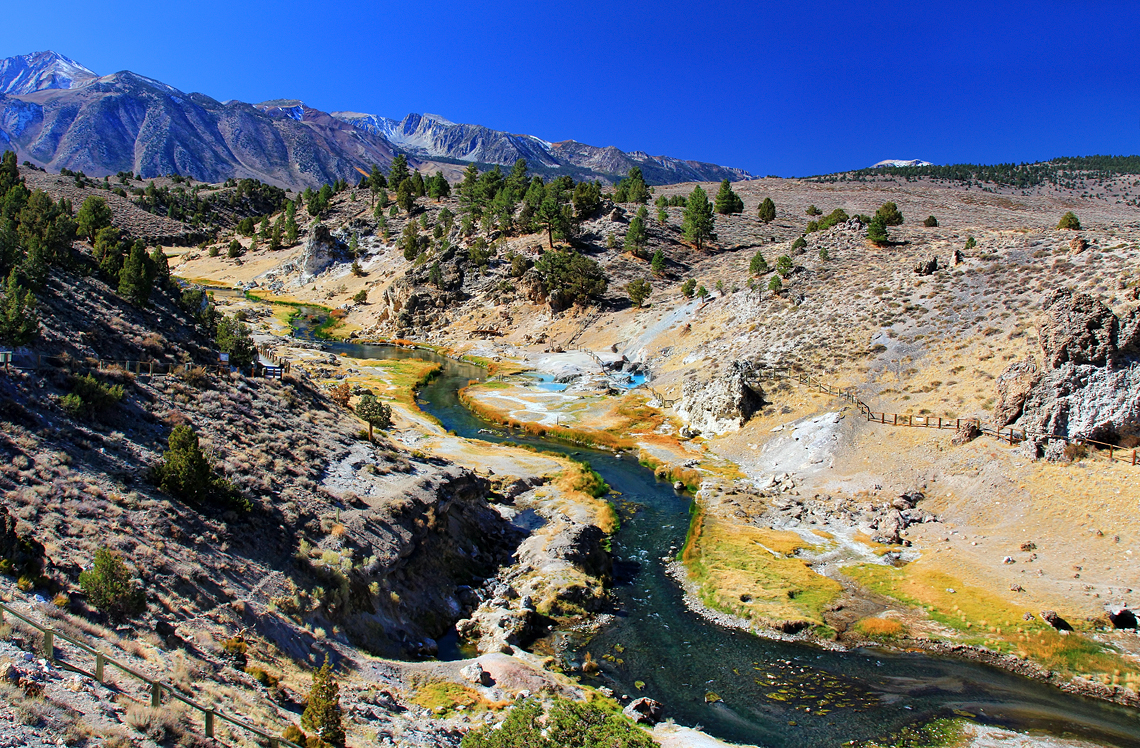
Hot Creek Panorama in the Summer

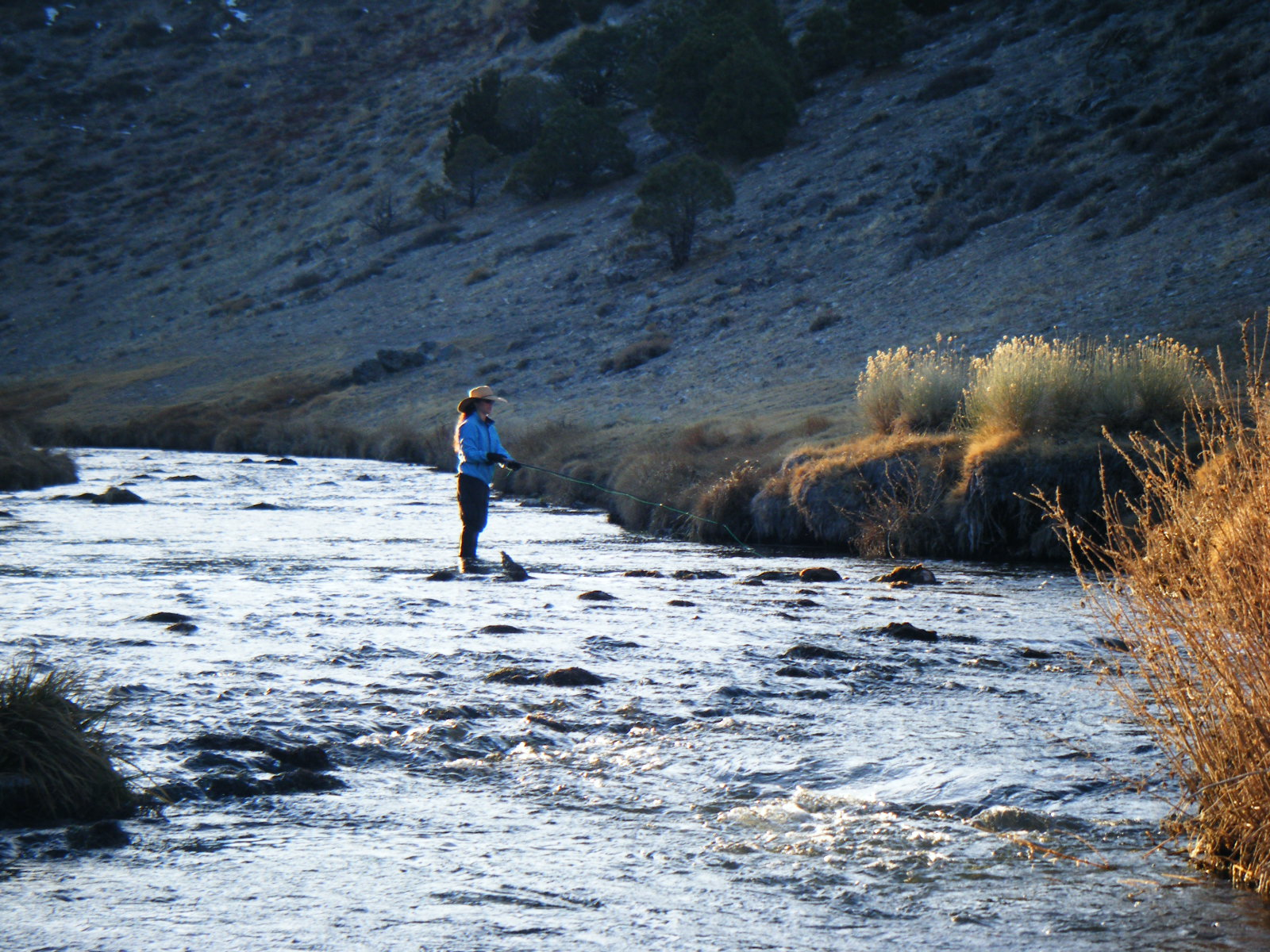
Hot Creek: fly fishing in the stream.

Hot Creek, starting as Mammoth Creek, is a stream in Mono County of eastern California, in the Western United States. It is within the Inyo National Forest.

== Course ==
=== Mammoth Creek ===
The creek begins its course in the eastern Sierra Nevada named as Mammoth Creek. It originates as an outflow of Twin Lakes, just south of Mammoth Mountain and above the town of Mammoth Lakes. The stream is primarily sourced from melted snow water at 8,500 feet (2,600 m) above sea level. It is quite cold, rarely being above 50 °F (10 °C).

=== Hot Creek ===
As Mammoth Creek leaves the Sierra and flows east into the Long Valley Caldera it is joined by warmer water from geothermal springs at the Hot Creek State Fish Hatchery. From this confluence the stream is named Hot Creek, though its water temperature seldom exceeds 68 °F (20 °C) until it reaches Hot Creek Gorge, 8 miles (13 km) east of Mammoth Lakes. In the Hot Creek Gorge, numerous hot springs near and in the stream bed add hot water into the stream. Its mouth is at the confluence with the Owens River upstream from Crowley Lake.

== Ecology ==
The springs near Hot Creek host one of the two known Tui chub populations of the endangered Owens tui chub species.

The Long Valley Observatory of the United States Geological Survey (USGS), a volcano observatory, monitors spring activity, water temperatures and chemistry, and stream flow, as well as the caldera volcanic activity.

== Hot Creek hydrothermal system ==
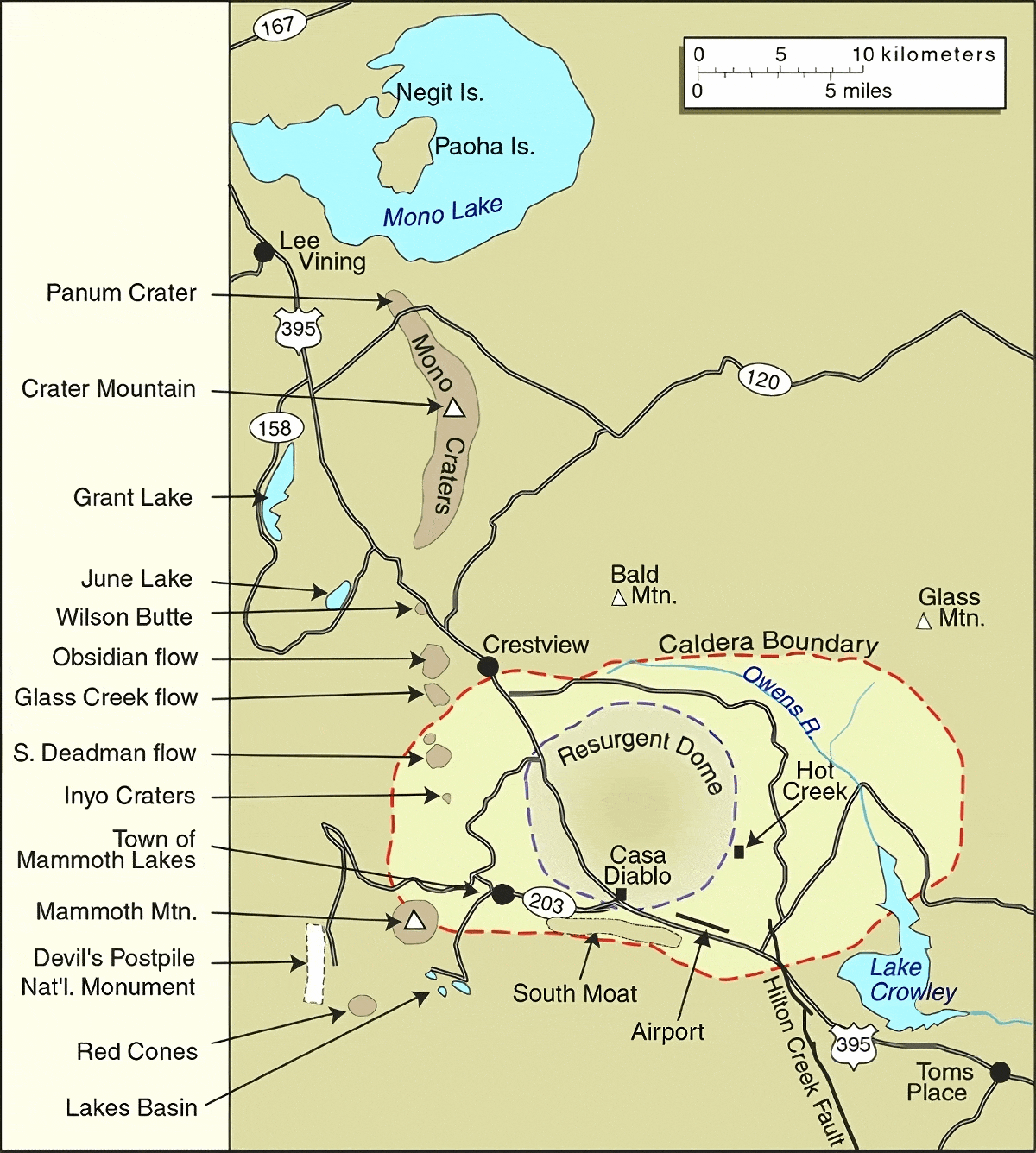
USGS map of the Mono Basin area, showing the Long Valley Caldera (click to see detail).

In hydrothermal systems, the circulation of ground water is driven by a combination of topography and geothermal heat sources. The system in the Long Valley Caldera is recharged primarily from snowmelt in the highlands around the western and southern rims of the caldera. The meltwater infiltrates to depths of a few kilometers (or miles), where some is heated to at least 430 °F (220 °C) by hot rock near the Inyo craters. The heated water, kept from boiling by high pressure, still has lower density than cold water, and it rises along steeply inclined fractures to depths of 0.3–1.25 miles (0.48–2.01 km). It then flows eastward through rock layers to hydrothermal vent discharge points at the surface along Hot Creek and around Crowley Lake. The water temperature declines eastward because of heat loss and mixing with cold water, and in the springs near Crowley Lake temperatures are at only about 125 °F (50 °C).

The springs in Hot Creek all emerge along a stream section between two faults and discharge a total of about 8.5 cubic feet per second (240 liters per second) of hot water. This water flow represents nearly 70 percent of the total heat discharged by all thermal springs in Long Valley Caldera. The thermal springs farther east all discharge less water and at lower temperatures.

The larger and more vigorous springs discharge from fractures in the volcanic rock in the gorge. Rock fracturing happens because the thermal area lies within a region of frequent earthquakes and active uplift of the ground. When fractures become sealed by mineral deposition, spring discharge and temperature decline. When new fractures develop or sealed fractures reopen, spring discharge and temperatures can increase suddenly.

== Access ==
The Hot Creek Gorge area of Hot Creek is managed by the U.S. Inyo National Forest as a geologic interpretive site and recreation area. It is popular for fishing, swimming, hiking, bird watching, and photography activities.

=== Dangers and recent activity ===
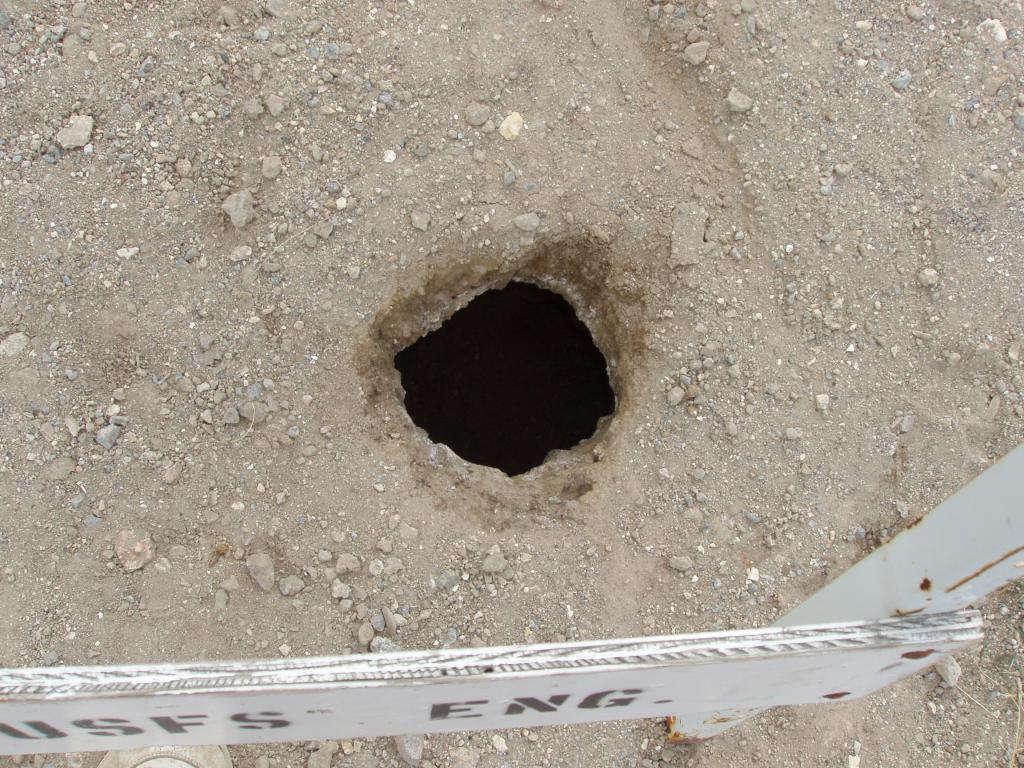
Fumarole—steam vent beside Hot Creek, in the Hot Creek Gorge.

Hot Creek in the Hot Creek Gorge section can harbor dangers as the locations, discharge rates, and temperatures of springs often change. The changes can be sudden and dangerous to unprepared visitors (especially if entering beyond walkways and fences).

Since May 2006, springs in and near the most popular swimming areas have been geysering or intermittently spurting very hot, sediment-laden water as high as 6 feet (2 m) above the stream surface. At times this geysering activity is vigorous enough to produce "popping" sounds audible from hundreds of feet away. The geysering usually lasts a few seconds and occurs at irregular intervals, with several minutes between eruptions. Fumaroles, or steam vents, are also located in the gorge. They can occur in the ground beyond the creek bed. The unpredictability of this hazardous spring activity led the U.S. Forest Service to close parts of the Hot Creek Gorge in June 2006, and the closure has remained in effect as of February 2016.

Hot Creek Gorge was a filming location in the 1969 film True Grit, as well as the 1960 film North to Alaska also starring John Wayne, the 1966 Steve McQueen film Nevada Smith, and the 1971 film Shoot Out with Gregory Peck, which also starred True Grit's Jeff Corey.

== See also ==
- Bishop Tuff
- Mono Basin National Scenic Area
