= Deadman Creek (Snake River tributary) =

Stream in Washington, U.S.

Coordinates: 46°37′23″N 117°48′16″W

Deadman Creek is a stream in the U.S. state of Washington. It is a tributary of Snake River.

Deadman Creek was named in the early 1860s for an incident when two miners died of exposure in the area.

== See also ==
- List of rivers of Washington
