= Tinemaha Reservoir =

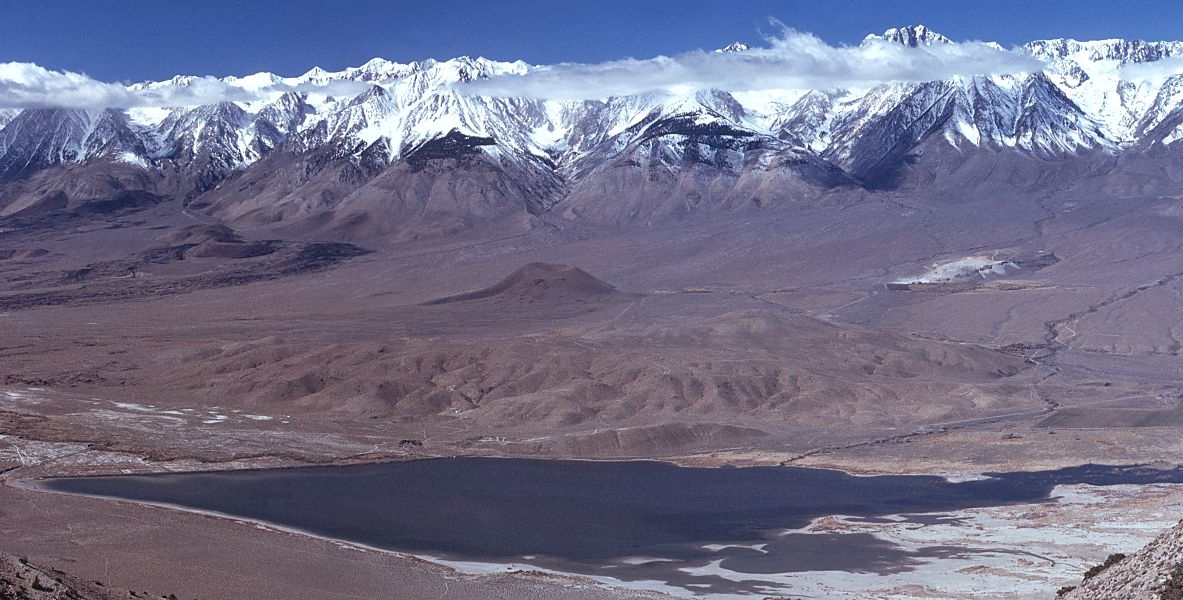

- Location within California Location within the United States
- Coordinates: 37°03′29″N 118°13′30″W
- Type: Reservoir
- Primary inflows: Owens River
- Built: 1962
- Water volume: 16,200 acre-feet (0.0200 km^{3})
- Surface elevation: 3,882 feet (1,183 m)

Tinemaha Reservoir is a reservoir created by a dam on the Owens River in the Owens Valley. It is located in Inyo County, eastern California.

It is part of the Los Angeles Aqueduct system, operated by the Los Angeles Department of Water and Power.

The 1938 western film Under Western Stars starring Roy Rogers was filmed here.

The reservoir is a hotspot for migratory birds, particularly waterfowl and shorebirds like loons and American white pelicans. Tundra swans can be found wintering at the reservoir.

== See also ==
- Owens River-related topics
- Los Angeles Aqueduct-related topics
- List of dams and reservoirs in California
