= Owens River Gorge =

Steep canyon on the upper Owens River in Eastern California

Coordinates: 37.574515°N 118.617325°W

Rock climbing in the Owens River Gorge.

The Owens River Gorge is a steep 10 mi (16 km) canyon on the upper Owens River in eastern California in the United States. The canyon is located at the eastern edge of the Sierra Nevada mountains in southern Mono County, along the stretch of the river where it exits the Long Valley near its source and enters the north end of Owens Valley. The gorge is a popular destination for rock climbing.

== Geology ==
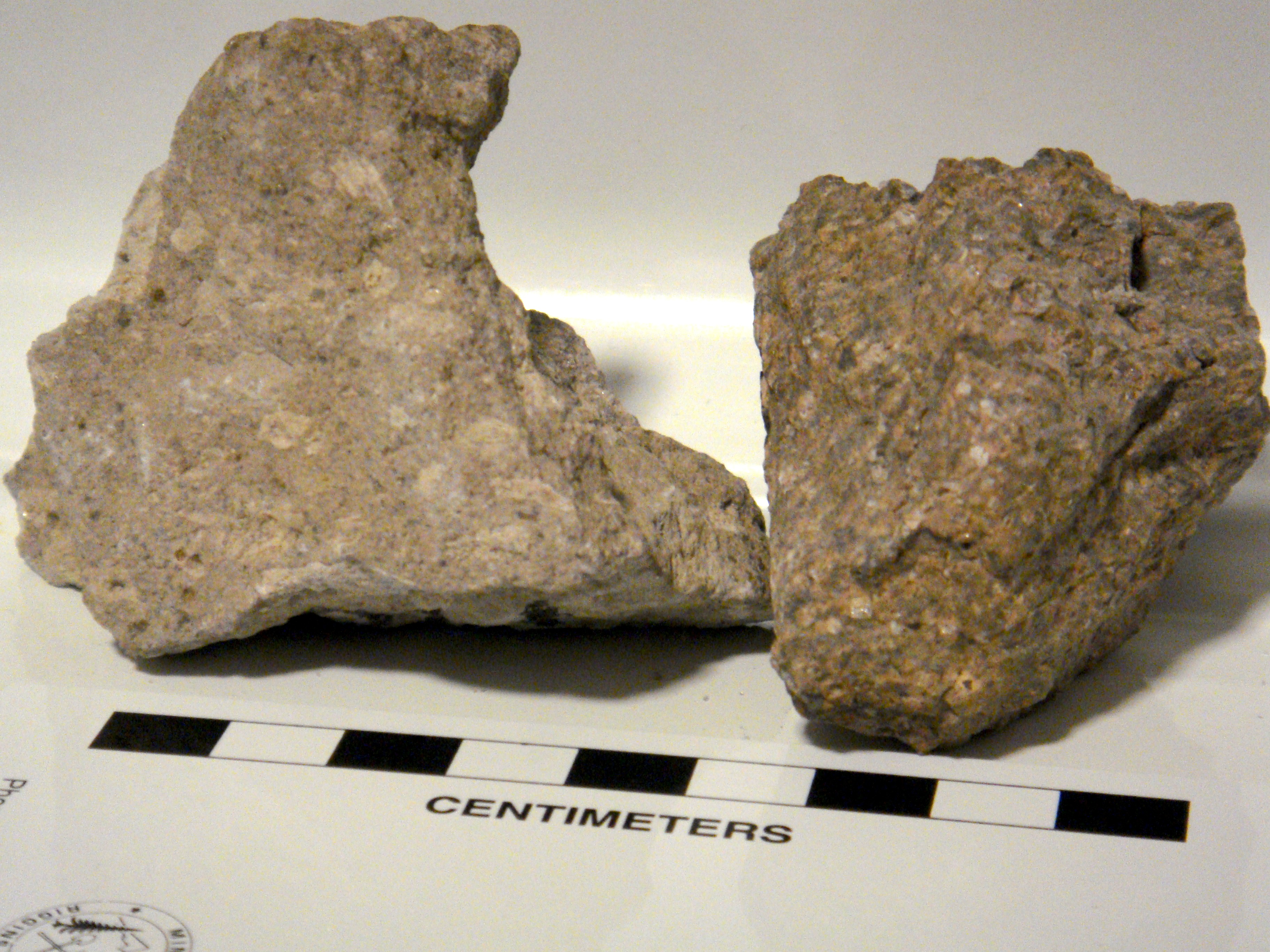
Rocks from the Bishop tuff, Owens River Gorge. Uncompressed with pumice on left; compressed with fiamme on right.

The Owens River Gorge was formed when the Owens River cut through the Bishop Tuff: a layer of welded ash formed from the eruption of the Long Valley Caldera. This erosion exposed the tuff layers, including rare columnar rhyolite formations.

== Water restoration ==
The Los Angeles Department of Water and Power constructed the Long Valley Dam at the head of the Owens River Gorge as part of a hydropower project in 1941, and completely dewatered the 16-km Lower Gorge reach from 1953 to 1991. Beginning in 1991, a limited range of flows has been released to rewater the reach, recreate riparian habitat, and reestablish a brown trout sport fishery while maintaining hydropower diversions.
