= Long Valley Caldera =

Landform near Mammoth Mountain, California, USA

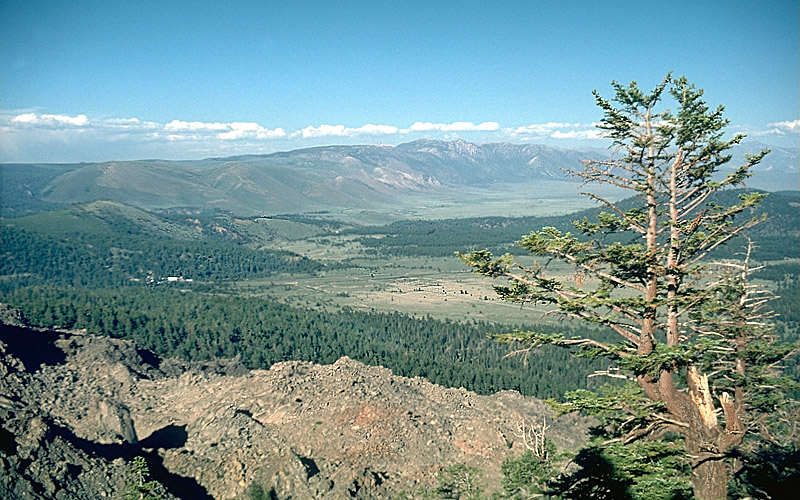
- View from northeast rim of caldera
- Floor elevation: 6,500–8,500 ft (2,000–2,600 m)
- Length: 20 mi (32 km) EW
- Width: 11 mi (18 km)
- Depth: up to 3,000 ft (900 m)

Geology
- Type: Caldera
- Age: 760,000 yrs

Geography
- Location: Mono County, California; United States
- Coordinates: 37°43′00″N 118°53′03″W
- Interactive map of Long Valley Caldera

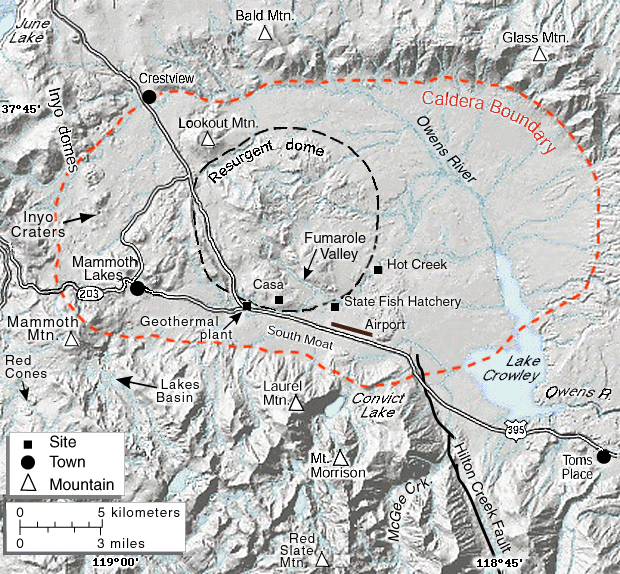
Map of Long Valley Caldera

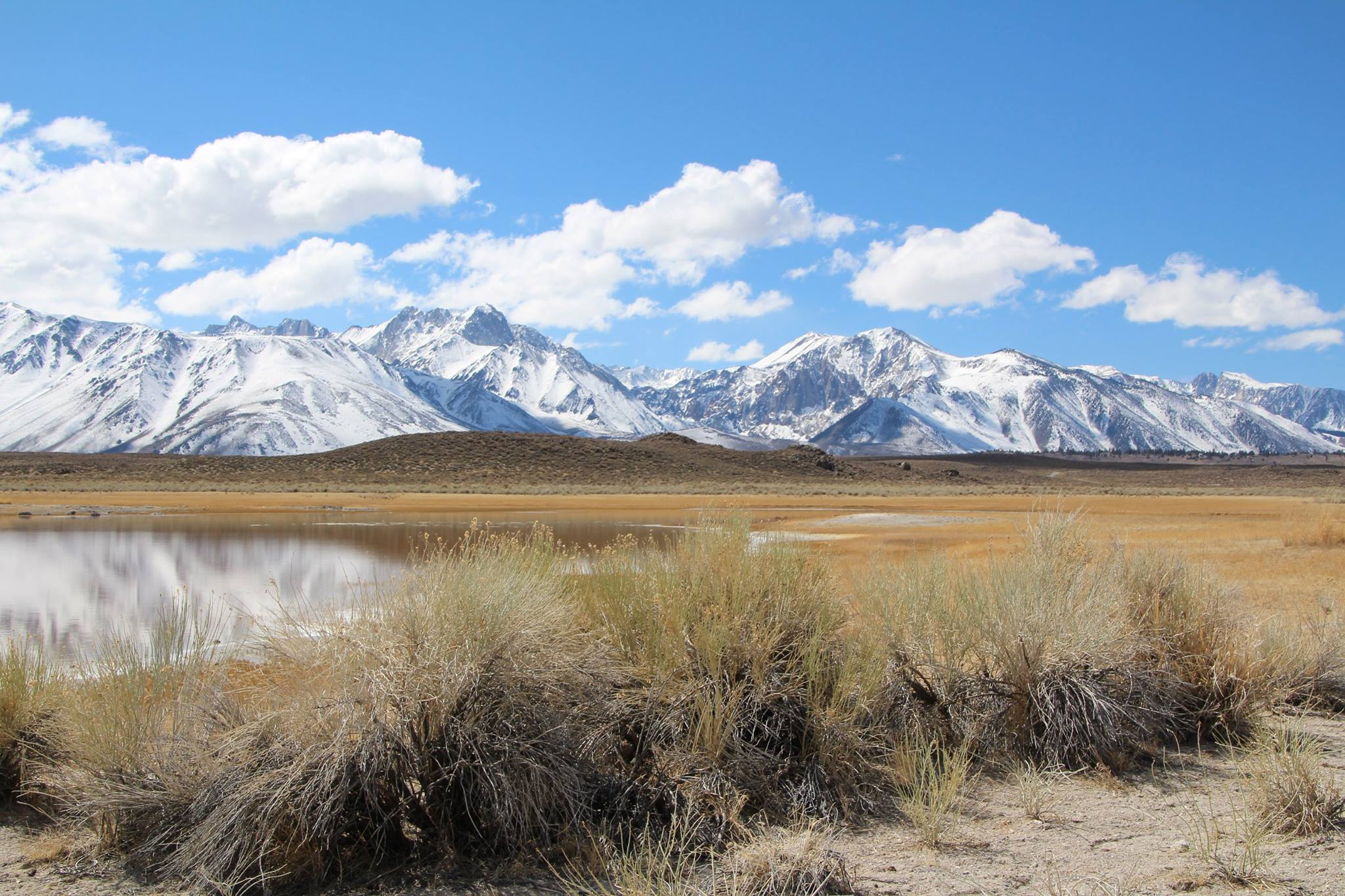
Early winter in Long Valley, 2017

Long Valley Caldera (Kato: Kwonteelhbiiʾ) is a volcanic caldera in eastern California that is adjacent to Mammoth Mountain. The valley is one of the Earth's largest calderas, measuring about 20 miles (32 km) long (east-west), 11 miles (18 km) wide (north-south), and up to 3,000 feet (910 m) deep.

The caldera was formed 760,000 years ago when a very large eruption released hot ash that later cooled to form the Bishop tuff that is common to the area. The eruption emptied the magma chamber under the area to the point of collapse. The second phase of the eruption released pyroclastic flows that burned and buried thousands of square miles. Ash from this eruption blanketed much of the western part of what is now the United States.

== Geography ==
The caldera is a giant bowl-shaped depression, approximately 20 miles (32 km) long, surrounded by mountains except to the southeast. The elevation of the bottom of the bowl ranges from 6,500 to 8,500 feet (2,000 to 2,600 m), being higher in the west.

Near the center of the bowl, magmatic uplift has formed a resurgent dome. The southeastern slope from the caldera down towards Bishop is filled with the Bishop Tuff, solidified ash that was ejected during the eruption that created the caldera. The Bishop tuff is 1,500 meters (4,900 ft) thick in the caldera floor, and is cut by the Owens River Gorge, formed during the Pleistocene when the caldera filled with water and overtopped its rim.

The rim of the caldera is formed from pre-existing rock, rising about 3,000 feet (910 m) above the caldera floor. However, the eastern rim is lower, only about 500 feet (150 m).

Mammoth Mountain is a lava dome complex west of the structural rim of the caldera, consisting of about 12 rhyodacite and dacite overlapping domes. These domes formed in a long series of eruptions from 110,000 to 57,000 years ago, building a volcano that reaches 11,059 feet (3,371 m) in elevation.

The Mono–Inyo Craters are a 25-mile-long (40 km) volcanic chain situated along a narrow, north–south-trending fissure system extending along the western rim of the caldera from Mammoth Mountain to the north shore of Mono Lake. The Mono-Inyo Craters erupted from 40,000 to 600 years ago, from a magma source separate from the Long Valley Caldera.

The caldera has an extensive hydrothermal system. Casa Diablo Hot Springs at the base of the resurgent dome hosts a geothermal power plant. Hot Creek cuts into part of the resurgent dome and passes through hot springs. The warm water of Hot Creek supports many trout, and is used at the Hot Creek Fish Hatchery. The creek was closed to swimming in 2006 after geothermal activity in the area increased. The area has a number of other hot springs, some of which are open to bathers.

== Geology ==
The source of volcanism at Long Valley is still an active subject of research and debate. Most studies link volcanic activity to regional extension from the Basin and Range Province. Intrusions of mantle-derived basalt rise into the deep crust which supplies heat and volatiles that generate and repeatedly recharge a shallow silicic reservoir by partial melting of continental crust. Long Valley is not above a hotspot, nor is it the result of subduction as in the Cascades.

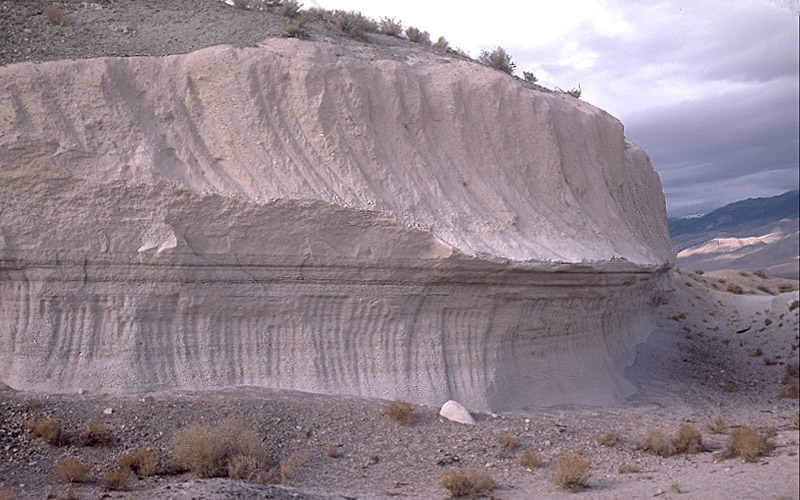
Layers of the Bishop tuff, in a rock quarry in Chalfant Valley, about 25 km (16 mi) southwest of the Long Valley Caldera, laid down in phases of a major eruption 760,000 years ago.

The known volcanic history of Long Valley Caldera area started a few million years ago when magma began to collect several miles below the surface. Volcanic activity became concentrated in the vicinity of the present site of Long Valley Caldera 3.1 to 2.5 million years ago with eruptions of rhyodacite followed by high-silica rhyolite from 2.1 to 0.8 million years ago. After some time, a cluster of mostly rhyolitic volcanoes formed in the area. All told, about 1,500 square miles (3,900 km^{2}) were covered by lava.

All but one of these volcanoes, 1–2-million-year-old Glass Mountain (made of obsidian), were destroyed by the major (VEI-7) eruption of the area 760,000 years ago, which released 600 cubic kilometers (144 cu mi) of material from vents just inside the margin of the caldera. (The 1980 Mount St. Helens eruption was a VEI-5 eruption releasing 1.2 km^{3} (0.29 cu mi).) About half of this material was ejected in a series of pyroclastic flows of a very hot (1,500 °F (820 °C)) mixture of gases, pumice, and volcanic ash that covered the surrounding area hundreds of feet deep. One lobe of this material moved south into Owens Valley, past present-day Big Pine. Another lobe moved west over the crest of the Sierra Nevada and into the drainage of the San Joaquin River. The rest of the pyroclastic material, along with 300 km^{3} (72 cu mi) of other matter, was blown as far as 25 miles (40 km) into the air where winds distributed it as far away as eastern Nebraska and Kansas.

The eruption initially produced a caldera 2–3 km (1.2–1.9 mi) deep. However, much of the ejecta went straight up, fell down, and filled the initial caldera about two-thirds full.

=== Eruptions ===
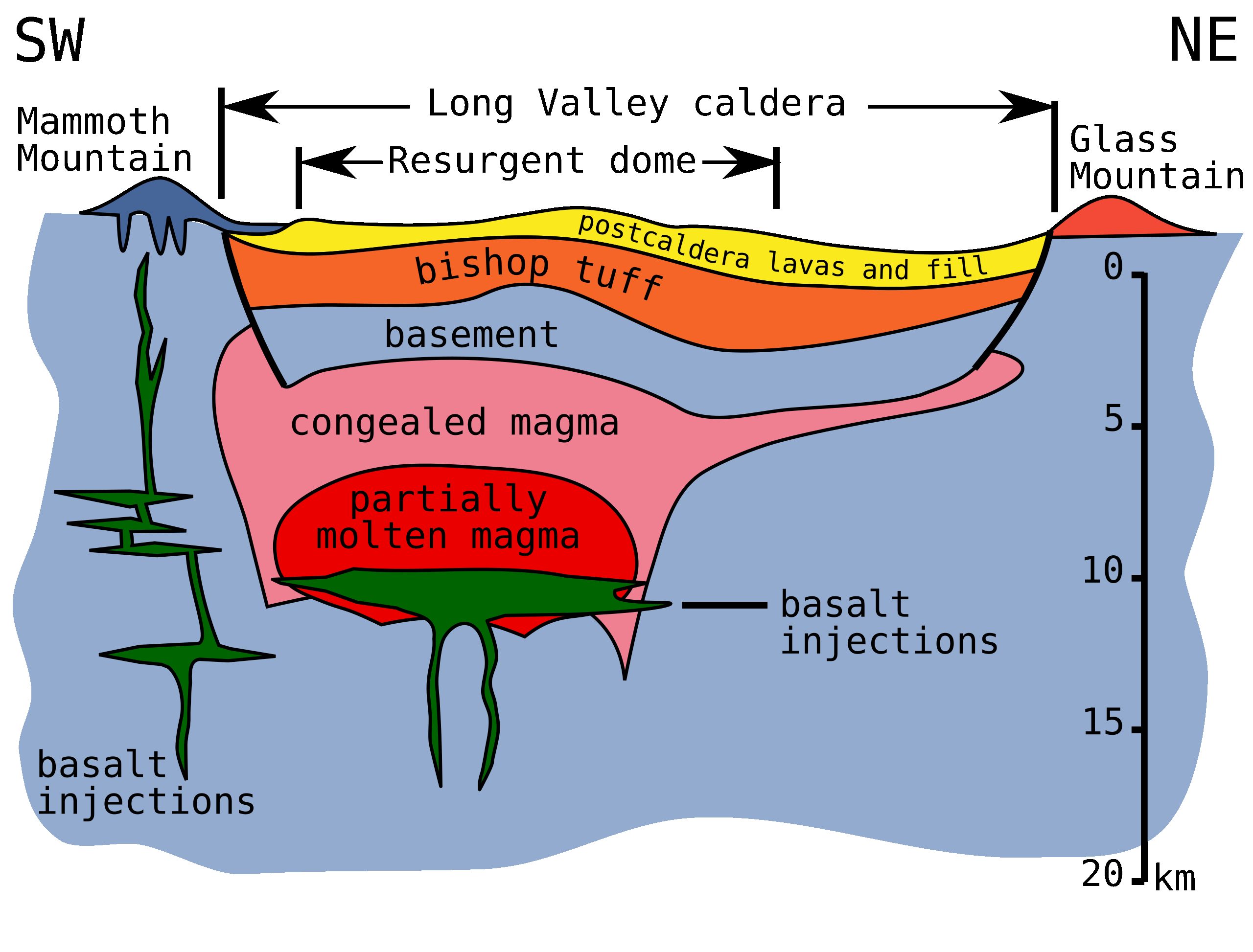
Cross-section through Long Valley

Subsequent eruptions from the Long Valley magma chamber were confined within the caldera with extrusions of relatively hot (crystal-free) rhyolite 700,000 to 600,000 years ago as the caldera floor was uplifted to form the resurgent dome followed by extrusions of cooler, crystal-rich moat rhyolite at 200,000-year intervals (500,000, 300,000, and 100,000 years ago) in clockwise succession around the dome. The declining volcanic activity and increasingly crystalline lava extruded over the last 650,000 years, as well as other trends, suggest that the magma reservoir under the caldera has now largely crystallized and is unlikely to produce large-scale eruptions in the future.

The Long Valley volcano is unusual in that it has produced eruptions of both basaltic and silicic lava in the same geological place.

Water from the Owens River filled the caldera to a depth of 300 meters (984 ft) as of 600,000 years ago. At that time, the lake surface was at an elevation near 7,500 feet (2,300 m). The lake drained sometime in the last 100,000 years after it overtopped the southern rim of the caldera, eroded the sill, and created the Owens River Gorge. A human-made dam in the gorge has created Crowley Lake, a partial restoration of the original lake. Since the great eruption, many hot springs developed in the area, and the resurgent dome has uplifted.

During the last ice age, glaciers filled the canyons leading to Long Valley, but the valley floor was clear of ice. Excellent examples of terminal moraines can be seen at Long Valley. Laurel Creek, Convict Creek, and McGee Creek each have prominent moraines.

=== Recent activity ===
In May 1980, a strong earthquake swarm that included four Richter magnitude 6 earthquakes struck the southern margin of the Long Valley Caldera. It was associated with a 10-inch (25 cm) dome-shaped uplift of the caldera floor. These events marked the onset of the latest period of caldera unrest that is ongoing. This ongoing unrest includes recurring earthquake swarms and continued dome-shaped uplift of the central section of the caldera accompanied by changes in thermal springs and gas emissions. After the quake, a secondary access road was created as a potential escape route for the town of Mammoth Lakes. Its name at first was proposed as the "Mammoth Escape Route" but was changed to the Mammoth Scenic Loop after Mammoth-area businesses and landowners complained.

In 1982, the United States Geological Survey under the Volcano Hazards Program began an intensive effort to monitor and study geologic unrest in Long Valley Caldera. The goal is to provide residents and civil authorities with reliable information on the nature of the potential hazards posed by this unrest and timely warning of an impending volcanic eruption, should it develop. Most, perhaps all, volcanic eruptions are preceded and accompanied by geophysical and geochemical changes in the volcanic system. Common precursory indicators of volcanic activity include increased seismicity, ground deformation, and variations in the nature and rate of gas emissions.

=== Hydrothermal system ===
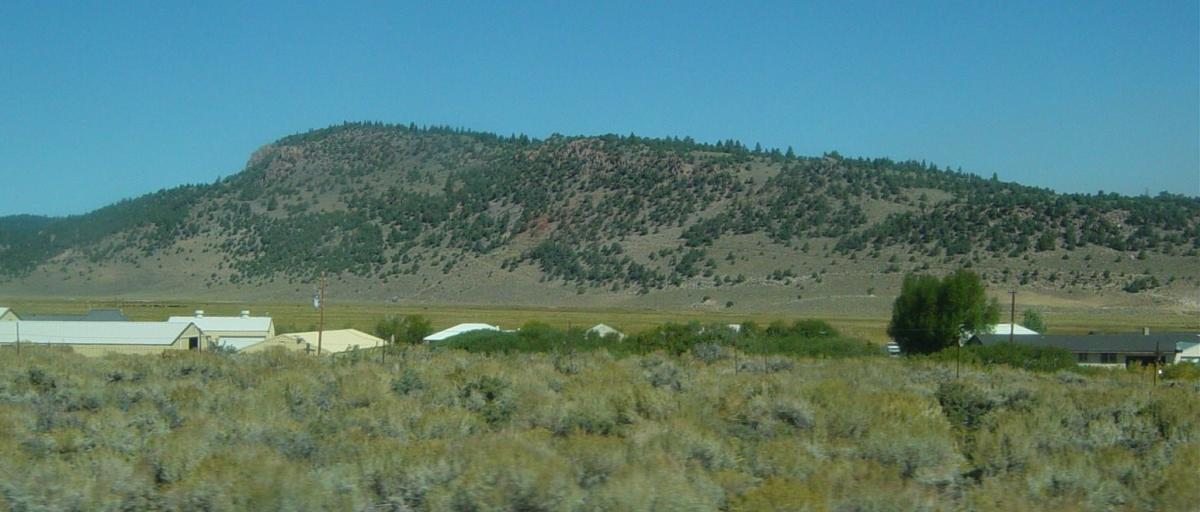
Hot Creek Fish Hatchery at base of Resurgent Dome

The Long Valley Caldera hosts an active hydrothermal system that includes hot springs, fumaroles (steam vents), and mineral deposits. Hot springs exist primarily in the eastern half of the caldera where land-surface elevations are relatively low; fumaroles exist primarily in the western half where elevations are higher. Mineral deposits from thermal activity are found on an uplifted area called the resurgent dome, at Little Hot Creek springs, Hot Creek Gorge, and other locations in the south and east moats of the caldera.

Hot springs discharge primarily in Hot Creek Gorge, along Little Hot Creek, and in the Alkali Lakes area. The largest springs are in Hot Creek Gorge where about 250 litres (66 US gal) per second of thermal water discharge and account for about 80% of the total thermal water discharge in the caldera. At the other extreme are springs at Hot Creek Fish Hatchery which contain a small component (2–5%) of thermal water that raises water temperatures about 5 °C (9.0 °F) higher than background temperatures. Use of the warm spring water in the hatchery has increased fish production because trout growth rates are faster in the warm water than in ambient stream temperatures in Long Valley.

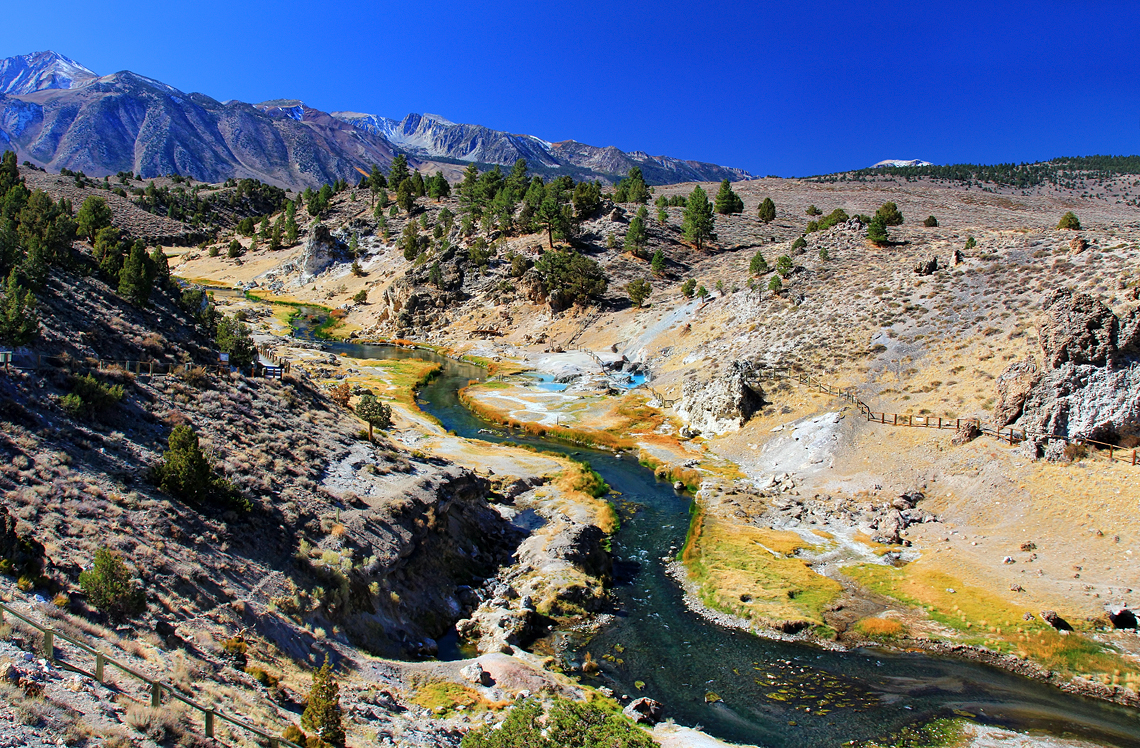
Hot Creek in the summer

In hydrothermal systems, the circulation of groundwater is driven by a combination of topography and heat sources. In Long Valley Caldera, the system is recharged primarily from snowmelt in the highlands around the western and southern rims of the caldera. The water from snowmelt and rainfall infiltrates to depths of a few kilometers, where it is heated to at least 220 °C (428 °F) by hot rock near geologically young intrusions. Upflow occurs in the west moat where the heated water with lower density rises along steeply inclined fractures to depths of 1–2 km (0.62–1.24 mi). This hydrothermal fluid flows laterally, down the hydraulic gradient, from the west to the southeast around the resurgent dome and then eastward to discharge points along Hot Creek and around Crowley Lake. Reservoir temperatures in the volcanic fill decline from 220 °C (428 °F) near the Inyo Craters to 50 °C (122 °F) near Crowley Lake due to a combination of heat loss and mixing with cold water.

Hot Creek has been a popular swimming hole for decades. Over a dozen people have died in Hot Creek since the late 1960s, but most of these deaths happened to people who ignored the numerous warning signs and attempted to use the hydrothermal pools as hot tubs (like the stream portion of the creek, these pools alternate in temperature, but the eruptions in the pools are of super-heated water in already very hot water). Recent geothermal instability has led to its temporary closure for swimming. Officials are unsure of when (if ever) Hot Creek will officially reopen for swimming.

Hydrothermal activity has altered many rocks in the caldera, transforming them into travertine and clay. At the Huntley clay mine, white chalky clay called kaolinite is mined; the kaolinite is exposed on the resurgent dome and appears as a brilliant white band.

== Tourism and hiking ==
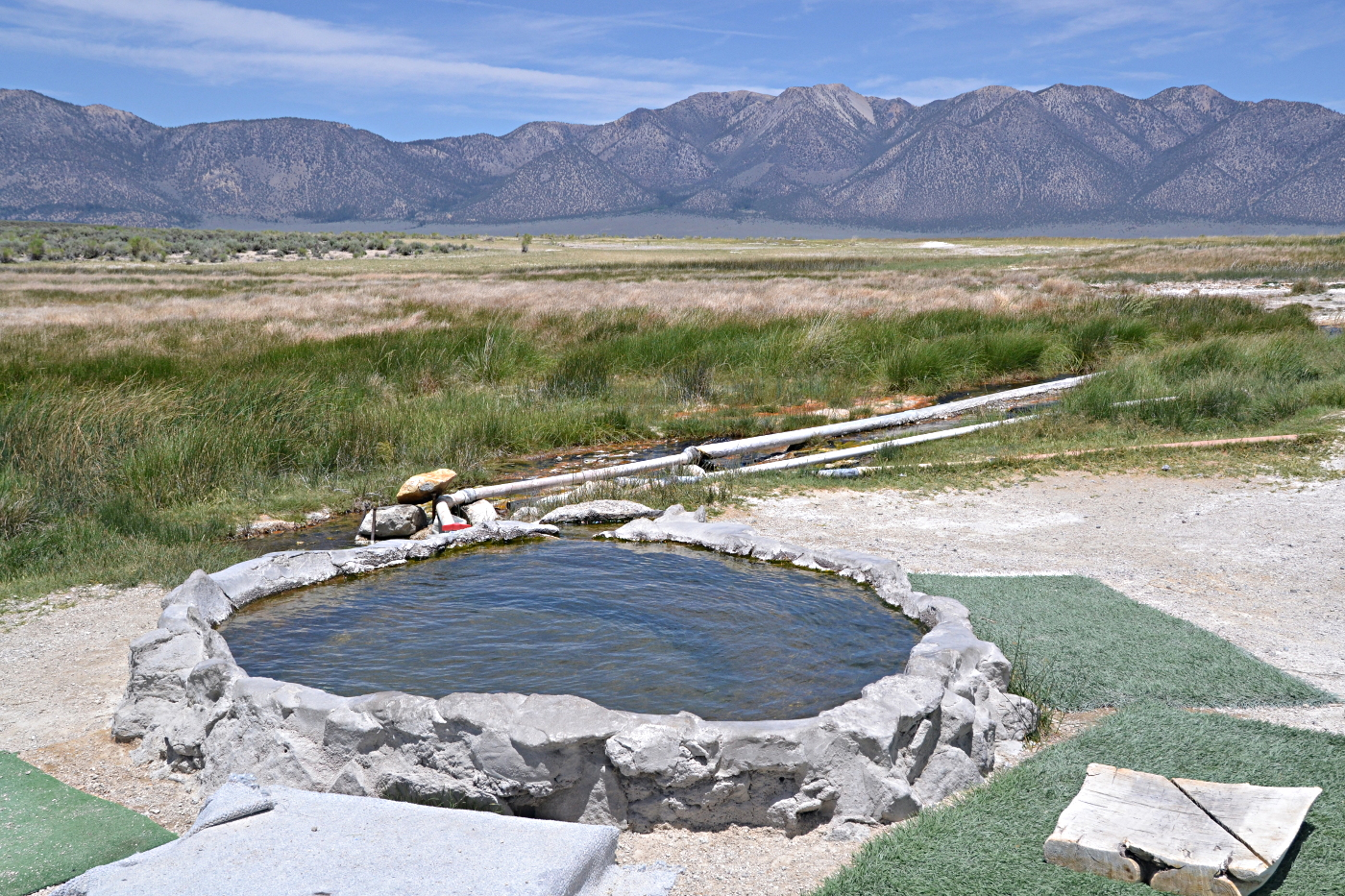
Hilltop Hot Spring

The largest tourist attraction in the caldera is the Mammoth Mountain Ski Area: the area offers skiing and snowboarding in the winter, and mountain biking in the summer. The Hot Creek tourist attraction was closed to swimming in 2006 due to increased geothermal activity.

Hiking and off-road vehicle driving is available throughout the caldera, and in the glacial valleys of the Sherwin Range, immediately to the south of the caldera. Hikers can hike to several lakes in these glacial valleys, including Valentine Lake, Convict Lake, Lake Dorothy, and Laurel Lakes. Crowley Lake, at the south end of the caldera, is noted for its fishing.

The nearest hotel accommodations to the caldera are in Mammoth Lakes. There are also campgrounds scattered throughout the caldera, and in the mountains near the edge of the caldera.

== Fatalities ==
In April 2006, three members of the Mammoth Mountain Ski Area ski patrol died while on duty. All three died from suffocation by carbon dioxide when they fell into a fumarole on the slopes of the mountain while attempting to fence it off.

== See also ==
- List of large volume volcanic eruptions in the Basin and Range Province
- Glass Mountain
- Map of Long Valley-Mono area
- Mono–Inyo Craters
- Mammoth Geothermal Complex - a geothermal power plant in the area
