= Owens River =

River in eastern California

Owens River Wakopee
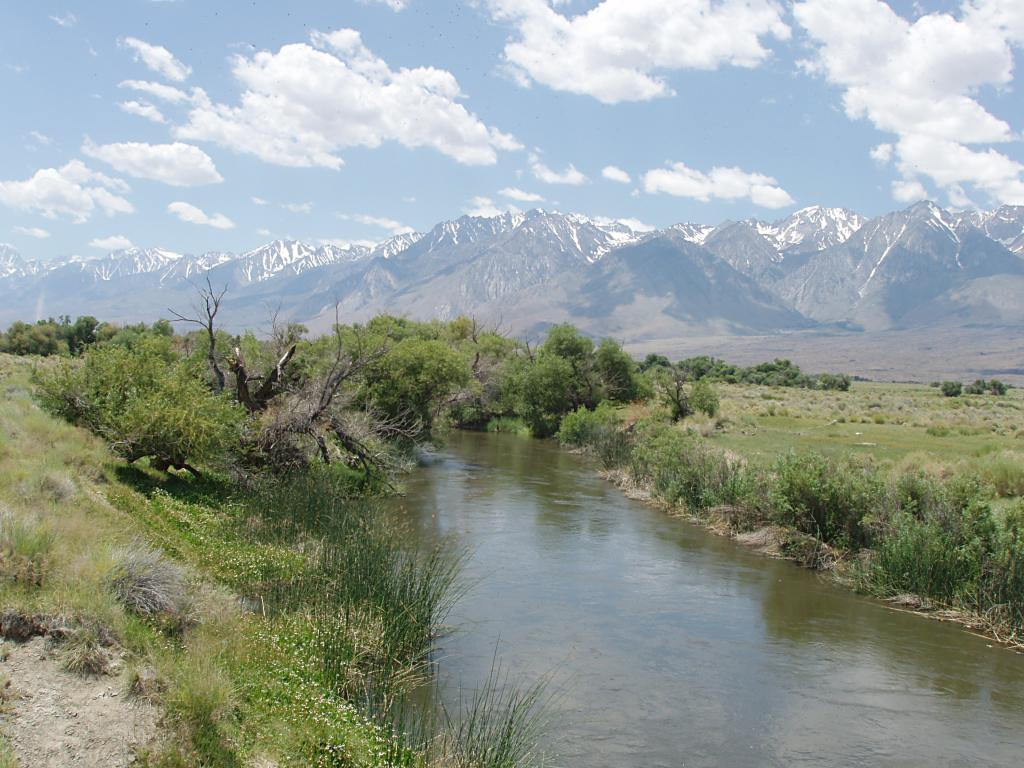
- Owens River south of Poverty Hills

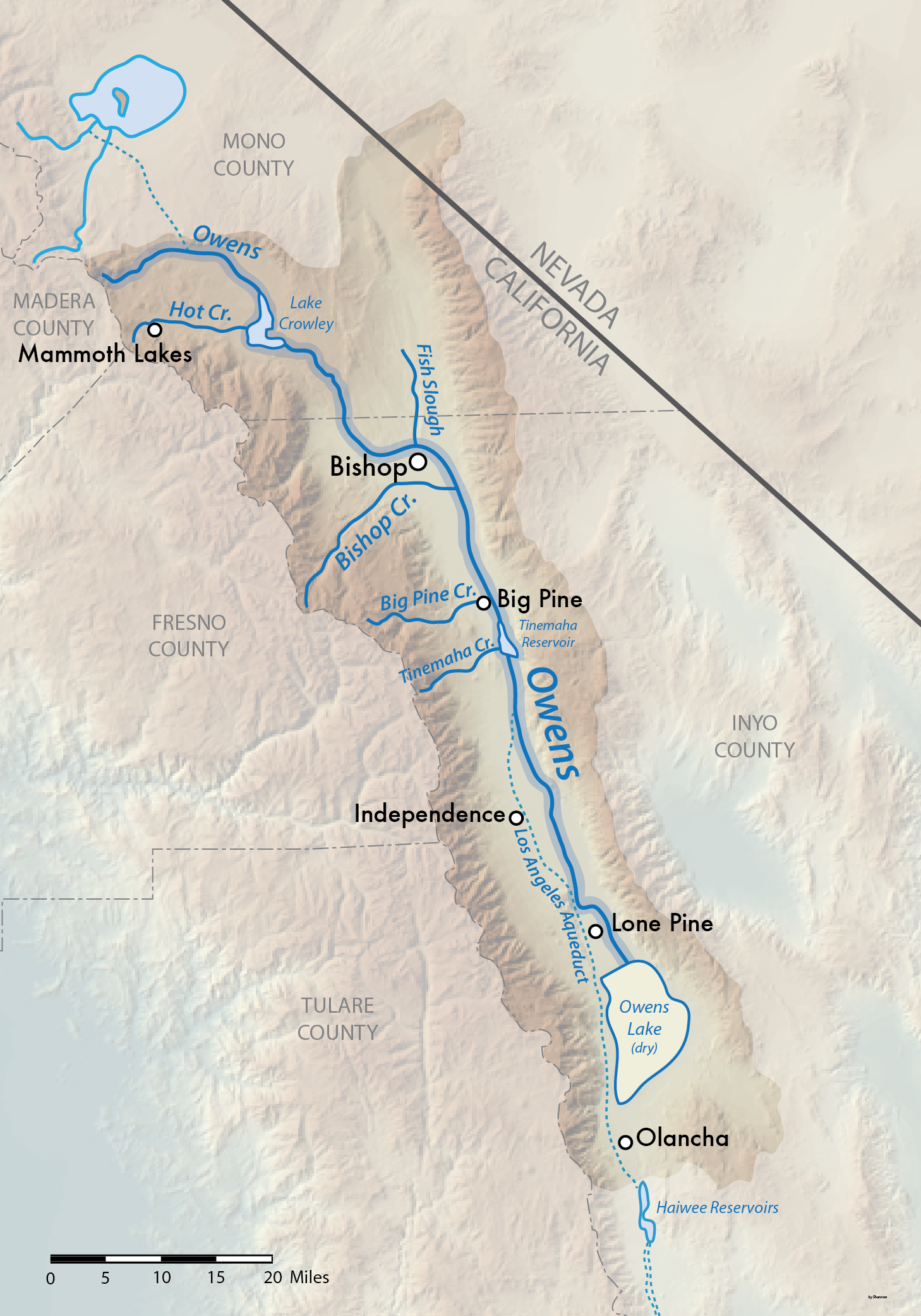
- Map of the Owens Lake watershed, including Los Angeles Aqueduct system

- Location of the mouth of the Owens River in California

Location
- Country: United States
- State: California
- District: Mono County, Inyo County
- Cities: Mesa, Bishop, Big Pine, Elna (site), Chrysopolis (site), Independence, Lone Pine

Physical characteristics
- Source: Confluence of Deadman Creek and an unnamed stream
  - location: Inyo National Forest, Mono County
  - coordinates: 37°45′01″N 118°56′20″W
  - elevation: 7,251 ft (2,210 m)
- Mouth: Owens Lake
  - location: A few miles northwest of Keeler, Inyo County
  - coordinates: 36°32′31″N 117°58′45″W
  - elevation: 3,592 ft (1,095 m)
- Length: 183 mi (295 km), north-south
- Basin size: 2,604 sq mi (6,740 km^{2})
- Discharge
  - location: Big Pine, CA
  - average: 389 cu ft/s (11.0 m^{3}/s)
  - minimum: 51.9 cu ft/s (1.47 m^{3}/s)
  - maximum: 3,220 cu ft/s (91 m^{3}/s)

Basin features
- Tributaries
  - left: Spring Valley Wash, Silver Canyon Creek, Coldwater Canyon Creek
  - right: Hot Creek, Rock Creek, Bishop Creek, Big Pine Creek, Birch Creek, Independence Creek, Lone Pine Creek

National Wild and Scenic River
- Designated: March 30, 2009

The Owens River is a river in eastern California in the United States, approximately 183 miles (295 km) long. It drains into and through the Owens Valley, an arid basin between the eastern slope of the Sierra Nevada and the western faces of the Inyo and White Mountains. The river terminates at the endorheic Owens Lake south of Lone Pine, at the bottom of a 2,600 mi^{2} (6,700 km^{2}) watershed.

In the early 1900s, the Owens River was the focus of the California Water Wars, fought between the city of Los Angeles and the inhabitants of Owens Valley over the construction of the Los Angeles Aqueduct. Since 1913, the Owens River has been diverted to Los Angeles, causing the ruin of the valley's economy and the drying of Owens Lake. In winter 2006, the Los Angeles Department of Water and Power restored 5% of the pre-aqueduct flow to the river by court order, allowing the Owens River Gorge, the river bed in the valley, and Owens Lake to contain a small amount of water.

== Course ==
The river rises in the Sierra Nevada in southwestern Mono County, approximately 15 miles (24.1 km) south of Mono Lake and 35 miles (56.3 km) east of Yosemite Valley. It flows southeast across the Long Valley Caldera, through Lake Crowley reservoir, then descends through the 20-mile-long (32 km) Owens River Gorge, emerging at the north end of the Owens Valley northwest of Bishop. In the area around Bishop, it is diverted through many ditches to irrigate the surrounding farming region. It flows south-southeast through the Owens Valley between the Sierra Nevada on the west and the White and Inyo Mountains on the east, past Big Pine. Approximately 14 miles (22.5 km) south-southeast of Big Pine, most of the remaining river is diverted into the Los Angeles Aqueduct, completed in 1913 to supply municipal, recreational and agricultural water to Los Angeles. The remaining river flows through the southern valley, flanked by the Los Angeles Aqueduct, past Lone Pine, entering the lake bed of predominantly dry Owens Lake at the southern end of Owens Valley.

== Watershed ==
The river flows through two major valleys of the extreme southwestern Great Basin – the Long Valley and Owens Valley. The north to south drainage basin is in portions of Mono and Inyo counties and terminates in the now-dry Owens Lake. To the northwest of the valley is the Long Valley Caldera, which is only a fraction of the size of the Owens Valley. The Owens River enters Owens Valley from the northwest, while the Spring Valley Wash drains the northernmost part of the valley, extending a tiny portion of the basin into Nevada. The river flows mainly on the east side of the valley, because alluvial deposits from Sierra Nevada streams have forced the river channel in that direction.

Vertical relief in the basin is immense – elevations range from 14,505 feet (4,421 m) at Mount Whitney, the highest peak in the continental United States, to 3,556 feet (1,084 m) on the bed of Owens Lake. The Owens River itself heads at an elevation of 7,291 feet (2,222 m). Few people inhabit the sparse, open grasslands and steep mountainsides of the watershed; the 2009 population of Mono County was about 12,927 while Inyo County had some 17,293 inhabitants. The largest city on the river is Bishop, with a population of just under 4,000. Other significant towns include Lone Pine (population 2,035), Big Pine (population 1,707), and Independence (population 669).

== Geology ==
The Owens River flows through part of the Basin and Range Province of North America's Great Basin. The Owens Valley is a graben or rift valley, a section of land that has dropped down between two parallel faults, while the land on either side has risen. This has resulted in the flat floor and steep, towering walls of the present-day valley. With the Sierra Nevada on the west side and the Inyo Mountains and White Mountains on the east, with the highest peaks of either range rising to over 14,000 feet (4,300 m) and the floor of the valley at a comparatively low 3,000 to 4,000 feet (910 to 1,220 m), the Owens River flows in one of the deepest valleys in the United States.

Further to the north, the Owens River basin encompasses predominantly igneous rocks and vast remnants of past volcanic activity. The upper 30 miles (48 km) of the river run through the Long Valley Caldera, an enormous 20-mile-wide (32 km) crater formed by a volcanic eruption some 760,000 years ago. The eruption's resulting ash cloud covered much of the southwestern United States, including parts of ten U.S. states. Mammoth Mountain, to the southwest (more popularly known as a major ski area) also formed from eruptions related to the Long Valley Caldera. To the north of the Caldera, extending to the Mono Lake area, lie the chain of Mono-Inyo Craters, which range in age from 400,000 to 500 years old.

During the Pleistocene at the end of the last glacial period, melting glaciers in the Sierra Nevada and Inyo/White Mountains fed prodigious amounts of runoff into the Owens River, causing it to expand to many times its current size. The increased river volume caused Owens Lake to rise as well, eventually spilling out the south side of the valley into the Mojave Desert. Ancient, now-abandoned river channels suggest that the extended Owens River ran south to China Lake, then east into Searles Lake, north into the Panamint Valley (where it formed Panamint Lake), and finally east into Death Valley and the ancient Lake Manly. This great inland sea was also fed by the Mojave River from the south, the Amargosa River from the east, and the Death Valley Wash from the north. During this relatively short time, the Owens River became part of a vast interior drainage system that stretched east to west, covering over 8,000 square miles (21,000 km^{2}). During the runoff peak, water from this massive basin may have escaped to the Colorado River through a valley leading to the southeast.

== History ==
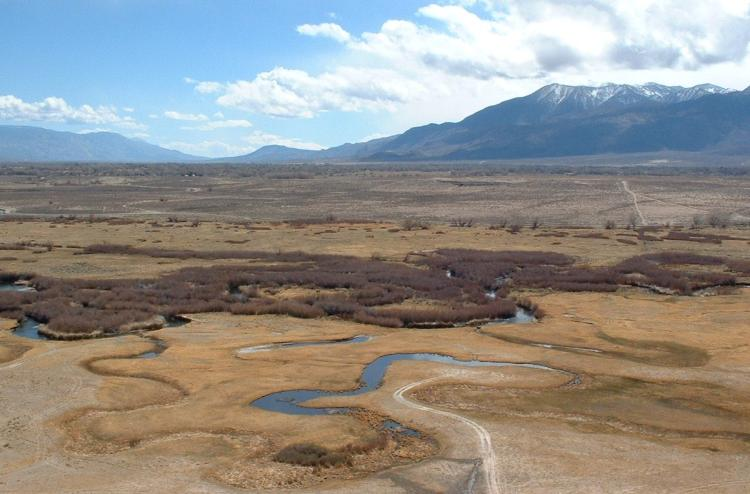
The semi-arid Owens Valley, with the Owens River flowing through the foreground

For thousands of years the Owens River valley was inhabited by the seminomadic Owens Valley Northern Paiute and the Shoshone tribes of Native Americans. The indigenous name for the river was Wakopee, while they called Owens Lake Pacheta. In the upper Owens Valley lie traces of some of California's first irrigation systems, created by Paiute groups to water small patches of crops. It is believed that native people in the upper portion of the valley once built dams across the Owens River (and possibly one of its major tributaries, Bishop Creek) to divert water into local canals. The switch from a hunter-gatherer to a settled, agricultural lifestyle is probably the result of the climate of the Owens Valley becoming drier some 1,000 years ago.

Typically, the Native Americans built dams across the river or other tributary streams in the spring out of materials including boulders, dirt, reeds, grass, or other elements. The watercourse below the dam would then be desiccated, and the water led by canal to the irrigated plot of land, typically no more than a few square miles. Directly after the dam was closed and the river dried up, fish trapped on the dry riverbed would then be gathered and eaten. Before winter storms caused floods, the dam would be breached, allowing the river to flow naturally again, while fish would be collected in the dried-up river channel. By then, there would be enough food stored to last the winter in which the cropland would lie fallow.

In the nineteenth century, the Owens River was first seen by American explorers. One of the first explorers was John C. Fremont, who led a cartographic expedition to the Owens Valley in 1845. His party included Kit Carson, Edward Kern, and Richard Owens, the latter for whom the river, lake, and valley are named. Other well-known adventurers included Jedediah Smith and Joseph R. Walker, who also came into the area in the 1800s. Gradually, the river's surroundings were settled by farmers and ranchers. The valley never accumulated a very large population, but mining activities brought significant income to the new inhabitants of the area. Ore was shipped down the Owens River from the north, and also borax and silver from Death Valley to the east. Until 1924, Owens Lake was still so large that a steamboat ferry operated between its east and west sides, ferrying freight and passengers across in three hours, much less than the three days required to semi-circumnavigate the lake. In 1872, the Lone Pine earthquake killed 27 people in the Owens Valley, mostly in Lone Pine.

== Ecology ==
Beaver was re-introduced to the Owens Valley by the California Department of Fish and Game in 1948 in Baker Creek, and has since spread throughout the Owens Valley. Although it is controversial whether beaver were once native to the Owens Valley, there is growing evidence that they were native to the eastern slope of the Sierra Nevada. In particular, the northern Paiute of Walker Lake, Honey Lake and Pyramid Lake have a word for beaver su-i'-tu-ti-kut'-teh. When Stephen Powers visited the northern Paiute to collect Indian materials for the Smithsonian Institution in preparation for the Centennial Exhibition of 1876, he reported that the northern Paiute wrapped their hair in strips of beaver fur, made medicine from parts of beaver and that their creation legend included beaver. In addition, fur trapper Stephen Hall Meek "set his traps on the Truckee River in 1833", which strongly suggests that he saw a beaver or beaver sign. Supporting this line of evidence, Tappe records in 1941 an eyewitness who said beaver were plentiful on the upper part of the Carson River and its tributaries in Alpine County until 1892 when they fell victim to heavy trapping.

In 2011, the Los Angeles Department of Water and Power (LADWP) decided to trap beaver (Castor canadensis) out of the Owens Valley, claiming that beaver are damming flows into their diversions of water to Los Angeles. This decision runs counter to an independent assessment commissioned by LADWP and the Inyo County Water Department in 1997, where it was recommended that beaver be maintained in reasonable populations and their dams left in place because "Although beaver activity has resulted in the removal of much willow and other shrub and woody vegetation and the dams create favorable tule conditions and reduce fish spawning habitat, they also provide important fish rearing habitat, mesic meadows, and promote the growth of other riparian species. It is most likely that the physical removal of beaver dams will result in more adverse environmental impacts than environmental benefits."

=== Water rights controversy ===
The acquisition of water rights for the Los Angeles Aqueduct under the direction of William Mulholland was highly controversial and led to violence and sabotage by local residents in the 1920s. The diversion of water and the subsequent desiccation of Owens Lake remains highly controversial, and the restoration of the lake has been a long-time goal of the California environmentalist community. The lower Owens River and Owens Lake were left dry by the 1913 diversions, until lawsuits forced LADWP to start releasing water into the 62 mi (100 km) lower Owens River in December 2006. In less than one year, the lower Owens River was teeming with fish, birds and other wildlife.

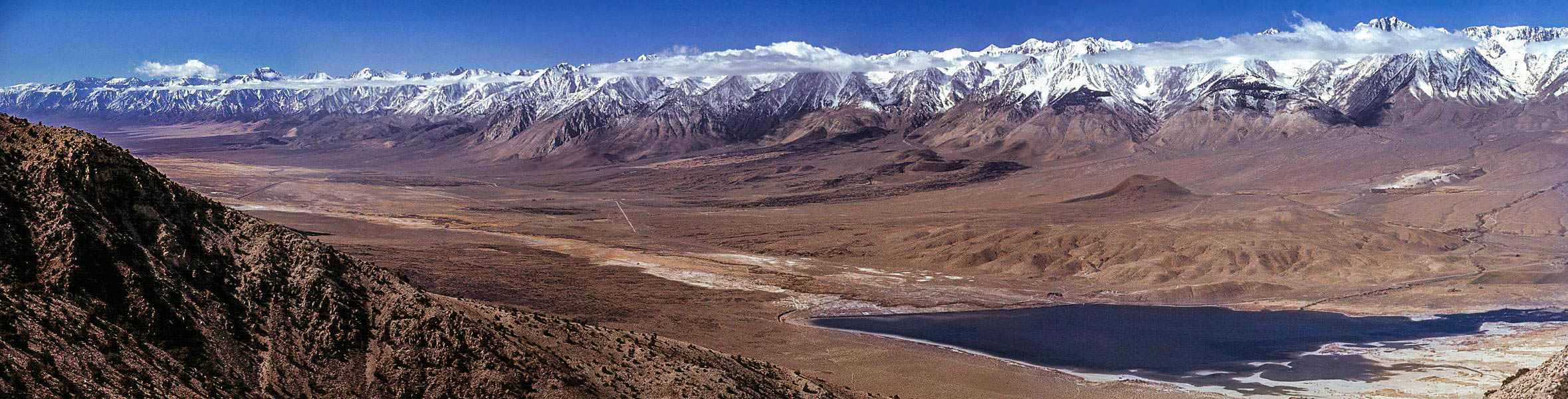
Panorama of the Owens River Valley from the Inyo Mountains. The large body of water is the Tinemaha Reservoir.

== See also ==
- List of rivers of California
- Owens Valley Indian War

== Works cited ==
- Hundley, Norris (2001). The great thirst: Californians and water – a history. University of California Press. ISBN 0-520-22456-6.
