= Crowley Lake =

Reservoir in California, United States

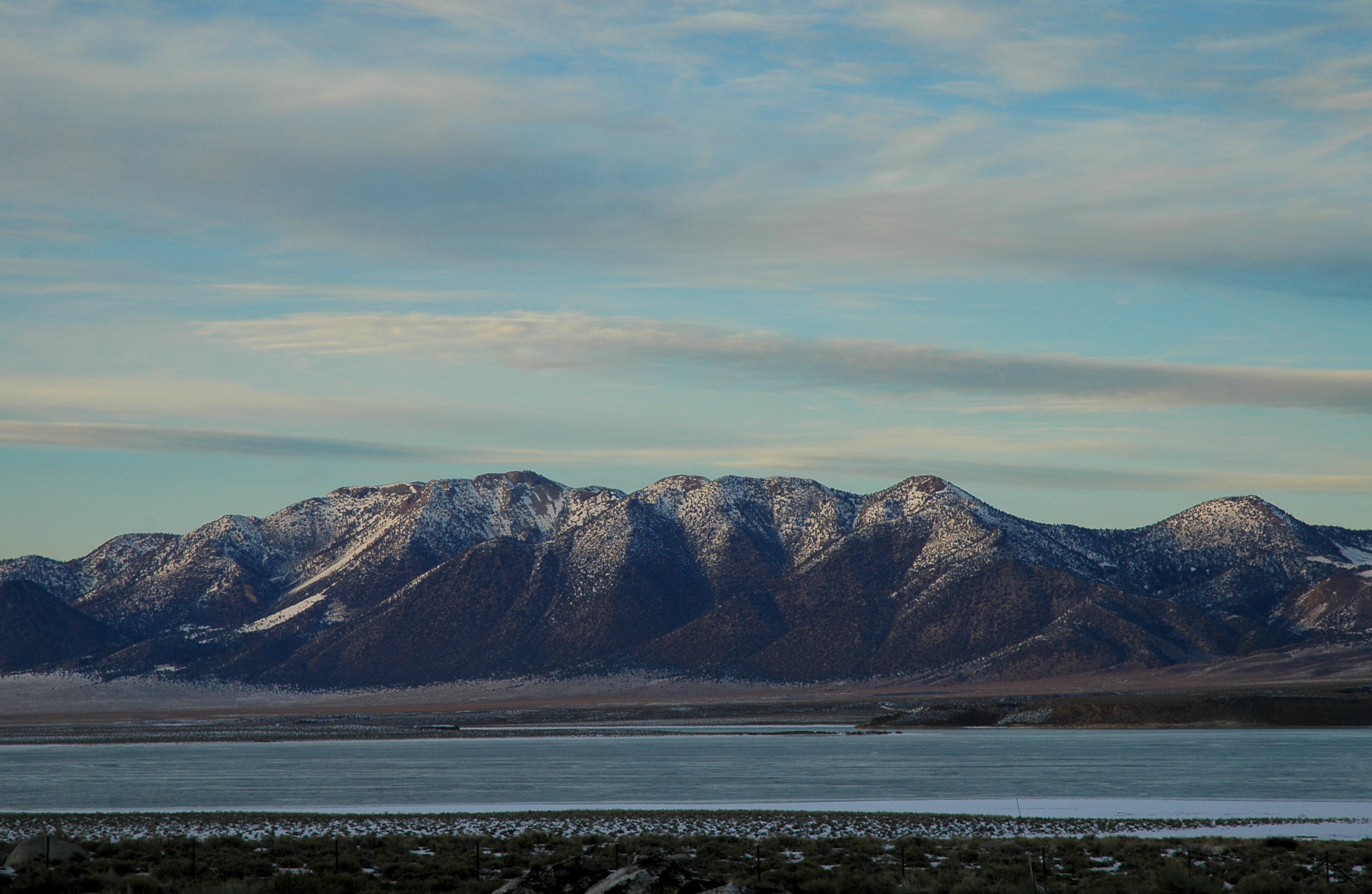

- Location within California Location within the United States
- Location: Mono County, California
- Coordinates: 37°37′2.46″N 118°44′22.92″W
- Lake type: Reservoir
- Primary inflows: Owens River
- Primary outflows: Owens River
- Basin countries: United States
- Built: 1941; 85 years ago
- Max. length: 12 mi (19 km)
- Max. width: 5 mi (8.0 km) at widest point
- Surface area: 5,300 acres (21 km^{2})
- Average depth: 40 ft (12 m)
- Max. depth: 100 ft (30 m)
- Shore length^{1}: 45 mi (72 km)
- Surface elevation: 6,781 ft (2,067 m)
- Website: Official website
- ^{1} Shore length is not a well-defined measure.

Crowley Lake is a reservoir on the upper Owens River in southern Mono County, California, in the United States. Crowley Lake is 15 mi (24 km) south of Mammoth Lakes.

The lake was created in 1941 by the building of the Long Valley Dam by the Los Angeles Department of Water and Power (DWP), as storage for the Los Angeles Aqueduct and for flood control. The dam is 126 ft (38 m) high and impounds 183,465 acre⋅ft (0.226301 km^{3}). For more on the history of the lake, see Owens Lake.

It is known for its trout fishing. Between 6,000 and 10,000 anglers hit the lake on opening day. Crowley Lake Fish Camp, run in cooperation with the Los Angeles Department of Water and Power, is the only way to access the lake, and visitors can rent boats, book camping sites, and buy supplies at the Fish Camp.

The lake is named after Fr. John J. Crowley, "the desert Padre", who was a key figure in Owens Valley history and a local hero. When it became obvious that the city of Los Angeles's appropriation of the water supply had made agriculture impossible in the Owens Valley, many of the residents of the Valley lost all hope. Father Crowley traveled the Valley, convincing many of them that it could become a tourist destination; however, he was critical of where the dam was to be located. Father Crowley was killed in 1940 in an automobile accident.

== Columns ==
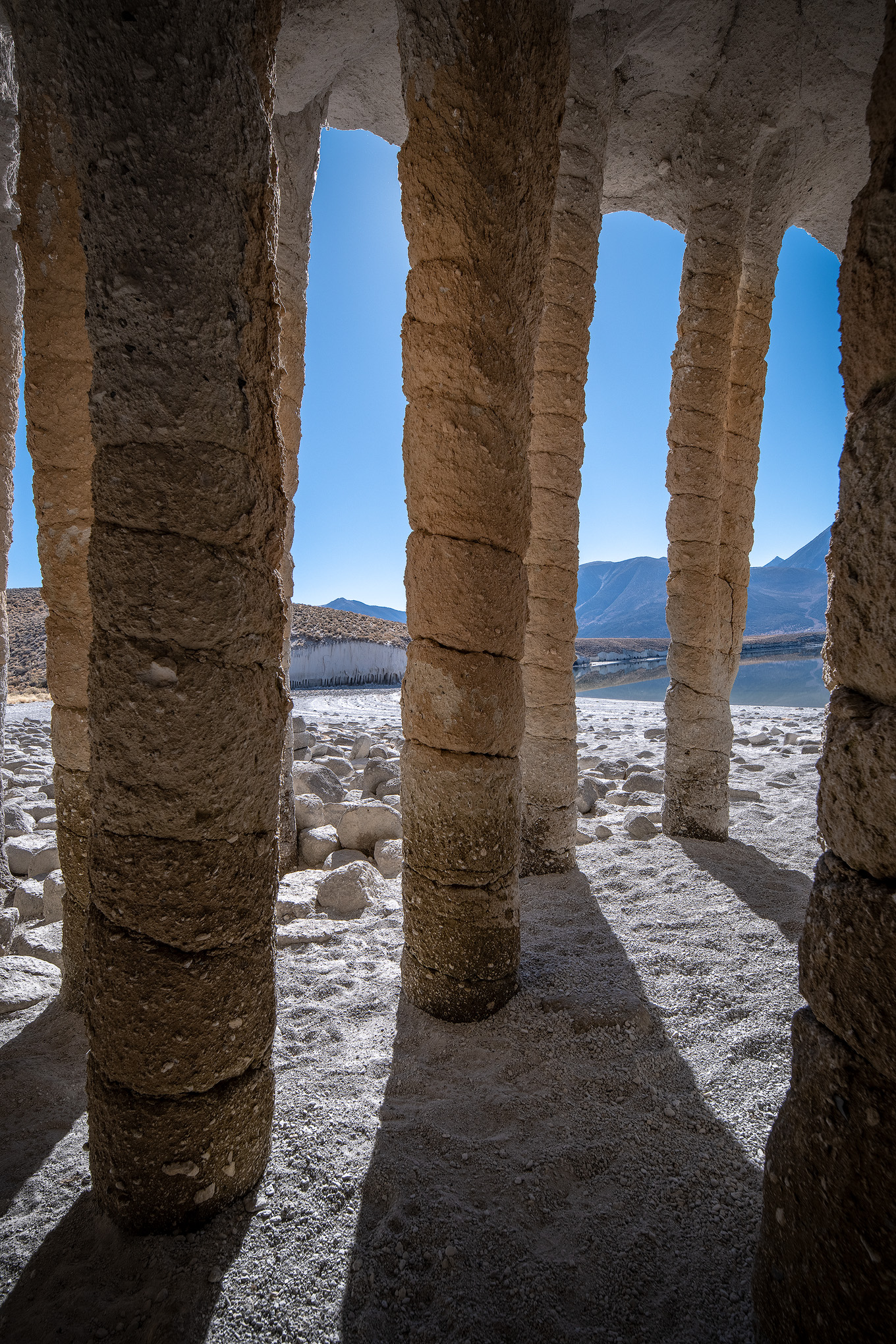
Columns at Crowley Lake California

Upon completion of the reservoir in 1941, strange columnar formations were spotted along its eastern shore. These formations feature spaced columns, some rising 20 ft (6 m) tall, spanned at the top with arches and resembling the arcades of Moorish architecture. For decades speculative theories of their natural origin were proposed, but no detailed study was conducted.

In 2015 geologists from UC Berkeley concluded that the formations are the result of snowmelt seeping down into volcanic ash from the catastrophic eruption of the Long Valley Caldera, then rising up again as steam. The water deposited erosion-resistant minerals that remained behind as the ash eroded around them. The researchers counted nearly 5,000 such pillars, which appear in groups and vary widely in shape, size, and color over an area of 4,000 acres (1,600 ha). Some of the columns stand erect approximately a foot apart and feature ringed apertures. Others are warped or leaning at various angles, and others are half-submerged and resemble the petrified remains of dinosaur vertebrae.

== See also ==
- List of lakes in California
- List of dams and reservoirs in California
