= Rainbow Canyon (California) =

Canyon in Death Valley National Park, California

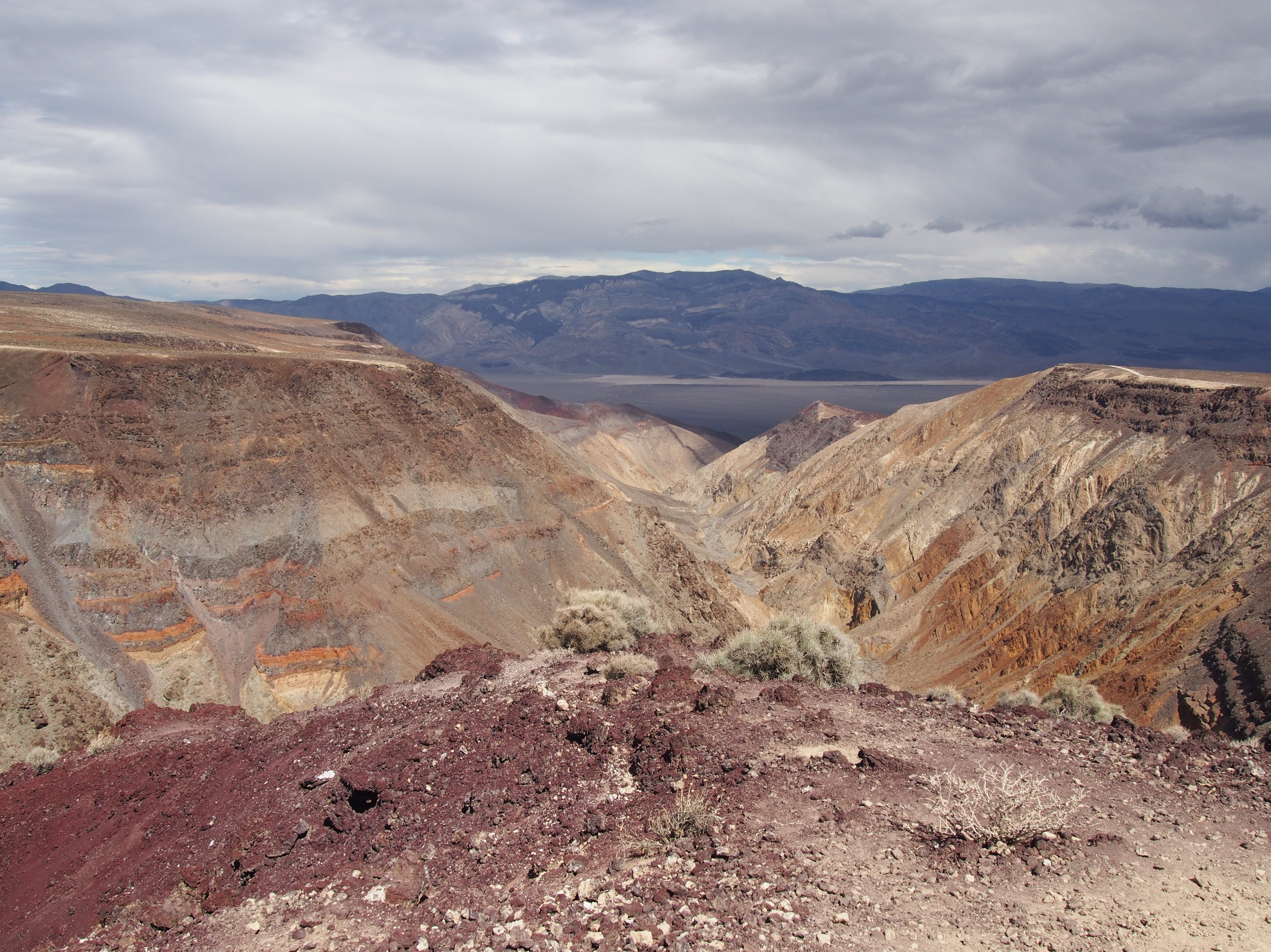

- Location within California Location within the United States
- Floor elevation: 1,854 feet (565 m)
- Length: 5.5 miles (8.9 km)

Geography
- Location: Death Valley National Park, Inyo County, California, U.S.
- Coordinates: 36°21′45″N 117°31′12″W
- Interactive map of Rainbow Canyon

Rainbow Canyon (nicknamed Star Wars Canyon and Jedi Transition) is a canyon inside Death Valley National Park in Inyo County, California, on the park's western border. It is about 130 miles (210 km) west of Las Vegas and 160 miles (260 km) north of Los Angeles.

From World War II until 2019, it was commonly used by the U.S. Air Force and U.S. Navy as well as by other military aircraft operators for fighter jet training and was frequented by photographers who, from the canyon rim, were able to photograph jets flying beneath them. The canyon rim can be reached from Father Crowley Overlook off California State Route 190.

== History, geology, and topography ==
The canyon was cut from basalt lava flows and lapilli beds of the Darwin Hills volcanoes, which last erupted between two and four million years ago during the Pliocene epoch. Formations of granite and marble (metamorphosed Paleozoic limestone), including calc-silicate hornfels occur below the lava in the deepest parts of the canyon. Other pyroclastic rock is also exposed. This variety of material created walls of reds, grey, and pink that are similar to the fictional Star Wars planet Tatooine. As a result, the canyon is nicknamed Star Wars Canyon. Hundreds of petroglyphs from the Coso people who once inhabited the area can be found in the canyon. Rainbow Canyon drains the west slope of the Santa Rosa Hills and the east slope of the Inyo Mountains into the Panamint Valley. The steep walls are up to 1,000 feet (300 m) tall.

== Flight training ==
Rainbow Canyon was among the few places in the world (Mach Loop is another) where photographers can see combat aircraft flying below them. Military training flights had used the canyon since World War II. Planes traveled through the canyon at 200 to 300 mph (320 to 480 km/h) and when flying as low as 200 feet (61 m) above the canyon floor were still only several hundred feet below observers on the rim. Observers could even see the pilots' facial expressions, who, aware of the audience, sometime gave gestures or other signals. The training area was most often used by jet fighters such as the F-15 Eagle, F-15E Strike Eagle, F-16 Fighting Falcon, F/A-18 Super Hornet, F-22 Raptor and F-35 Lightning II, but also by attack jets including the AV-8B Harrier and the A-10 Thunderbolt, training jets such as the T-38 Talon, electronic warfare aircraft such as the EA-6B Prowler and EA-18G Growler as well as by bombers and at least once, a C-17 Globemaster military transport jet and also by Lockheed C-130 Hercules military transport aircraft. In addition, the USAF has operated the F-117 Nighthawk stealth jet in the Rainbow Canyon area. NASA also flew its F/A-18 Hornet jets through the canyon. Foreign combat aircraft such as the Israeli Air Force F-16I Sufa, Royal Air Force Eurofighter Typhoon, Royal Air Force Panavia Tornado and the Sukhoi Su-30 MKI have been photographed or filmed making passes through the canyon. Air bases that conducted low-altitude training at Rainbow Canyon include Nellis Air Force Base, Naval Air Station Lemoore, NAWC China Lake, Marine Corps Air Station Miramar, Fresno Air National Guard Base and Edwards Air Force Base. The area lies within the Panamint military operations area. MOAs are used to separate military and non-participating IFR traffic. The marking on aviator's maps (so-called sectionals) also cautions VFR pilots and gives them a radio contact for querying status and traffic information, with the goal of allowing them to avoid intermingling Cessnas and other small general aviation aircraft with high performance fighter jets. Unlike many other locations around Edwards Air Force Base or more secretive airfields nearby, Rainbow Canyon is not part of restricted airspace.

Star Wars Canyon "below-the-rim" activity was suspended in August 2019, after an accident killed a pilot and injured several spectators on the ground following the crash of a U.S. Navy F/A-18 Super Hornet on 31 July 2019. A 1,500 feet (460 m) above-ground-level restriction was placed on the area; it remained in place as of March 2022. The 22 May 2022 version of the R-2508 Complex handbook instructed aircraft: "Maintain a minimum of 1000' above the lip of Rainbow Canyon." This restriction remained in the April 2024 update.

In January 2022, a Dassault Falcon 8X long-range business jet flew through the canyon below its lip, accompanied by another jet equipped with cameras.

== Photography ==
Because Rainbow Canyon offers the rare opportunity of proximity to military jets in flight, the National Park Service has made it an attraction with informational signs and a parking lot, though training schedules are not available to the public and flights do not occur every day. The closest store and gas station are Panamint Springs Resort at the edge of Panamint Valley. Mobile phone service is not available in the area, and phone-based navigation generally does not work.

== See also ==
- Saline Valley
