= Darwin Falls =

Waterfall in Death Valley, California

Coordinates: 36°19′15″N 117°31′27″W

Darwin Falls is a waterfall located on the western edge of Death Valley National Park near the settlement of Panamint Springs, California. Although there exists a similarly named Darwin Falls Wilderness adjacent to the falls, the falls themselves are located in and administered by Death Valley National Park and the National Park Service. There are several falls, but they are mainly divided into the upper and lower, with a small grotto in between. At a combined 80 feet (24 m), it is the highest waterfall in the park. The canyon is walled by dramatic plutonic rock.

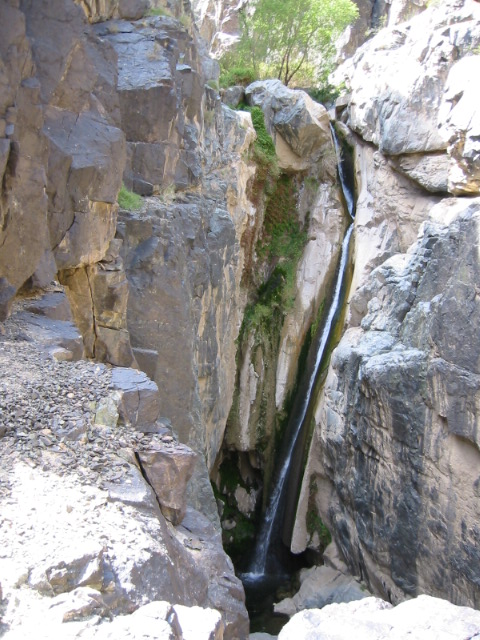
Upper Darwin Falls viewed from the access ledges

Darwin Creek is one of the four perennial streams in three million-acre (12,000 km^{2}) Death Valley National Park. Darwin Falls and Creek are fed by the Darwin Wash, which is in turn fed by the volcanic tableland of the Darwin Bench between the Inyo Mountains and the Argus Range. The small, narrow valley where the creek and falls are located features a rare collection of riparian greenery in the vast desert and is home to indigenous fauna such as quail. The falls themselves support several small fern gullies.

Darwin Falls, the Darwin Falls Wilderness, the nearby town of Darwin, California, and all other areas named "Darwin" in the vicinity are named after Darwin French (1822–1902), a local rancher, miner, and explorer.

== Access ==
Darwin Falls is accessible to the public. The falls are located in a small, narrow valley near Panamint Valley. Access to the trailhead to Darwin Falls was historically Old Toll Road, a dirt road located on the south side of State Route 190, approximately .25 miles (400 m) west of Panamint Springs. However, in 2023, severe flooding from the remnants of Hurricane Hilary washed away much of Old Toll Road, requiring visitors to park along State Route 190 and hike to the trailhead approximately 2.5 miles from the highway. The National Park Service has closed Old Toll Road to all vehicles indefinitely.

The lower falls, which are 20 feet (10 m) tall, are reached with a short hike from the trailhead up Darwin Canyon that is 1 mile (1.6 km) long each way and becomes moderately difficult toward the end. From the start of State Route 190, the entire hike to Darwin Falls is approximately 7 miles round trip with an elevation gain of over 700 feet. The upper falls are viewable with moderate climbing and some exposure.

== A hike to Darwin Falls ==
A photo progression of the approach to the falls

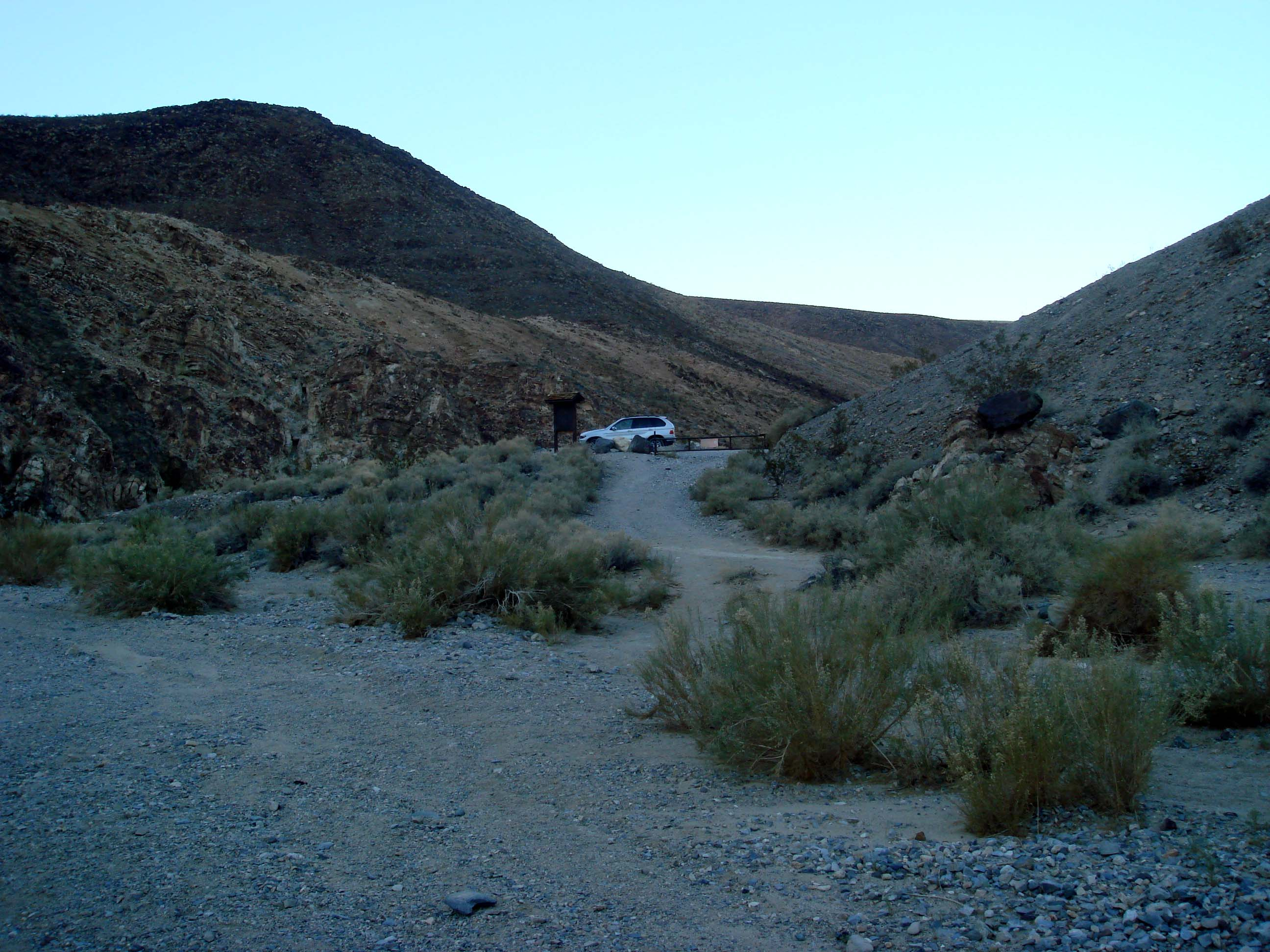
Parking at the main trail head for the canyon pre-2023.

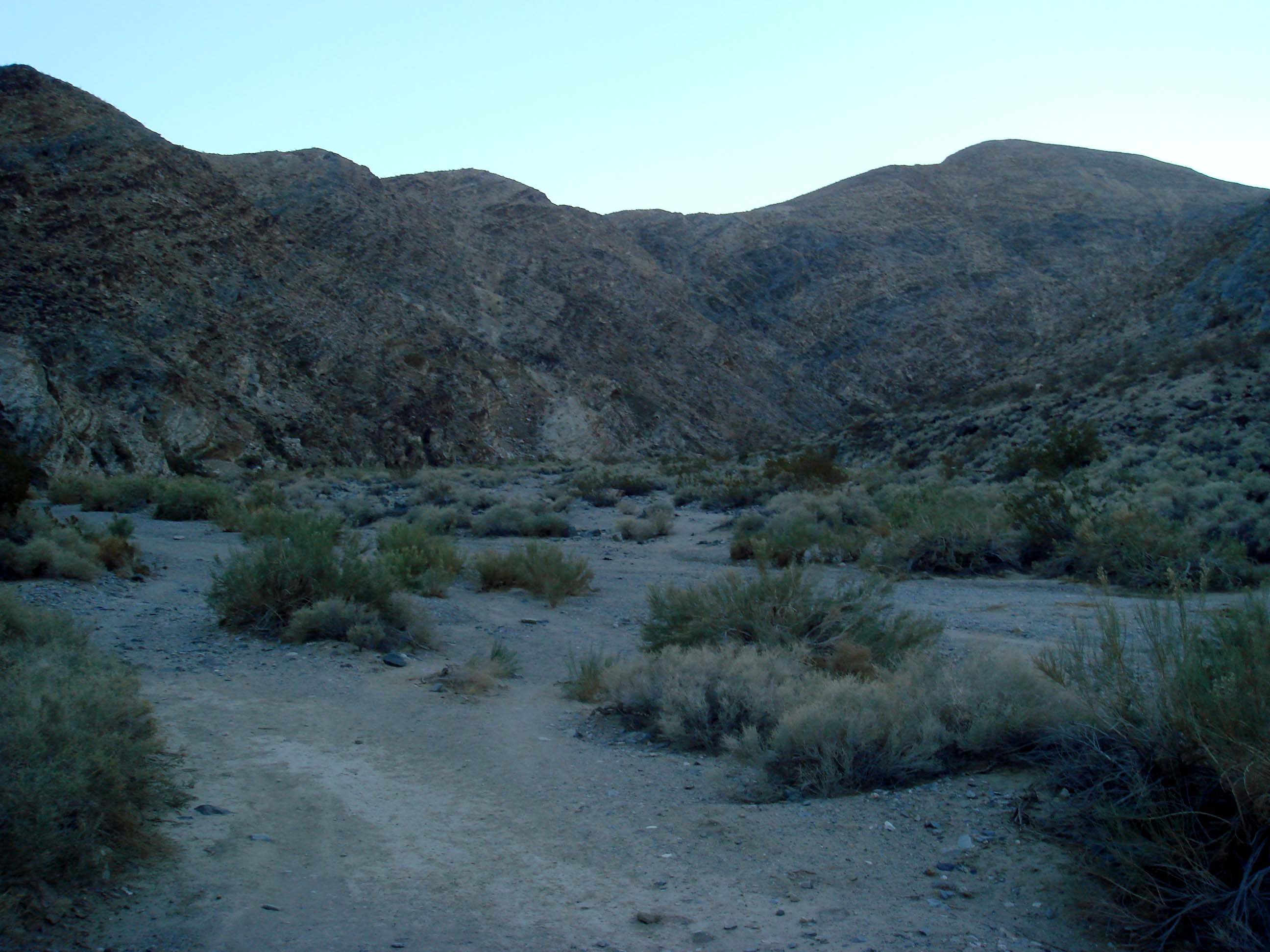
The view of Darwin Canyon from the trail head.

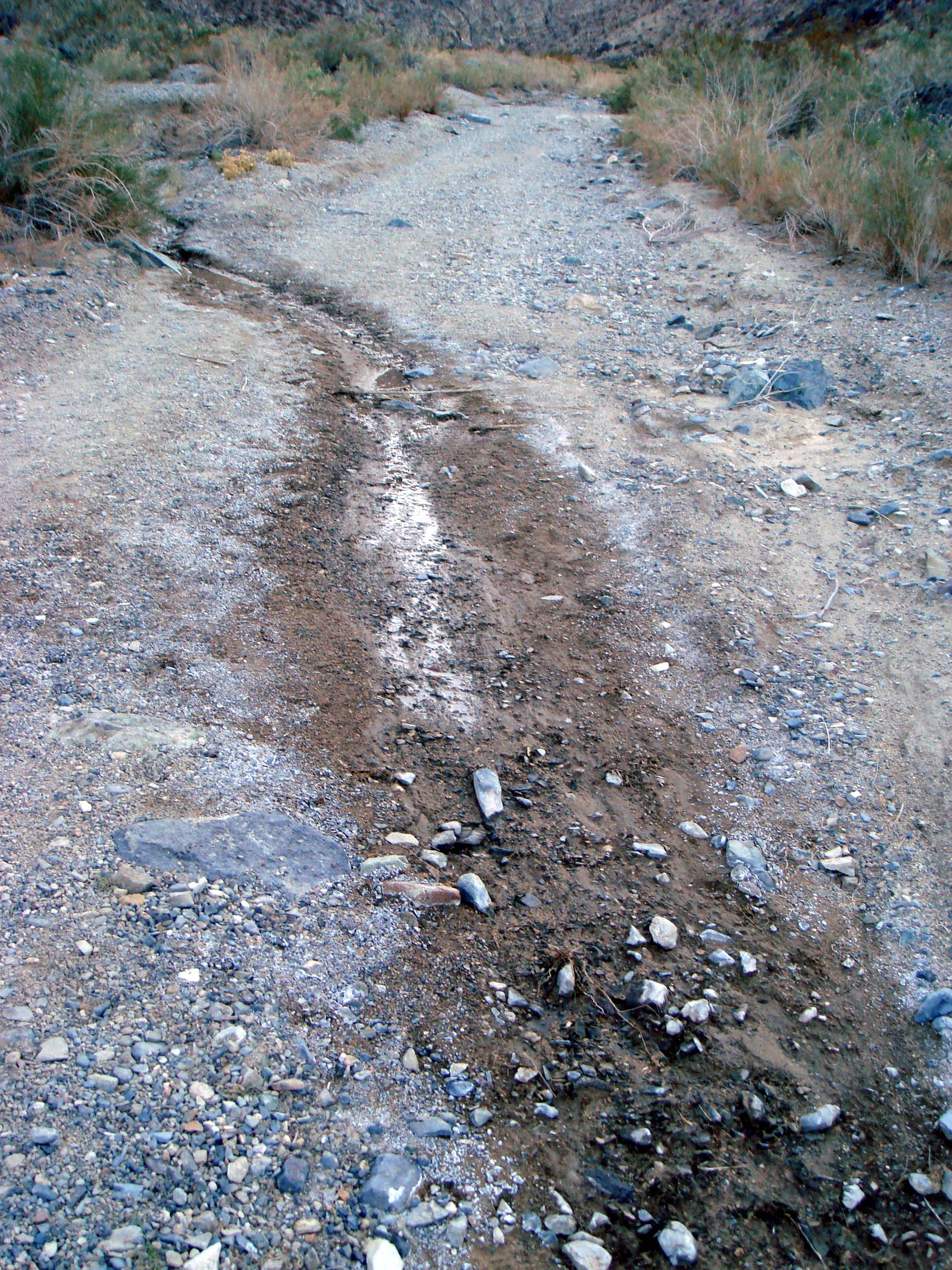
On the approach down Darwin Canyon, the dry soil develops into a moist mud path which begins to reveal water.

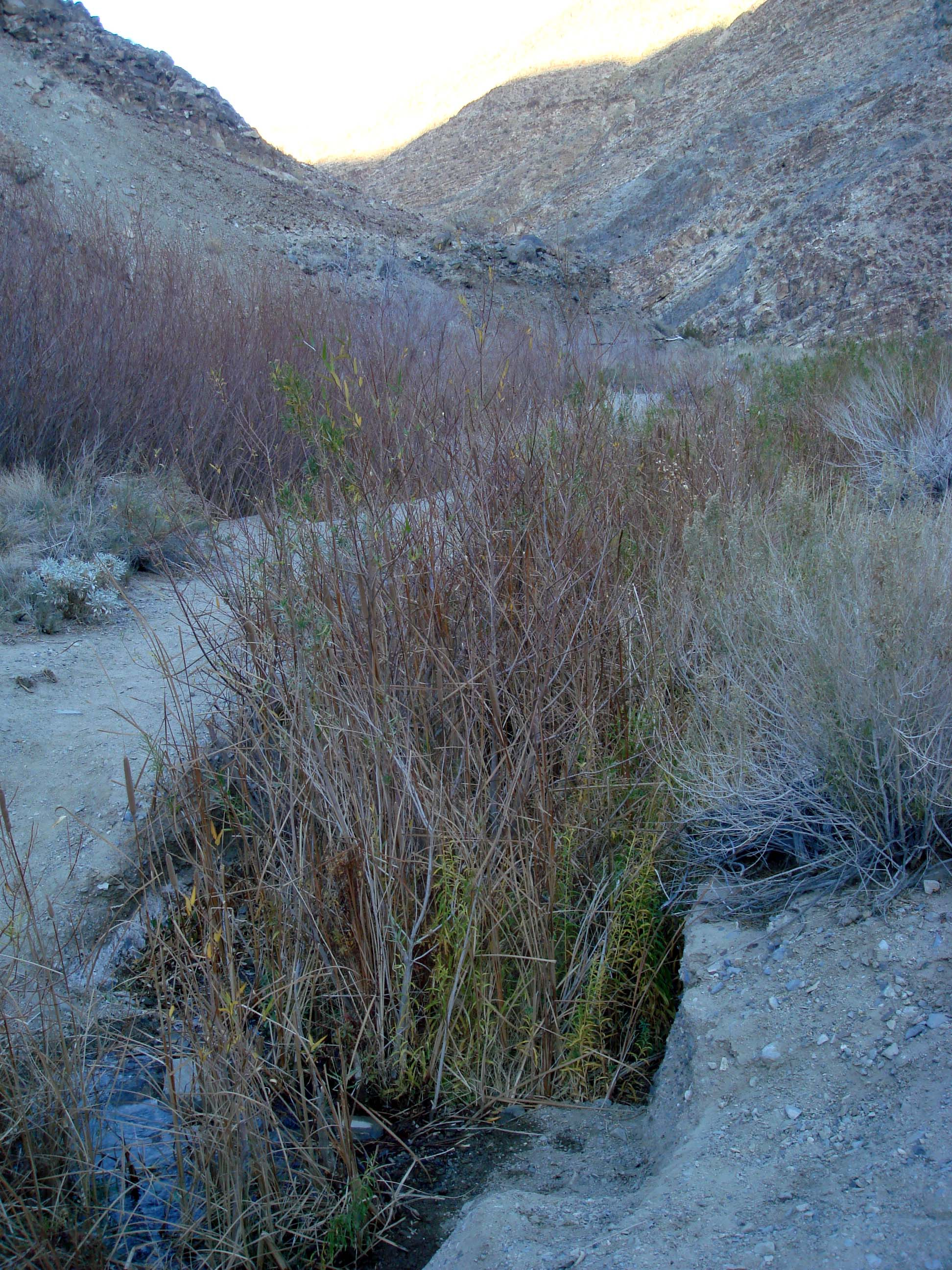
The growing creek begins to host reeds and other riparian vegetation.

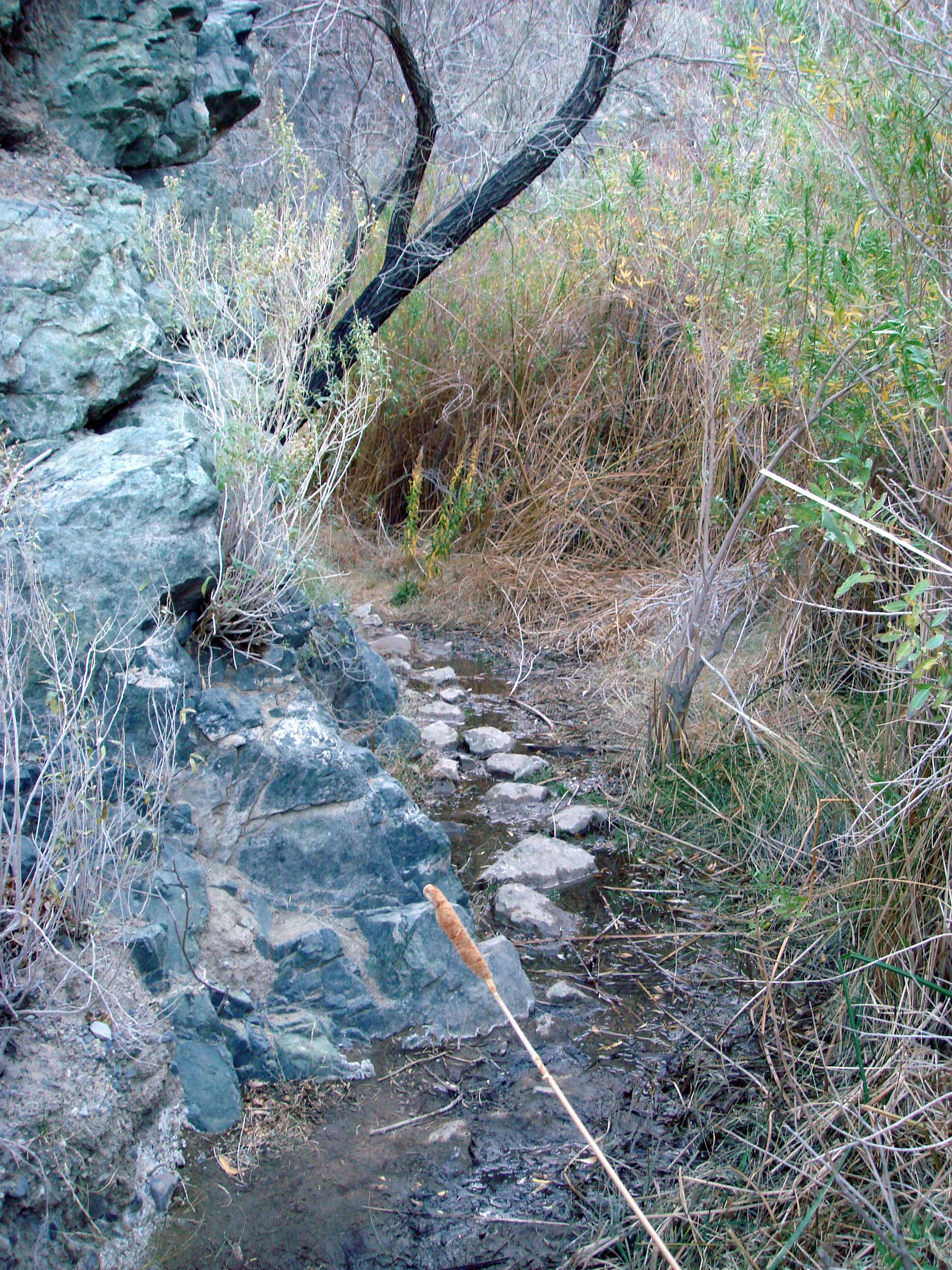
The creek and plutonic rock in Darwin Canyon make the trail tight; the mud can make things slippery.

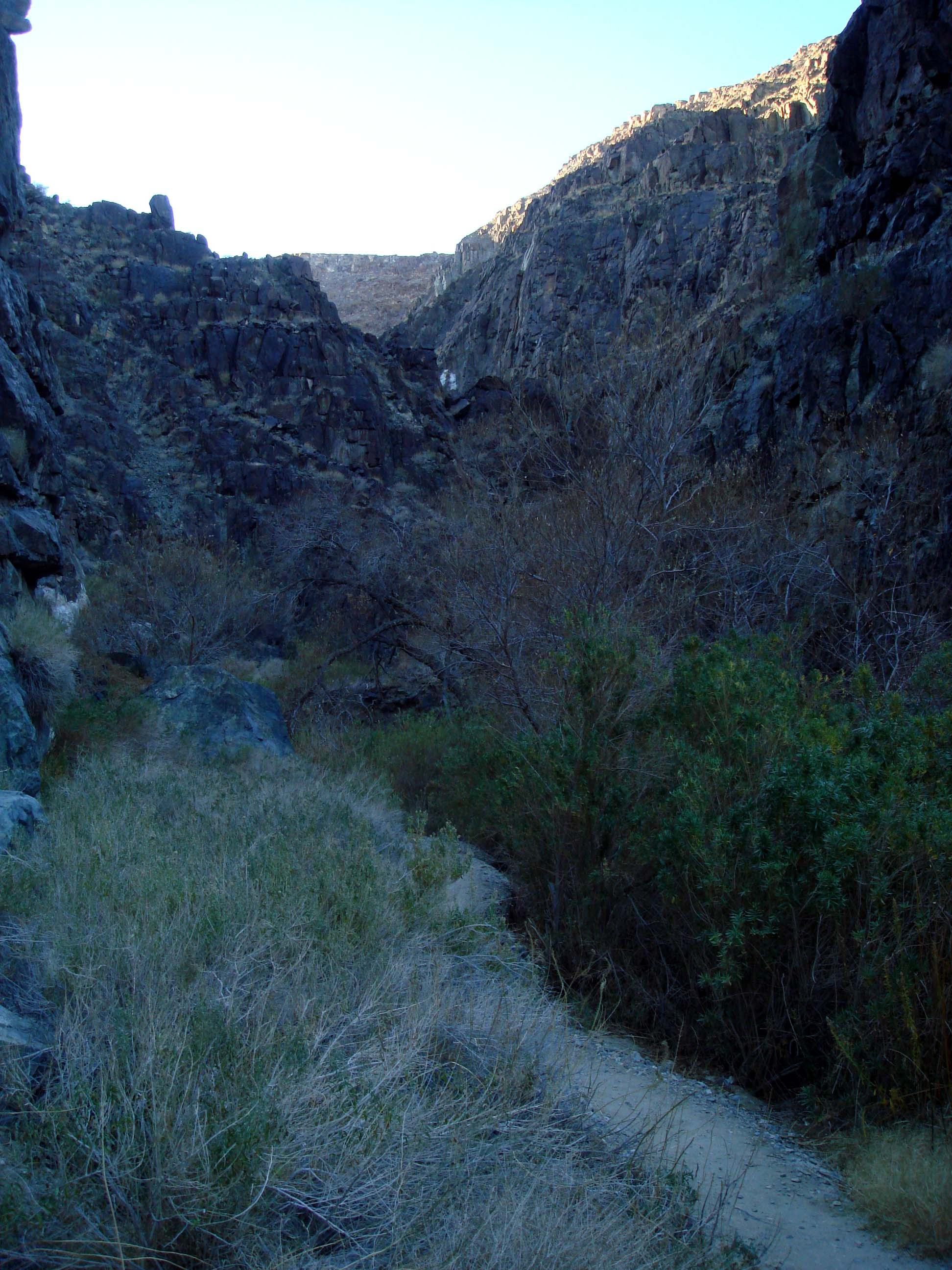
Plutonic rock walls hem in Darwin Canyon and the trail. Trees appear.

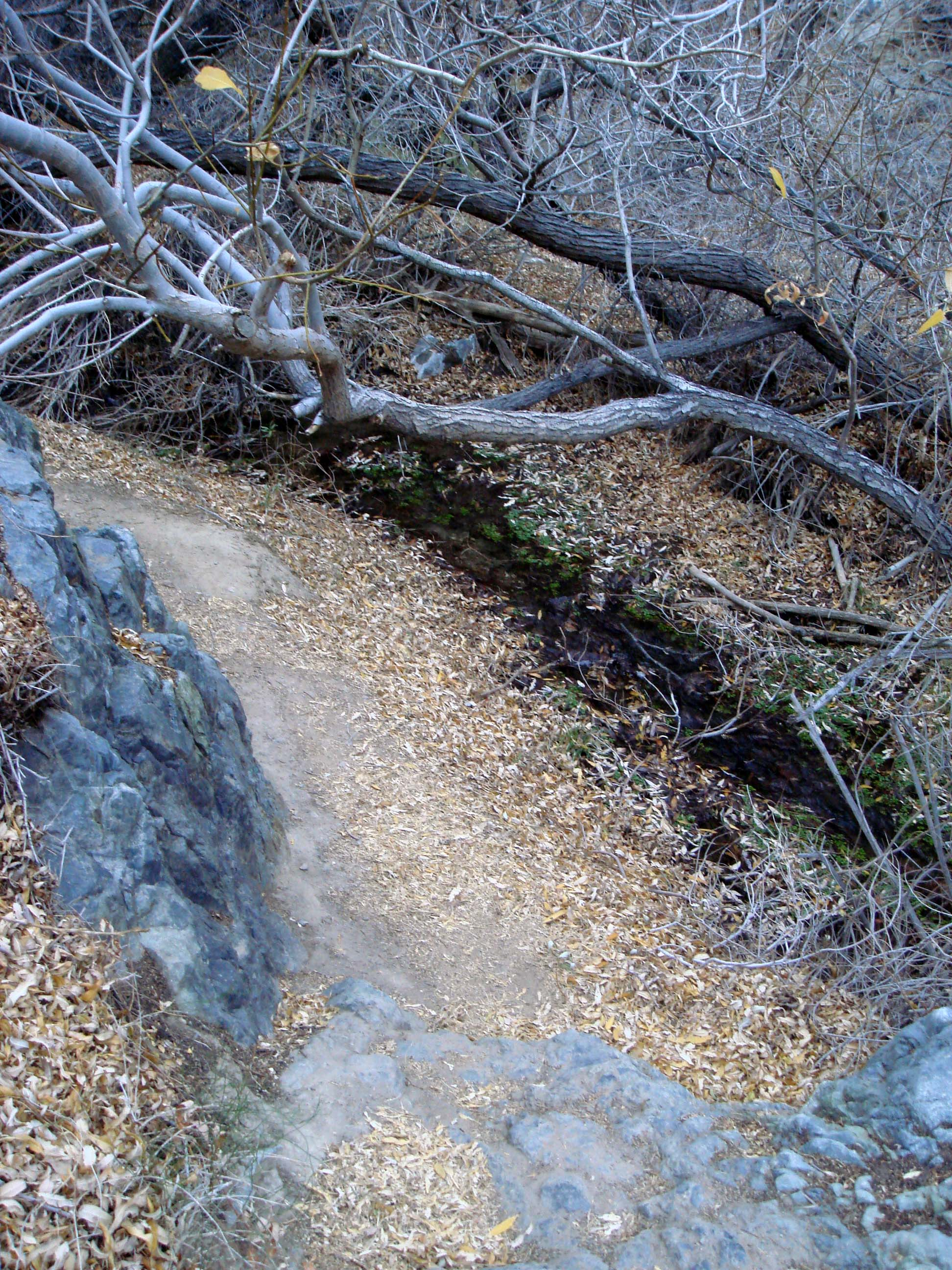
Darwin Creek and surrounding riparian greenery create an oasis, defying their location in Death Valley NP.

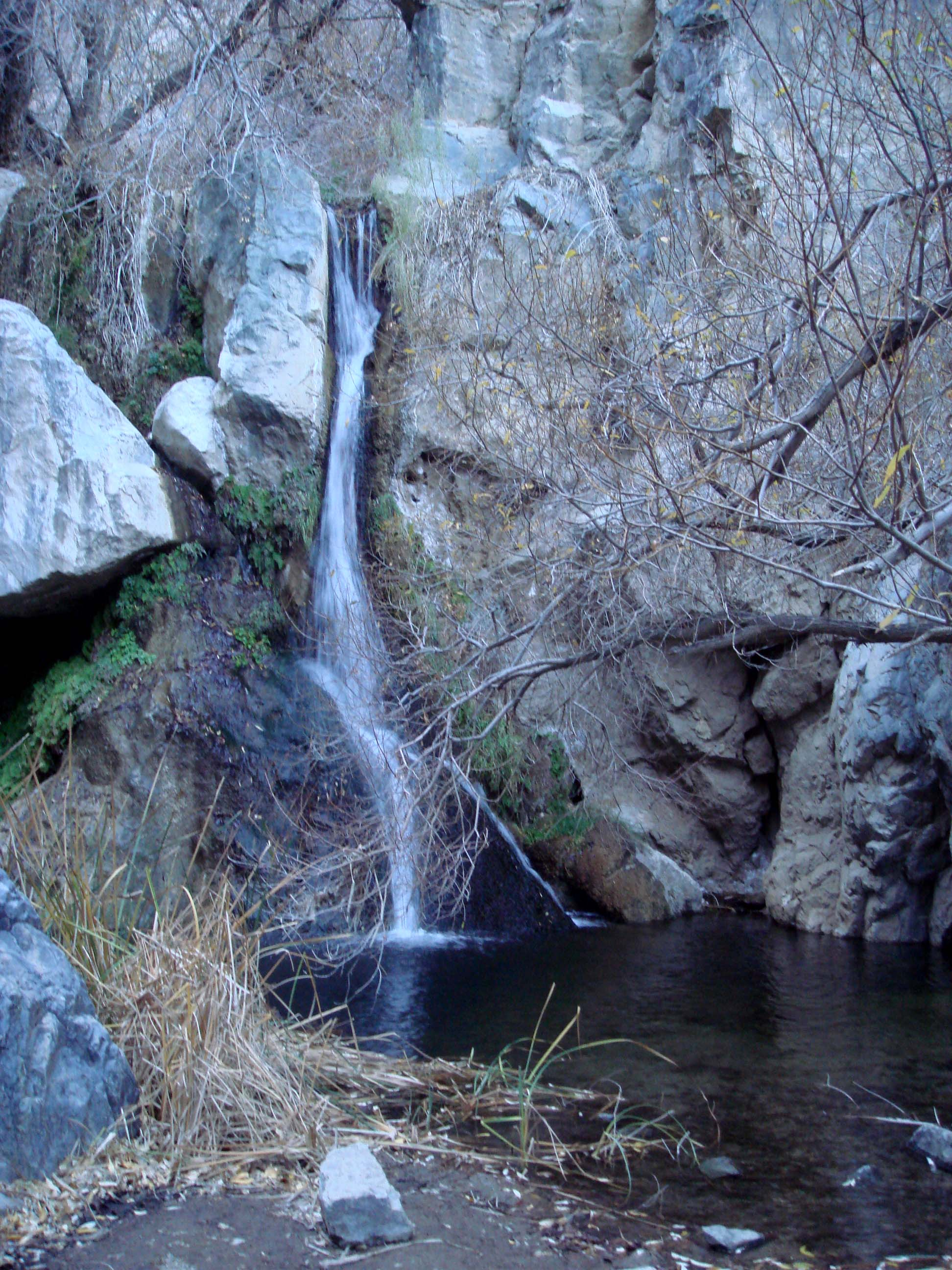
The first glimpse of the lower falls from the trail. Note the ferns.

== See also ==
- List of waterfalls
- List of waterfalls in California
