= Darwin Hills =

Mountain range

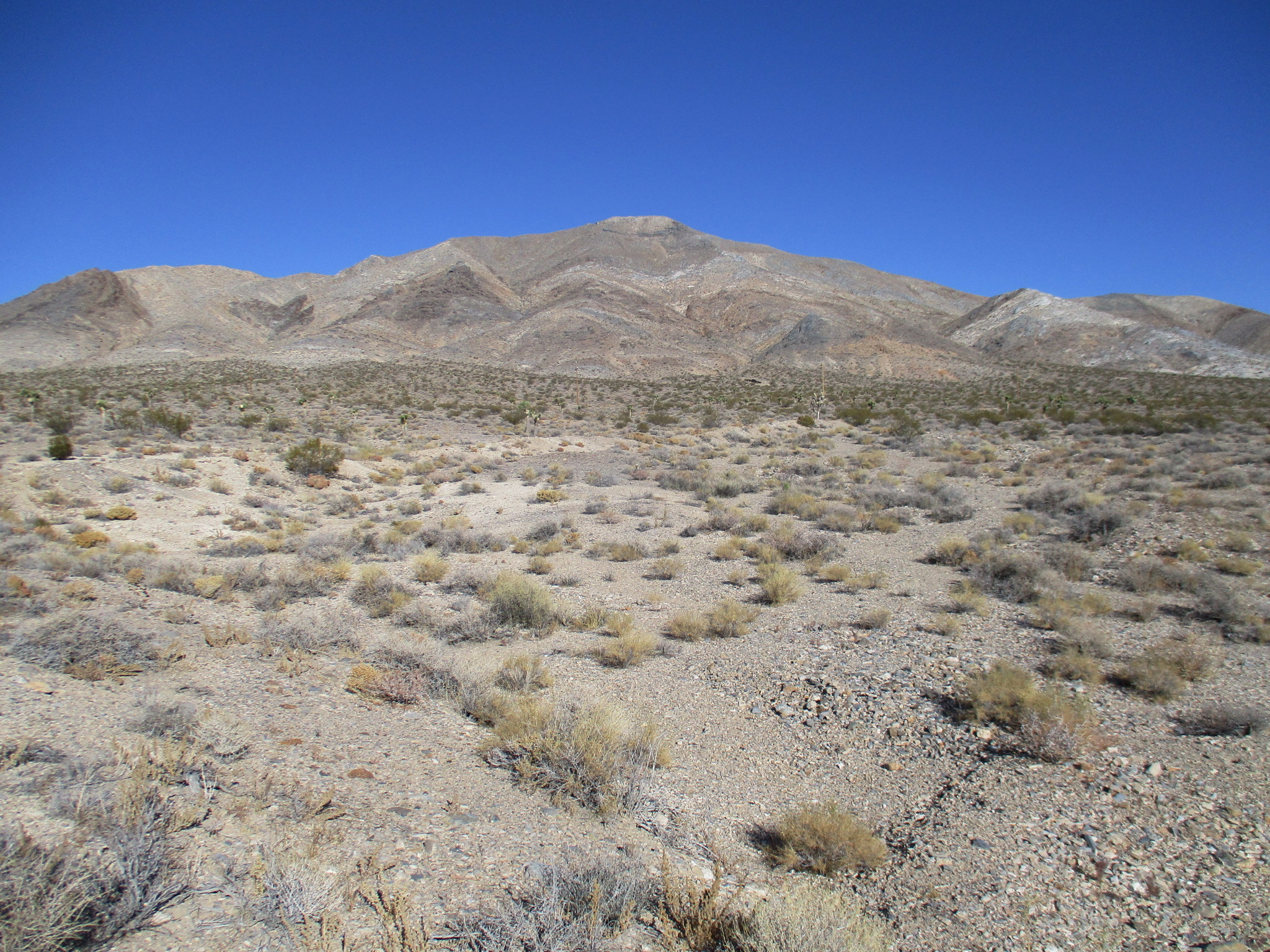
- Ophir Mountain, the highest point in Darwin Hills.

Highest point
- Peak: Ophir Mountain
- Elevation: 1,832 m (6,010 ft)

Geography
- Location within California Location within the United States
- Country: United States
- State: California
- District: Inyo County
- Range coordinates: 36°17′24.787″N 117°35′56.247″W
- Topo map: USGS Darwin

The Darwin Hills are a mountain range in Inyo County, California, situated near the Argus Range, Panamint Range, and Inyo Mountains. Darwin Falls and the Darwin Falls Wilderness are located in the Darwin Hills. They were named after Dr. Darwin French, a local rancher, miner and explorer. At 6,010 feet (1,832 m), the summit of Ophir Mountain is the highest point of Darwin Hills.

== See also ==
- North American desert flora
- Protected areas of the Mojave Desert
