= Argus Range =

Mountain range in Inyo County, California

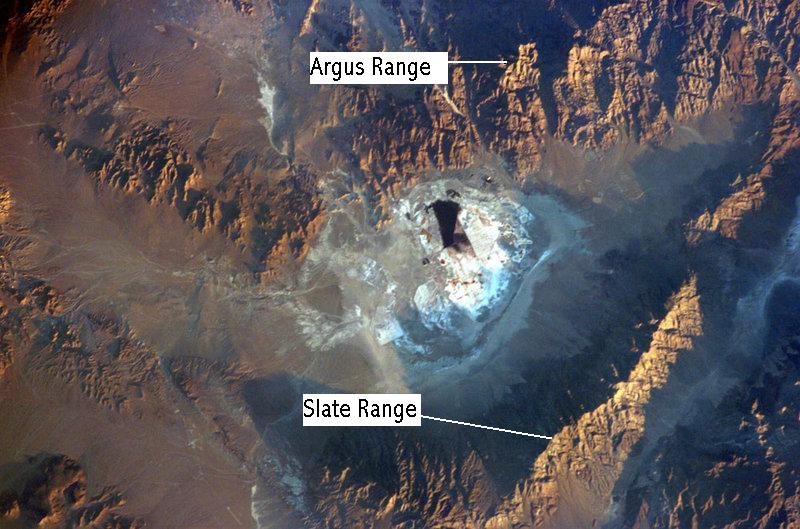
- Argus Range, near Searles Dry Lake, Mojave Desert, California

Highest point
- Peak: Maturango Peak
- Elevation: 8,843 ft (2,695 m)
- Coordinates: 36°07′14″N 117°29′44″W

Geography
- Location within California
- Country: United States
- State: California
- District: Inyo County
- Range coordinates: 36°5′8.804″N 117°28′6.223″W
- Topo map: USGS Maturango Peak

The Argus Range is a mountain range located primarily in Inyo County, California, southeast of the town of Darwin. The range forms the western boundary of Panamint Valley, and the northwestern boundary of Searles Valley. The Coso Range is located to the west, and the Panamint Range to the east.

== Geography ==
The Argus Range is one of the westernmost of the Basin and Range Province ranges. The northern end of the range is just south of the Panamint Springs Resort on Highway 190. The range runs south to Argus Peak, just northwest of Searles Lake, near the town of Trona, California. In addition to Argus Peak, the range contains Maturango Peak. The southernmost end of the range is in San Bernardino County.

The crest of the Argus Range is located within NAWS China Lake and so the peaks of this range are off-limits to the general public. The two peaks that are most alluring to would-be hikers are Argus Peak (6,562 ft or 2,000 m) and Maturango Peak (8,839 ft or 2,694 m) towering to the west of Panamint Valley.

== Argus Range Wilderness ==
The Argus Range Wilderness, under the administration of the Bureau of Land Management (BLM), runs 28 miles (45 km) along the east side of the Argus Range. It extends from the military reservation on the west to the foot of the Argus Range on the east. For most of its length, this wilderness area is no more than two miles (3 km) wide. Several private property holdings are located within this wilderness area including a rather deep cherry-stem at Snow Canyon and a 40-acre (16 ha) parcel known as Onyx Springs between Shepherd and Bendire Canyons. Many land-owners were affected by the creation of the Argus Range Wilderness Area in 1994 .
