= Panamint Springs =

Resort in California

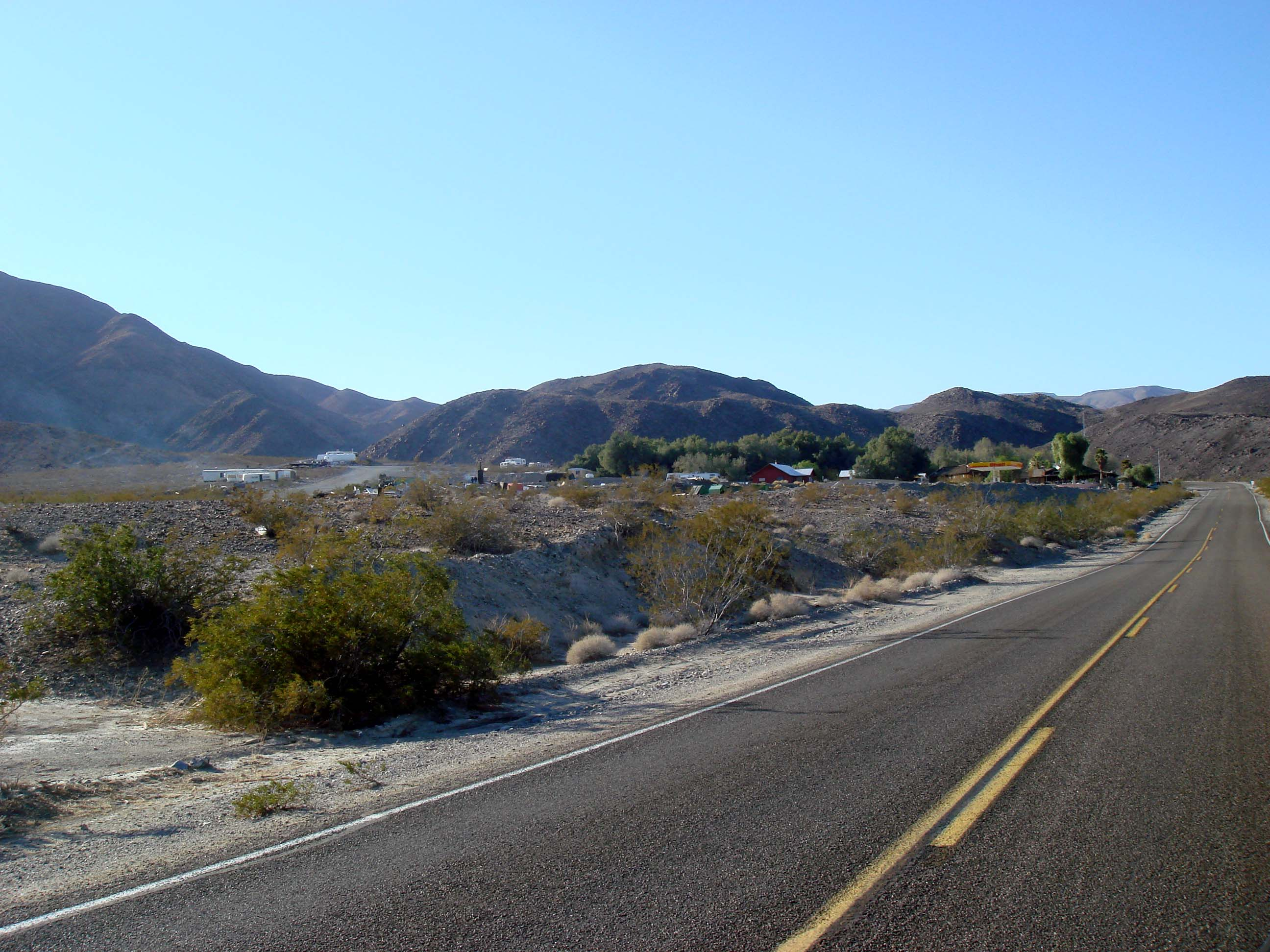
Panamint Springs Resort, sitting on the western edge of Panamint Valley

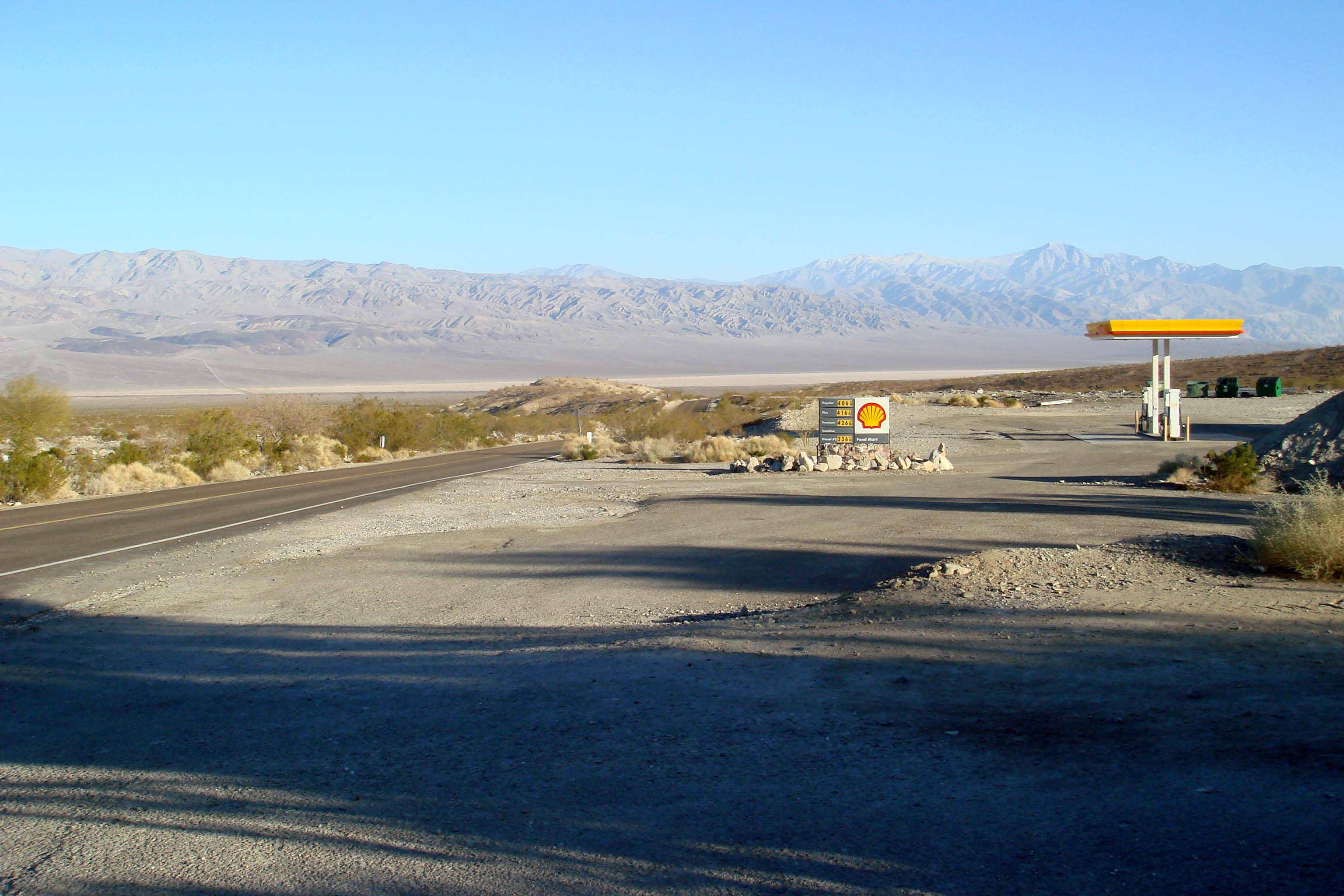
Panamint Valley and Panamint Springs gas station

Panamint Springs is private resort in Inyo County, California, United States. It consists of a motel, cabins, RV and tent campsites, restaurant, and gas station, all operated by Cassell Enterprises, LLC. It lies at an elevation of 1926 feet (587 m).

== Location ==
Panamint Springs Resort is located along State Route 190 (SR190) between Old Toll Road and Panamint Valley Road. The closest store and gas station to Star Wars Canyon, the site features a motel, campground, restaurant, and the last gas station for many miles in either direction on SR190.

Although not official per the Board of Geographic Names, Caltrans calls the SR190/Panamint Valley Road intersection 2.5 driving miles east of Panamint Springs Panamint Junction. Towne Pass, a landmark when traveling to Death Valley, is 13.9 driving miles east on SR190. Beyond the pass, SR190 descends approximately 5,000 feet (1,500 m) to the dry bed of Lake Manly.

The Darwin Falls Wilderness, a U.S. Wilderness Area, is located just west of the resort. The nearby area also features the Darwin Falls, a small but scenic waterfall, grotto and creek that are the only year-round water supply in the driest part of North America; despite the similarly named wilderness, the falls are located in and administered by Death Valley National Park. The dirt road entryway to the trail to Darwin Falls is located one-quarter mile west of the resort.

== History ==
Panamint Springs Resort was originally owned and operated by Buffalo Bill Cody’s cousin, Agnes Cody and her husband W.A. Reid. The motel was opened in 1937 when the first toll road was constructed traversing the Panamint Valley. A post office operated at Panamint Springs from 1940 to 1946, but it no longer receives mail at all. Ownership transferred to Peter and Elizabeth Clarkson in 1958 in a motel exchange with Agnes Reid. In 1986 the managers found it too expensive to install telephone lines to the remote resort. It has been owned by the Cassell Family since 2006.

From 1989 to 1998 Panamint Springs Resort operated the Panamint Springs Airport at 36.338°N 117.468°W, just south of California State Route 190. Panamint Springs Airport had a single unpaved northeast/southwest runway. While not operated as an airport, the runway was still used for landing.

From 1942 to 1945 the US Army operated the Panamint Spring Auxiliary Airfield at 36.37°N 117.418°W, 2 miles north of Route 190 on a dry lake bed. The runway was used for the training of World War II pilots. After the war, the runway was abandoned and no trace can be found today.
