= Darwin Falls Wilderness =

Protected wilderness area in California, United States

- IUCN category Ib (wilderness area)
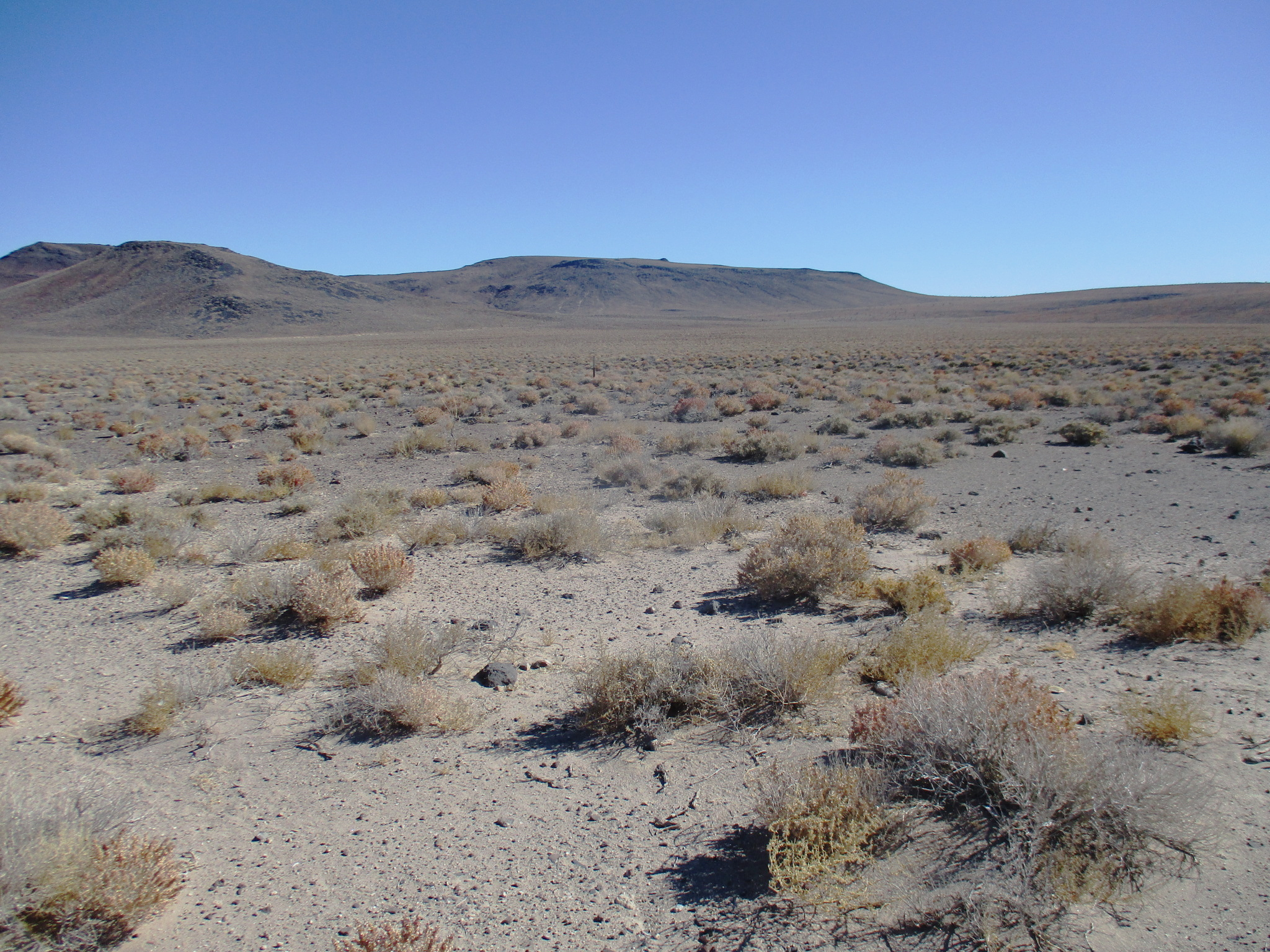
- Darwin Falls Wilderness viewed from California State Route 190

- Location within California Location within the United States
- Interactive map of Darwin Falls Wilderness
- Location: Inyo County, California, United States
- Nearest city: Darwin, CA
- Coordinates: 36°20′36″N 117°35′59″W
- Area: 8,190 acres (3,310 ha)
- Established: October 31, 1994
- Governing body: Bureau of Land Management

The Darwin Falls Wilderness is a protected area in the northern Mojave Desert adjacent to Death Valley National Park. The 8,189-acre (3,314 ha) wilderness area was created by the California Desert Protection Act of 1994 and is managed by the Bureau of Land Management as part of the National Wilderness Preservation System.

The wilderness includes portions of the Darwin Plateau and the Darwin Hills. Much of the higher elevations are Tertiary volcanic rocks while the lower elevations to the southeast in Darwin Canyon are dominated by Permian marine sedimentary and metasedimentary rock. Though the wilderness is traditionally considered to be within the northern Mojave Desert, some classifications acknowledge floristic affinities with the colder deserts to the north and consider this the Southeastern Great Basin Ecoregion. A desert scrub community is common in the wilderness with Joshua tree woodlands at higher elevations.

The high point of the Darwin Falls Wilderness is at an elevation of 5,699 feet (1,737 m) in the Darwin Hills. The lowest elevation is in Darwin Canyon at 3,129 feet (954 m).

== Darwin Falls ==
Darwin Falls, for which the wilderness is named, is actually located outside the wilderness in the adjacent Death Valley National Park. The lowest region of the wilderness area is to the east in Darwin Canyon, which then descends into Death Valley National Park where the spring-fed falls are located less than 1 mile (1.6 km) from the wilderness boundary. Darwin Falls is in a narrow, shaded gorge where perennial flow and pools allow for a riparian habitat uncommon in the Mojave Desert.

The falls are most easily accessed from the east through Death Valley National Park and not through the more remote and difficult terrain of the Darwin Falls Wilderness.

Darwin Falls, the Darwin Falls Wilderness, and all other areas named "Darwin" in the vicinity are named after Darwin French (1822–1902), a local rancher, miner, and explorer.

== Access ==
The nearest settlement is the community of Darwin. Access to this wilderness is via State Route 190 through Panamint Valley approximately 30 miles east of Olancha and along the road into Darwin or down the Darwin Canyon Road.

== See also ==
- Darwin Falls
- Protected areas of the Mojave Desert
- North American desert flora
