= Darwin (2011 film) =

- Promotional film poster
- Directed by: Nick Brandestini
- Written by: Taylor Segrest
- Produced by: Nick Brandestini; Sandra Ruch; Taylor Segrest; Vesna Brandestini
- Cinematography: Nick Brandestini
- Music by: Michael Brook
- Release dates: July 3, 2011 (Karlovy Vary Int'l Film Festival); August 12, 2011 (United States)
- Running time: 88 minutes
- Country: Switzerland
- Language: English

Darwin is a 2011 documentary film directed by Nick Brandestini. It is a portrait of the small and remote community of Darwin, located in California's Mojave Desert. The community is part of Inyo County, California. The film was released to good reviews at film festivals throughout the world and also had a limited theatrical release in the United States.

== Release ==
The film premiered at the 2011 Santa Barbara International Film Festival. It went on to play at numerous American and Canadian film festivals. The European premiere of Darwin took place at the Karlovy Vary International Film Festival, a "category A" film festival, according to the FIAPF organization.

In August 2011, the film had a limited theatrical run in New York City and Los Angeles as part of the 15th Annual DocuWeeks Theatrical Documentary Showcase.

== Critical reaction ==
Darwin received positive reviews from critics. Kevin Thomas of the Los Angeles Times gave the film 5 out of 5 stars and called it "a beautiful, elegiac work with unexpected impact and meaning." Jeannette Catsoulis of The New York Times also praised the film, calling it "a droll and dusty portrait of a place where privacy is prized and boundaries respected." The film was also well received at the BFI London Film Festival where it was a Time Out London critics' choice.

As of October 2021, Darwin holds an 80% rating on the film review site Rotten Tomatoes.

Darwin won several awards at international film festivals, among others the "Best documentary award" at the Austin Film Festival, the "Best German language documentary" award at the Zurich Film Festival, the "Festival favorite award" at the Sonoma International Film Festival, and a "Special jury mention award" at the DocAviv Film Festival.
