= Panamint Range =

Mountain range in Death Valley, California, U.S.

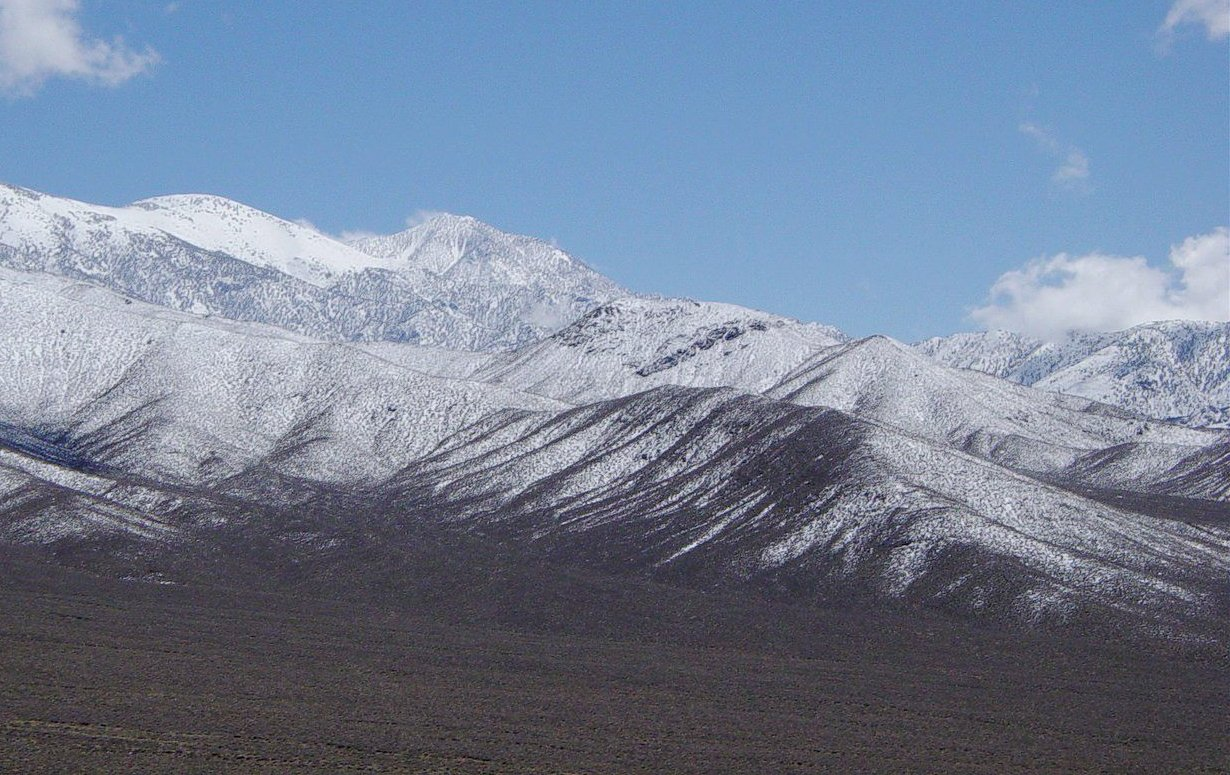
- Panamint Range looking toward Telescope Peak

Highest point
- Peak: Telescope Peak
- Elevation: 11,043 ft (3,366 m) NAVD 88
- Coordinates: 36°10′11″N 117°05′21″W

Geography
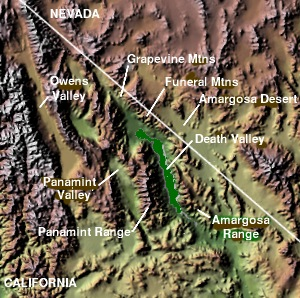
- Map of Death Valley region
- Country: United States
- State: California
- District: Inyo County
- Range coordinates: 36°10′11.8″N 117°5′21.2″W
- Topo map: USGS Telescope Peak

The Panamint Range is a short rugged fault-block mountain range in the northern Mojave Desert, within Death Valley National Park in Inyo County, eastern California. A small part of the southern end of the range is in San Bernardino County. Dr. Darwin French is credited as applying the term Panamint in 1860 during his search for the fabled Gunsight Lode.

The origin of the name is the Paiute or Koso word Panümünt or Pa (water) and nïwïnsti (person).

== Geography ==
The range runs north–south for approximately 100 miles (160 km) through Inyo County, forming the western wall of Death Valley and separating it from the Panamint Valley to the west. The range is part of the Basin and Range Province, at the western end of the Great Basin.

The highest peak in the range is Telescope Peak, with an elevation of 11,043 feet (3,366 m).

== Features ==
Both Mount Whitney above the Owens Valley and Badwater Basin in Death Valley are visible from certain vantage points in the Panamint Range, making it one of few places where one can simultaneously see both the highest and lowest points in the contiguous United States. Dante's View east of Death Valley is another.

Being a sky island habitat of the Mojave Desert, with more precipitation and temperature variation than the desert floor and hills, there are various plant and animal species endemic to the Panamint Range.

=== Mining ===
The Panamint Mining District is on the western side of the Panamint Range. Panamint City (est. 1873) was a mining town in the district, formerly in the central section of the range. The historic mining community of Ballarat (est. 1890s), also in the district, is now a ghost town. The Gold Hill Mining District (est. 1875) was in the southwestern section of the range, at the northeast end of Butte Valley.

The Wildrose Charcoal Kilns (completed 1877) are ruins of charcoal kilns located near Wildrose Canyon in the northern range and within Death Valley National Park. They were built in 1877 by the Modock Consolidated Mining Company, to provide fuel for smelters near their lead and silver mines in the Argus Range. The ten beehive shaped masonry structures, about 25 feet (7.6 m) tall, are the best known surviving examples of such charcoal kilns in the western U.S.

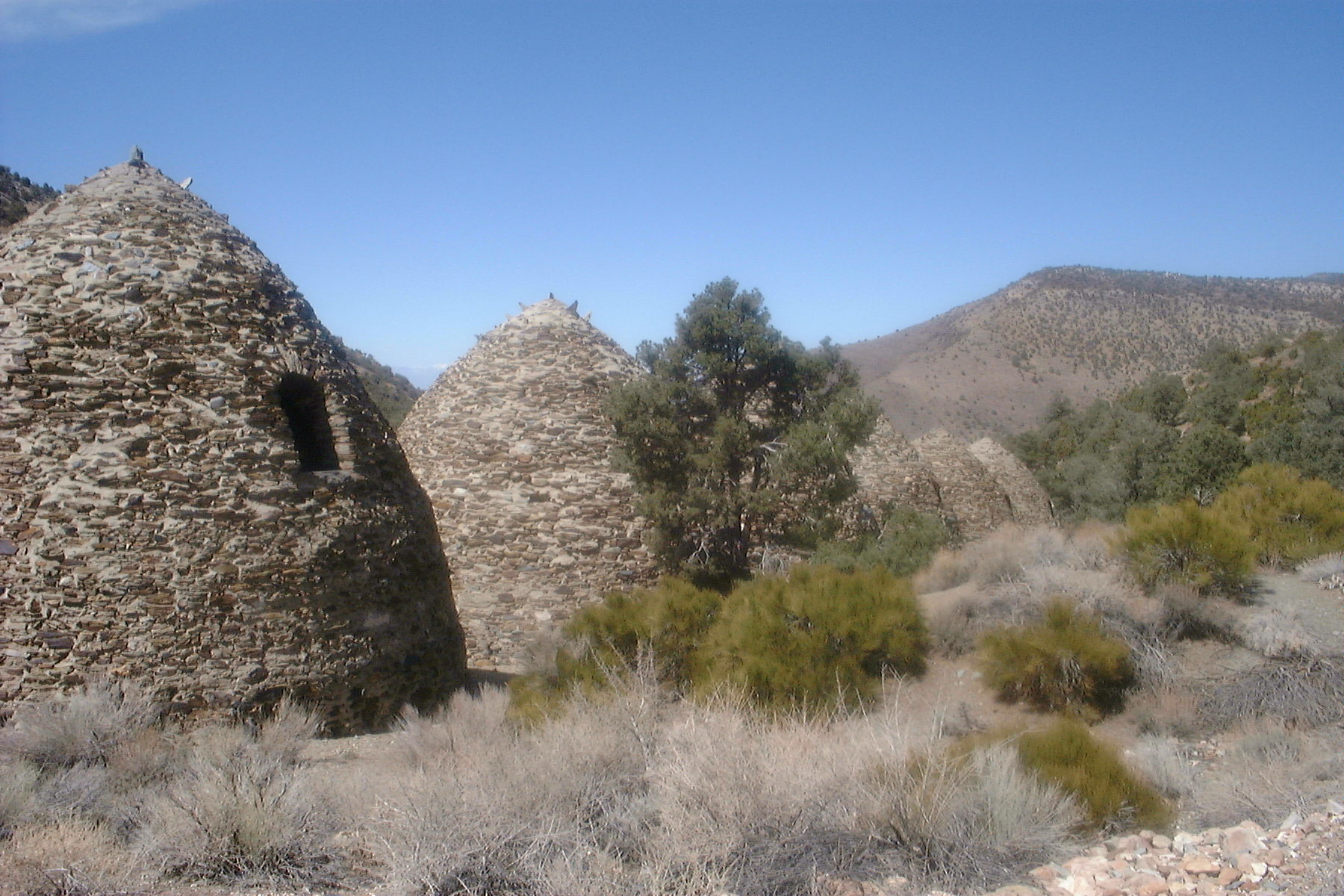
Wildrose charcoal kilns

== See also ==
- Panamint Range topics
