= Darwin, California =

- Unincorporated Community; Census Designated Place
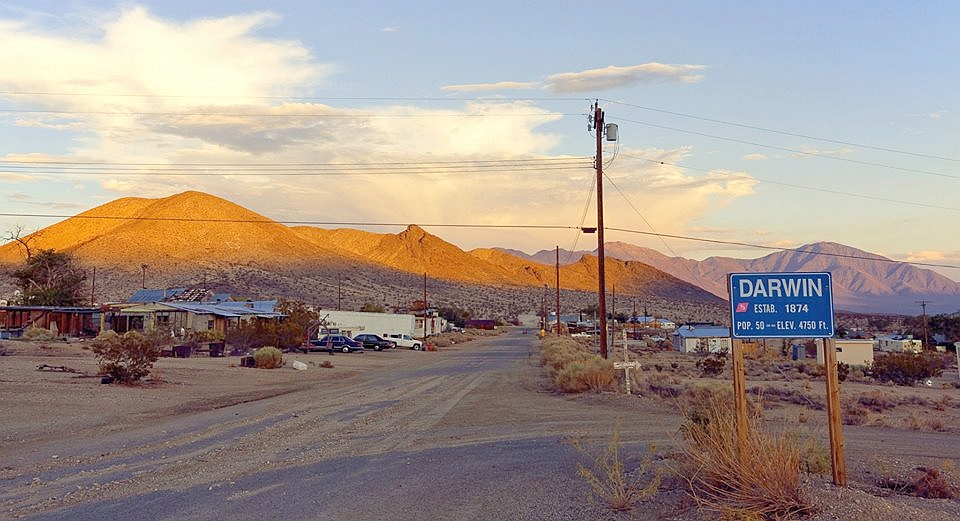
- Darwin, California

- Location in Inyo County and the state of California

- Location in the United States
- Coordinates: 36°16′08″N 117°35′20″W
- Country: United States
- State: California
- County: Inyo

Area
  - Total: 1.34 sq mi (3.48 km^{2})
  - Land: 1.34 sq mi (3.48 km^{2})
  - Water: 0 sq mi (0.00 km^{2}) 0%
- Elevation: 4,846 ft (1,477 m)

Population (2020)
  - Total: 36
  - Density: 26.8/sq mi (10.33/km^{2})
- Time zone: UTC-8 (Pacific (PST))
  - Summer (DST): UTC-7 (PDT)
- ZIP code: 93522
- Area codes: 442/760
- FIPS code: 06-18030
- GNIS feature ID: 2408642

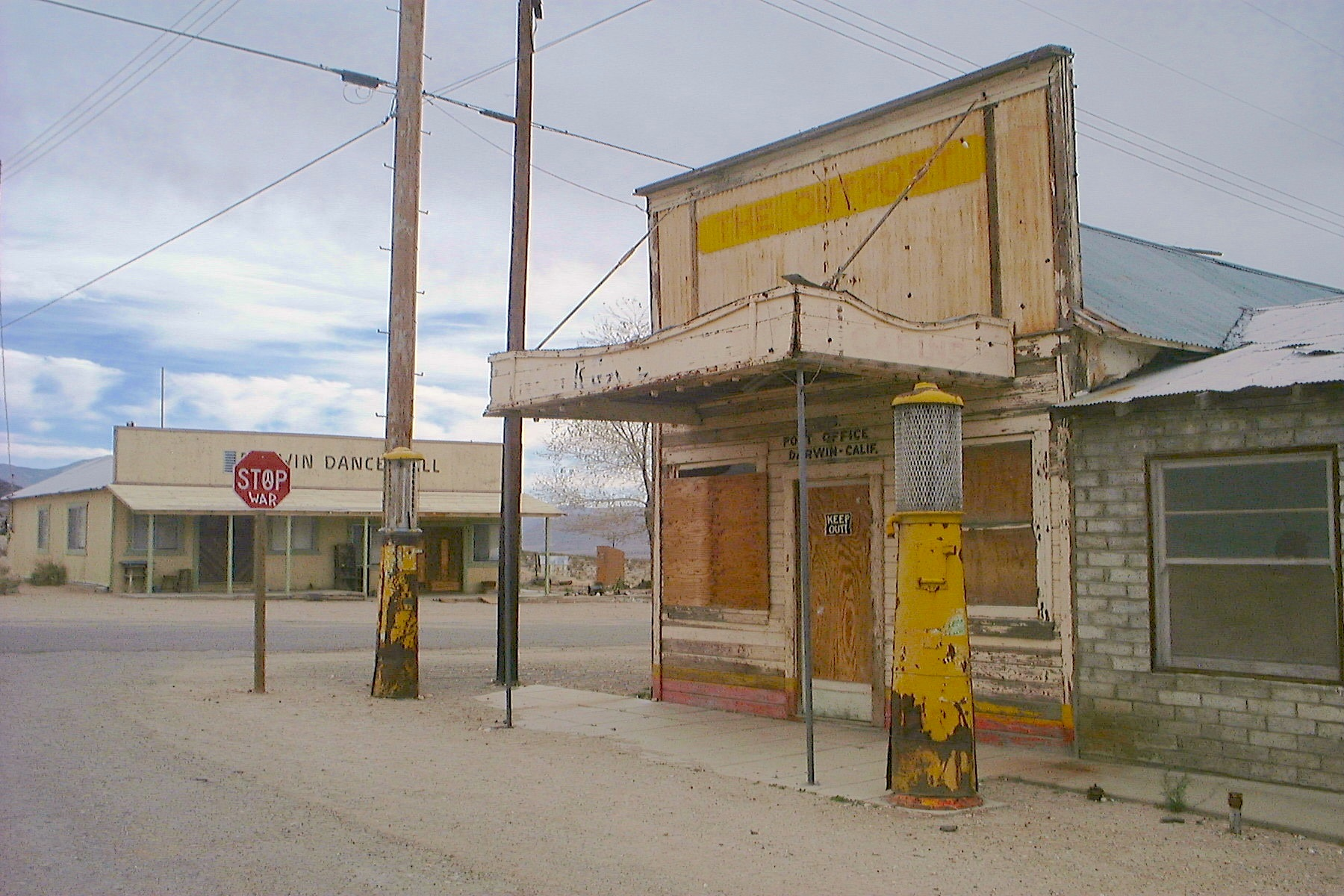
Downtown Darwin in 2003

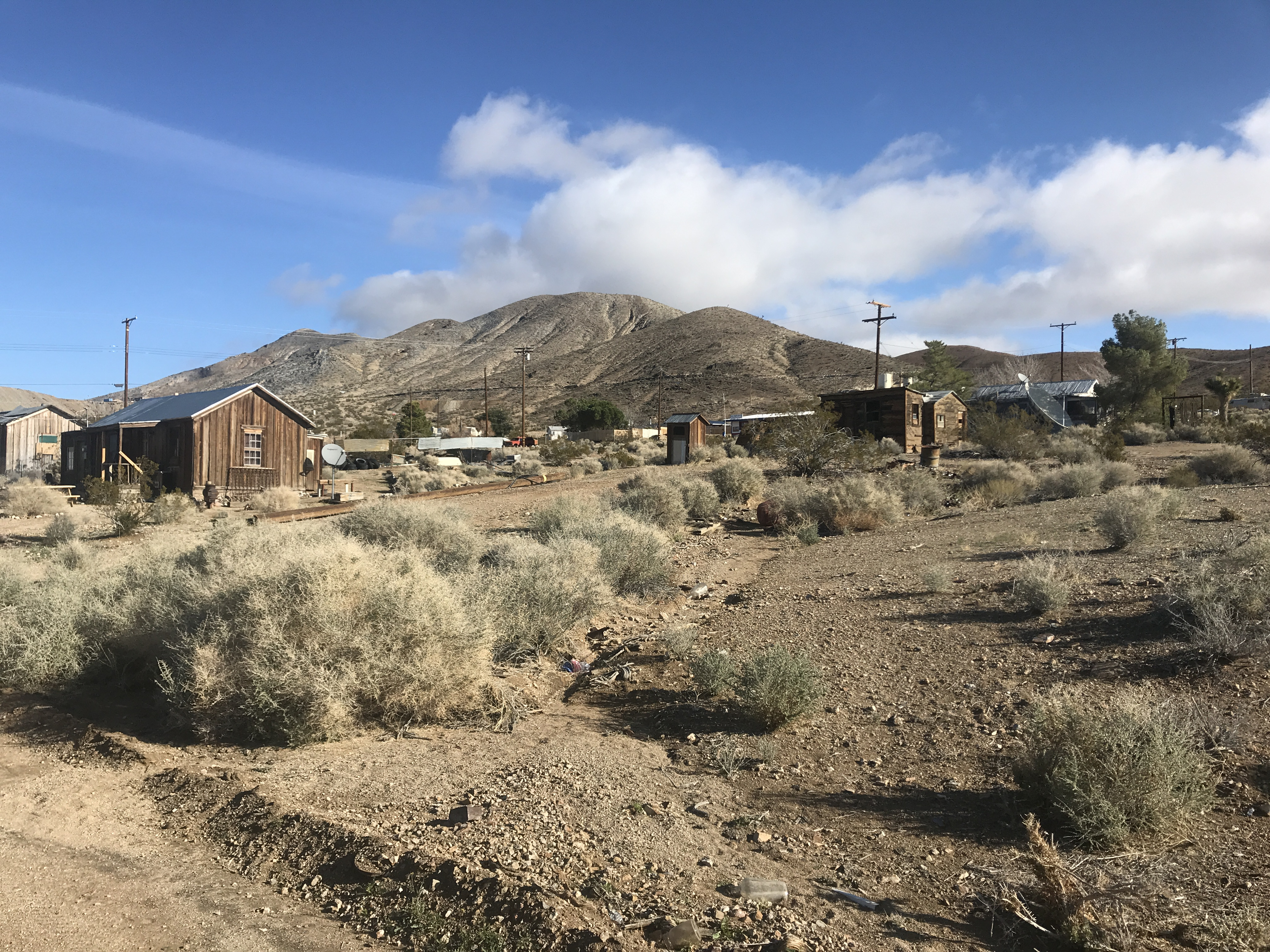
Darwin in 2020

Darwin is an unincorporated former mining community in Inyo County, California, United States. It is located 22 miles (35 km) southeast of Keeler. For statistical purposes, the United States Census Bureau has defined Darwin as a census-designated place (CDP). The population was 36 at the 2020 census, down from 43 at the 2010 census.

== History ==
The town is named after Darwin French (1822–1902), a local rancher, miner, and explorer.

According to Erwin Gudde, French of Fort Tejon was with a party of prospectors in the area during the fall of 1850. French also led a party into Death Valley in 1860 to search for the mythical Gunsight Lode via the local wash, lending his first name to the wash, canyon, and future town.

Silver and lead discovery at the place led to the founding of a settlement in 1874. A post office opened in 1875, closed for a time in 1902, and remains open. The town prospered when Eichbaum Toll Road opened in 1926, opening Death Valley from the west. When Death Valley became a National Monument in 1933, it was decided to buy the toll road to allow free access to the new park. In 1937, a new cutoff bypassed Darwin, isolating the town.

The town was the subject of a 2011 documentary film Darwin. In April 2012, BBC News featured a video of local residents describing their wishes to replace dial-up Internet access with broadband.

== Geography ==
According to the United States Census Bureau, the CDP has a total area of 1.3 square miles (3.4 km^{2}), all land. The census definition of the area was created by the Census Bureau for statistical purposes and may not precisely correspond to local understanding of the area with the same name.

== Demographics ==
Historical population
Census	Pop.	Note	%±
2000	54		—
2010	43		−20.4%
2020	36		−16.3%
U.S. Decennial Census; 1860–1870 1880-1890; 1900 1910 1920; 1930 1940 1950; 1960 1970 1980; 1990 2000 2010; 2020

Darwin first appeared as a census designated place in the 2000 U.S. census.

=== Racial and ethnic composition ===
Darwin CDP, California – Racial and ethnic composition Note: the US Census treats Hispanic/Latino as an ethnic category. This table excludes Latinos from the racial categories and assigns them to a separate category. Hispanics/Latinos may be of any race.
Race / Ethnicity (NH = Non-Hispanic)	Pop 2000	Pop 2010	Pop 2020	% 2000	% 2010	% 2020
White alone (NH)	48	36	34	88.89%	83.72%	94.44%
Black or African American alone (NH)	0	0	0	0.00%	0.00%	0.00%
Native American or Alaska Native alone (NH)	2	2	2	3.70%	4.65%	5.56%
Asian alone (NH)	0	1	0	0.00%	2.33%	0.00%
Native Hawaiian or Pacific Islander alone (NH)	0	1	0	0.00%	2.33%	0.00%
Other race alone (NH)	0	0	0	0.00%	0.00%	0.00%
Mixed race or Multiracial (NH)	1	1	0	1.85%	2.33%	0.00%
Hispanic or Latino (any race)	3	2	0	5.56%	4.65%	0.00%
Total	54	43	36	100.00%	100.00%	100.00%

=== 2020 census ===
The 2020 United States census reported that Darwin had a population of 36. The population density was 26.8 inhabitants per square mile (10.3/km^{2}). The racial makeup of Darwin was 34 (94%) non-Hispanic white and 2 (6%) Native American.

The whole population lived in households. There were 24 households, out of which 4 (17%) had children under the age of 18 living in them, 8 (33%) were married-couple households, 6 (25%) had a female householder with no partner present, and 10 (42%) had a male householder with no partner present. 11 households (45.8%) were one person, and 6 (25.0%) were one person aged 65 or older. The average household size was 1.5. There were 10 families (41.7% of all households).

The age distribution was 0 people (0%) under the age of 18, 1 person (3%) aged 18 to 24, 6 people (17%) aged 25 to 44, 18 people (50%) aged 45 to 64, and 11 people (31%) who were 65 years of age or older. The median age was 61.5 years. There were 25 males and 11 females.

There were 46 housing units at an average density of 34.2 units per square mile (13.2 units/km^{2}), of which 24 (52%) were occupied. Of these, 14 (58%) were owner-occupied, and 10 (42%) were occupied by renters.

In 2026, Tessa McLean of SFGate stated that "Some who own property in town only reside there part-time, if at all, so it’s hard to get an accurate count."

== Government ==
In the state legislature, Darwin is in the 4th senatorial district, represented by Republican Marie Alvarado-Gil, and the 8th Assembly district, represented by Republican David Tangipa.

Federally, Darwin is in California's 3rd congressional district, represented by Independent Kevin Kiley.

== Education ==
Darwin is served by the Lone Pine Unified School District. Lone Pine High School is the comprehensive high school of the district.

A school building opened in the 1800s; it had one room and was constructed of wooden materials. In 2026, Tessa McLean stated that the school was "weathered" and that it "hasn’t had enough kids to justify its existence — or any kids, for that matter — in decades."

== See also ==
- Darwin Falls
- Darwin Falls Wilderness
- Darwin Hills
