= California State Route 190 =

State highway in California

State Route 190
- SR 190 highlighted in red; the gap represents the unconstructed segment over the Sierra Nevada

Route information
- Maintained by Caltrans
- Length: 187.590 mi (301.897 km)
- History: State highway in 1933; SR 190 in 1934
- Tourist routes: Death Valley Scenic Byway

Section 1
- West end: SR 99 at Tipton
- Major intersections: SR 65 in Porterville
- East end: Western Divide Highway at Quaking Aspen

Section 2
- West end: US 395 near Olancha
- East end: SR 127 at Death Valley Junction

Location
- Country: United States
- State: California
- Counties: Tulare, Inyo

Highway system
- State highways in California; Interstate; US; State; Scenic; History; Pre‑1964; Unconstructed; Deleted; Freeways
← SR 189	→ SR 191

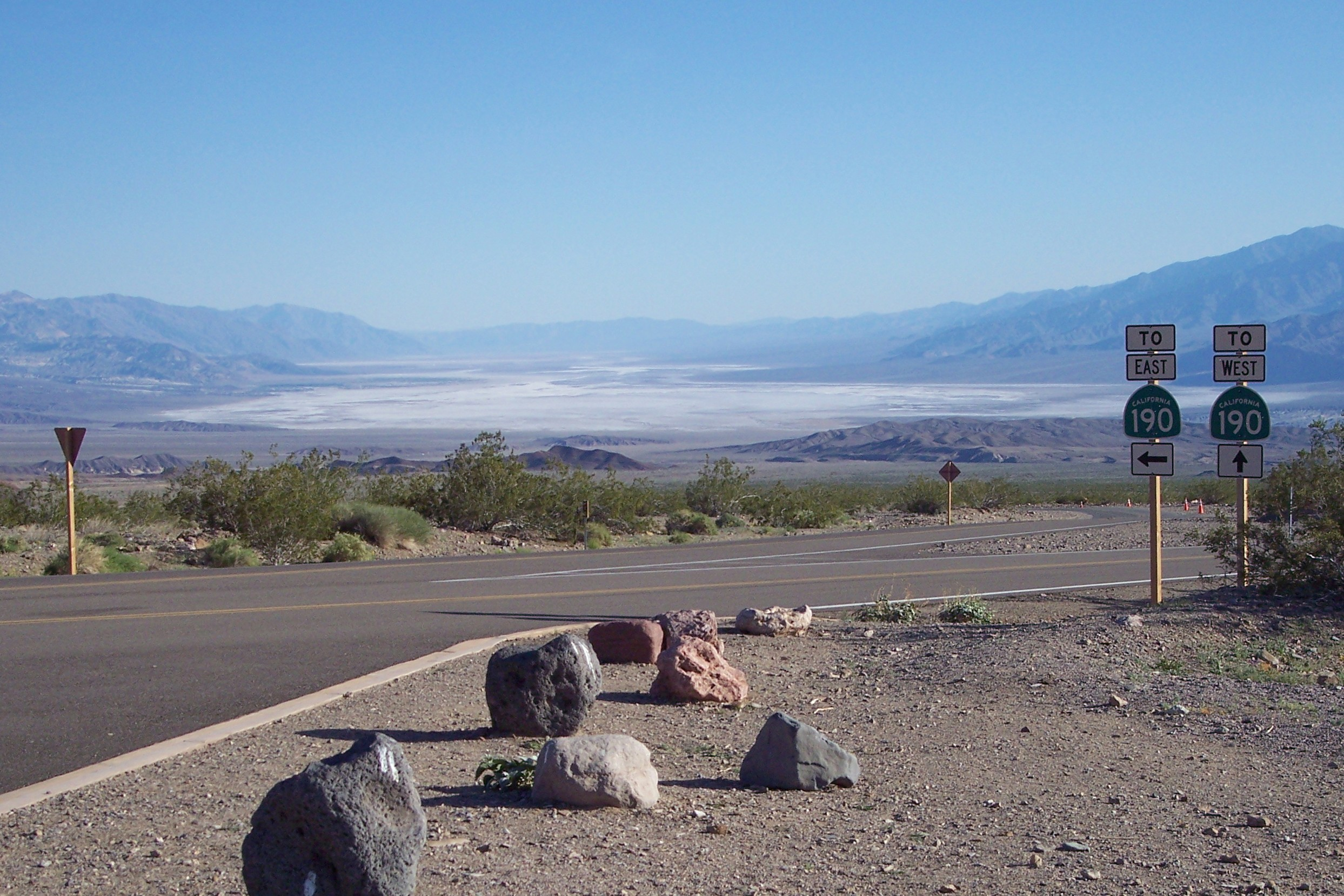
Death Valley and access roads to State Route 190 at Hells Gate

State Route 190 (SR 190) is a state highway in the U.S. state of California that is split into two parts by the Sierra Nevada. The western portion begins at Tipton at a junction with State Route 99 and heads east towards Porterville before ending at Quaking Aspen in the Sequoia National Forest. The eastern portion begins at US 395 southeast of Olancha, heads east through Death Valley National Park, and ends at State Route 127 at Death Valley Junction. The 43.0-mile (69.2 km) portion over the Sierra Nevada remains unconstructed, and the California Department of Transportation (Caltrans) has no plans to build it through the wilderness areas. SR 190 is a National Scenic Byway known as the Death Valley Scenic Byway.

== Route description ==
Route 190 is defined in section 490 of the California Streets and Highways Code, and that the highway is "from Route 99 near Tipton to Route 127 near Death Valley Junction via the vicinity of Porterville, Camp Nelson, Olancha, and Death Valley". The definition includes the gap over the Sierra Nevada that was never constructed.

State Route 190 begins at State Route 99 just south of downtown Tipton in Tulare County and heads straight east along the flat San Joaquin Valley on Avenue 144. There is a short expressway segment in Porterville, including a cloverleaf interchange at State Route 65 and a partial interchange at Main Street, after which the highway begins to curve alongside the Tule River, passing the south side of Lake Success, as the terrain becomes more rugged. Following the river, it meets the south end of County Route J37, an access road to Balch Park in the Mountain Home State Forest, at the forks of the river near the community of Springville. SR 190 continues east near the Middle Fork and South Fork Middle Fork Tule River to near Camp Nelson, where it begins rising into the foothills, going around many hairpin turns in order to rise to Quaking Aspen, the source of the South Fork Middle Fork and the end of the western segment of SR 190. The county-maintained Western Divide Highway continues south to a point west of Johnsondale, where traffic can turn east to reach US 395 via Sherman Pass and County Route J41.

From Quaking Aspen across the Sierra Nevada to southeast of Olancha, Caltrans has adopted a proposed alignment, but is unlikely to build it, in part due to two protected wilderness areas — the Golden Trout Wilderness and South Sierra Wilderness — along the route. The unconstructed routing heads northeast from Quaking Aspen, cresting a small summit before following Freeman Creek easterly past the Freeman Creek Grove, crossing the Kern River near its forks, and then using the path of Rattlesnake Creek and Beach Creek to the Beach Meadows area. Crossing several ridges to the northeast, SR 190 would make its way to the South Fork Kern River near Monache Mountain, then heading southeast along that waterway to the vicinity of Haiwee Pass. That pass, elevation about 8200 feet (2500 m) above sea level, would take the highway over the Sierra Crest into Inyo County, dropping down the steep Eastern Sierra escarpment for 12.0 miles (19.3 km) in a north-northeasterly direction to US 395 southeast of Olancha (elevation 3650 feet/1100 m).

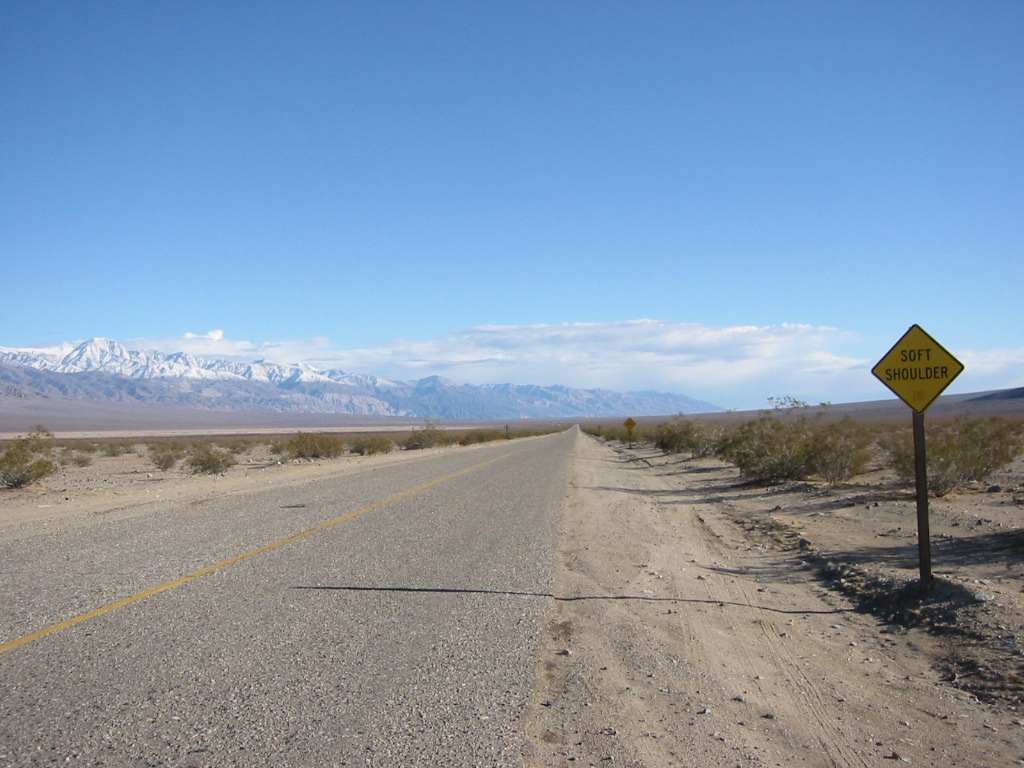
SR 190 in Panamint Valley

The eastern section of SR 190 begins southeast of Olancha in the Owens Valley, at the intersection with US 395. The route heads northwest before reaching Olancha and turning northeast along the southeast side of Owens Lake to the junction with SR 136 southeast of Keeler, where it turns southeast and east around the south side of the Inyo Mountains. After passing the turnoff to Darwin, SR 190 enters Death Valley National Park and becomes curvier as it heads down into the Panamint Valley. The highway crosses the valley and then turns northeast over Towne Pass and into the northern part of Death Valley at Stovepipe Wells. Within the valley, at the intersection with North Highway, which leads to Scotty's Castle and Beatty, Nevada, SR 190 turns southeast through Death Valley, which it remains inside until the turnoff to Badwater Basin, the lowest point in North America, near the settlement of Furnace Creek. It leaves the valley to the southeast alongside Furnace Creek Wash, where the highway is usually closed at least once a year by flash floods. SR 190 turns east away from the wash at the turnoff to Dante's View, and soon leaves the park, after which it follows a mostly straight alignment to its end at State Route 127 at Death Valley Junction.

The route east of State Route 136 near Keeler is on the California Freeway and Expressway System, but is a two-lane road; but except for a small portion in Porterville is not part of the National Highway System, a network of highways that are considered essential to the country's economy, defense, and mobility by the Federal Highway Administration. Except west of State Route 65 in Porterville, SR 190 is eligible for the State Scenic Highway System; the part within Death Valley National Park has been added to the system by the California Department of Transportation, meaning that it is a substantial section of highway passing through a "memorable landscape" with no "visual intrusions", where the potential designation has gained popular favor with the community. This portion is a National Scenic Byway known as the Death Valley Scenic Byway.

== History ==
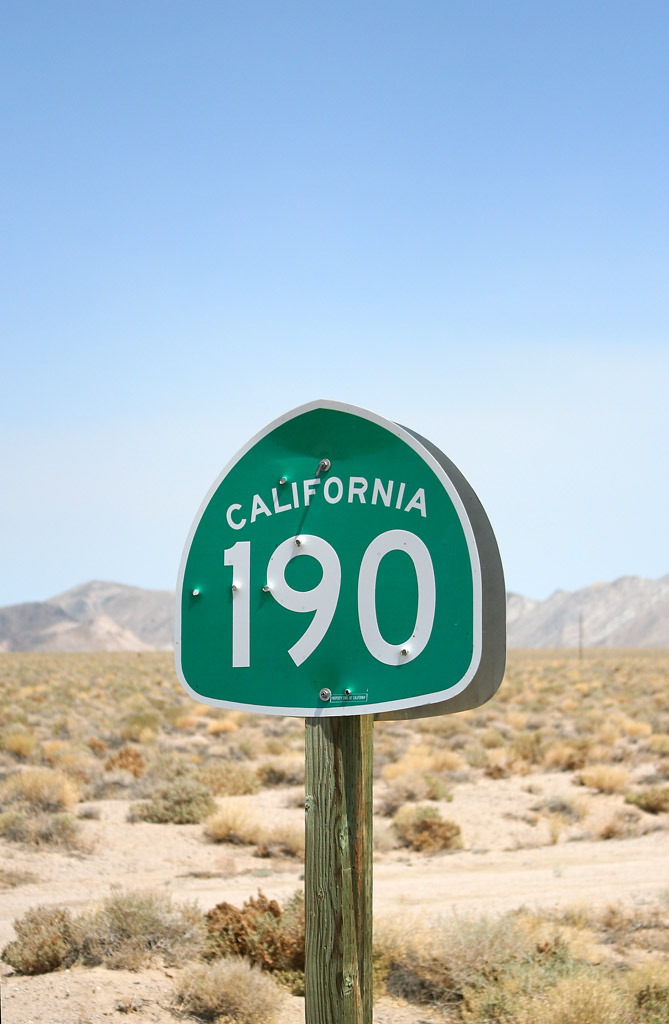
SR 190 shield in Death Valley

The path of SR 190 east of the Panamint Range in Death Valley National Park was followed in late 1849 and early 1850 by the Death Valley '49ers, a group of '49ers that had left the Old Spanish Trail at Enterprise, Utah to look for a shortcut to Walker Pass. The pioneers crossed the state line from Nevada near Ash Meadows, following the general route of present SR 190 from Death Valley Junction into Death Valley, which they left to the west into Panamint Valley and then turned south towards present State Route 178. After ore was discovered in Death Valley, the route became a primitive road, though most travel into the valley, such as the twenty-mule team borax route, was from the south.

The second boom in Death Valley was tourism, started in the 1920s by Herman Eichbaum. After several failures in getting a toll road approved from Lida, Nevada or over Towne Pass, he scaled back plans to include only the part of the latter route between southeast of Darwin and his resort at Stovepipe Wells. The new Eichbaum Toll Road was certified complete on May 4, 1926, and toll rates were set: $2 per motor vehicle and 50¢ per person. In 1933, the state legislature added many roads to the state highway system, including a new (unsigned) Route 127, connecting Tipton with Baker via Lone Pine and Death Valley Junction. The Death Valley National Monument was created on February 11, 1933, and in December 1934 the Division of Highways paid $25,000 for the 30.35-mile (48.84 km) road, giving the 17 miles (27 km) east of the park boundary at the pass to the National Park Service. The state Division of Highways and National Park Service soon paved the route from Lone Pine (on US 395) through Towne Pass and Death Valley to Baker (on US 91). The work was completed in October 1937, including the 17.5-mile (18 km) Darwin cutoff that bypassed Darwin and the old toll road west of Panamint Springs. The National Park Service, using Civilian Conservation Corps labor, maintained the road through the park until August 1942, when an 11-mile (18 km) stretch east of the valley was washed out by a storm. At that time, maintenance was given back to the state, which rebuilt the destroyed segment.

When the state sign route system was created in 1934, Sign Route 190 was assigned to the portion of Route 127 west of Death Valley Junction, while the remainder to Baker became part of Sign Route 127. However, the highway was not continuous, with the roadway from Tipton (which had been built by Tulare County) ending at Quaking Aspen (east of Camp Nelson) and that from Death Valley ending southwest of Lone Pine. In 1923, Tulare County businessmen had begun to push for a new trans-Sierra highway connecting Porterville with Lone Pine, but were set back by a lack of state aid, as the road was not a state highway. The first piece, which would turn out to be the only one built, opened in early July 1931 to Quaking Aspen (and became a state highway in 1933). Grading of the 15-mile (24 km) Western Divide Highway, a county road that was supposed to continue south to State Route 155 at Greenhorn Summit, was completed from Quaking Aspen south to near Johnsondale in July 1962. A new road from Johnsondale across Sherman Pass, maintained by the United States Forest Service and Tulare and Inyo Counties (the latter as County Route J41), was completed in 1976, allowing traffic on the western segment of SR 190 to reach US 395, though via a longer route than the proposed SR 190.

In March 1959, Tulare County approved a change in location of the proposed highway to Olancha Pass (Haiwee Pass, just to the south, was soon considered for a possible alternate location), and the legislature moved the main line of Route 127 south to that location, crossing US 395 at Olancha, later that year. The old route from southeast of Keeler to Lone Pine remained as a branch, and was still signed as SR 190. Also in 1959, the original routing from Lone Pine through Death Valley to Baker was added to the proposed California Freeway and Expressway System, though no parts have been upgraded as such. The east–west piece between Tipton and Death Valley Junction legislatively received the State Route 190 designation in the 1964 renumbering, and the north–south part became State Route 127, as it had been signed; the branch to Lone Pine became a new State Route 136. By the mid-1970s, the environmental movement had essentially killed the planned connection, and the designation of the Golden Trout Wilderness in 1978 and South Sierra Wilderness in 1984 were the final blow, though Caltrans still has an officially adopted alignment designated over Haiwee Pass.

In 2022, construction began on a bypass of Olancha and Cartago along US 395, which was controversial as most residents preferred improving the previously existing route. Once finished, the northern portion, through Cartago, was proposed to become a county route while the southern portion, through Olancha, would become an extension of SR 190. Southbound traffic was shifted onto the bypass on October 7, 2024, while northbound traffic was shifted onto the bypass on November 19, 2024, sharing the southbound carriageway with southbound traffic. SR 190's new connection with the bypass southeast of Olancha opened to traffic on December 19, 2024. Northbound traffic was shifted onto the bypass' northern carriageway on June 11, 2025, completing the bypass in full. However, construction continued until October 23, 2025, when Caltrans held a ribbon-cutting ceremony marking the end of all construction on the project.

== Major intersections ==
Except where prefixed with a letter, postmiles were measured on the road as it was in 1964, based on the alignment that existed at the time, and do not necessarily reflect current mileage. Postmile prefixes include: R reflecting a realignment in the route since then, M indicating a second realignment, L referring to an overlap due to a correction or change, and T indicating postmiles classified as temporary. Segments that remain unconstructed or have been relinquished to local control may be omitted. The numbers reset at county lines; the start and end postmiles in each county are given in the county column.

County	Location	Postmile	Destinations	Notes
Tulare; TUL 0.00-56.57	Tipton	0.00	Poplar Avenue	Continuation beyond SR 99
Tulare; TUL 0.00-56.57	Tipton	0.00	SR 99 – Tulare, Pixley	Interchange; west end of SR 190; former US 99; SR 99 exit 76
Tulare; TUL 0.00-56.57		4.44	Road 152 (CR J15)	Roundabout
Tulare; TUL 0.00-56.57	Poplar-Cotton Center	9.47	Road 192 (CR J27)	
Tulare; TUL 0.00-56.57	Porterville	R15.24	SR 65 – Bakersfield, Lindsay	Interchange; SR 65 exit 43
Tulare; TUL 0.00-56.57	Porterville	15.95	Jaye Street	Serves Sierra View Medical Center
Tulare; TUL 0.00-56.57	Porterville	16.45	Main Street (CR J29) – Porterville	Interchange; eastbound exit and westbound entrance
Tulare; TUL 0.00-56.57	Porterville	16.97	Plano Street	Interchange westbound; at-grade intersection eastbound
Tulare; TUL 0.00-56.57	Porterville	18.45	Porterville Developmental Center (Road 265)	Interchange eastbound; at-grade intersection westbound
Tulare; TUL 0.00-56.57		21.10	Road 284 (CR J42)	Roundabout; western terminus of CR J42
Tulare; TUL 0.00-56.57	Springville	27.30	Road 320 (CR J28) / River Island Drive	Eastern terminus of CR J28
Tulare; TUL 0.00-56.57	Springville	R32.70	Balch Park Road (CR J37) – Balch Park	Southern terminus of CR J37
Tulare; TUL 0.00-56.57	Quaking Aspen	56.57	Western Divide Highway	Continuation beyond the east end of western segment of SR 190, at a point in Quaking Aspen
Gap in route
Inyo; INY 9.85-140.69			US 395 – Reno, Los Angeles	West end of eastern segment of SR 190 and US 395 Bus. overlap; former overlap with US 6 south
Inyo; INY 9.85-140.69	Olancha	9.85	To US 395 north (US 395 Bus. north) – Bishop	East end of US 395 Bus. overlap; former US 395 north; former overlap with US 6 north
Inyo; INY 9.85-140.69		24.55	SR 136 to US 395 – Lone Pine	Eastern terminus of SR 136
Inyo; INY 9.85-140.69	Death Valley National Park	42.70	Death Valley National Park west boundary	
Inyo; INY 9.85-140.69	Death Valley National Park	57.91	Panamint Valley Road (to SR 178) – Trona, Ridgecrest	
Inyo; INY 9.85-140.69	Death Valley National Park	93.21	Scotty's Castle Road – Scotty's Castle, Beatty	
Inyo; INY 9.85-140.69	Death Valley National Park	128.33	Death Valley National Park east boundary	
Inyo; INY 9.85-140.69	Death Valley Junction	140.69	SR 127 to I-15 / US 95 / State Line Road – Amargosa Valley, Shoshone, Baker, Pahrump, Las Vegas	East end of SR 190
1.000 mi = 1.609 km; 1.000 km = 0.621 mi: Concurrency terminus; Incomplete access
