= Darwin French =

American poet

Dr. Erasmus Darwin French (1822–1902) was an American man of adventure. He was born in New York State, trained as a medical doctor and then enlisted in the army, later becoming a silver prospector. He married Cornelia S. Cowles, daughter of Judge Cowles of San Diego in 1858. They had two sons, Alfred and Addison.

== Early years ==
Dr. French was born in Middlesex, New York, on January 20, 1822. He was the son of Harvey and Amanda Hazelton French. His father was a veteran of the War of 1812. He attended local schools before moving to Michigan, where he attended Albion Seminary. While in Hillsdale County, he studied medicine and practiced as a doctor for some years. In 1845, he went to Fort Leavenworth, Kansas, where he enlisted in the US Army at the start of the Mexican–American War and entered the service as a private even though he was a practicing physician in civilian life.

== Middle years ==
Dr. French's goal was to make his fortune in the world, and he set out to do that in December 1845. His plans were interrupted by the Mexican–American War, in which he served. After he was discharged in early 1847, he resumed his quest for adventure, purchased a large ranch northeast of Los Angeles in the late 1840s, assisted some lost settlers who had mistakenly wandered through California's Death Valley, and opened a mining town in South Central California. The residents of that town named the village after Dr. French — calling it Darwin, California. The town is still in existence as of 2017. Dr. French had heard that there was a possible silver lode in the midst of Death Valley. Despite the fact that it was largely unexplored, Dr. French led an expedition into the valley in 1850 but found no silver. In 1860, Darwin led another party into Death Valley in a second attempt to find silver, again without success. The route he took can still be observed in Death Valley National Park. Two other landmarks are named after him: Darwin Falls and Darwin Wash.

The 1846 journey of General Stephen Kearny and his Army of the West across the wilderness of the southwestern United States has been the subject of many books and articles. Dr. French was on that march and captured a vivid account of the Battle of San Pasqual, in which he fought.

== The Battle of San Pasqual, December 6, 1846 ==
Dictation from Poway, California by Dr. E.D. French, July 7, 1887

Dr French was born in the State of N.Y. Jan. 20, 1822, where he remained until 1835, attending the common schools of the country. He then went with his father to Mich. where he attended the Albion Seminary. While in Hillsdale Co. he studied medicine and engaged in the practice for several years. Finally in 1845 Dr. French came to Ft. Leavenworth, Kan. where ho enlisted in the army as hospital Steward. On June 20th 1846 they started from Ft. Leavenworth with 5 companies for Calif. coming as far as Bent’s Ft. in Colo. Here they remained for a short time and then started for Santa Fe, N.M. On their way they met Gen. Kearny about 40 miles from the Rio Grande near headwaters of Gila diver. Near Santa Fe they met Kit Carson who informed them that the trouble in Calif. was over and that the Mexicans were perfectly peaceable. Carson had just returned from Calif. On learning this information 3 of the 5 companies were sent back to Leavenworth. The trip across the desert, plains and mountains was at times hazardous and even very dangerous. After marches long and arduous, almost famishing at times for water and very frequently short of rations, they came to the hills and mountains overlooking the valley of San Pasqual. Here they camped near the residence of Mr. Stokes whither many of the officers retired to drink wine and have a good time generally. Gen. Kearny sent Lieu. Hammond over to view the Mex. camp, and on his return he reported only a small number of Mex. Private soldiers who were there reported from 300 to 400 Mexicans present. Gen. Kearny would not believe the private’s report and consequently in the morning the officers ordered a charge on the Mexican camp. They found the Mex. on horseback ready to leave and seeing the American troops straggling along the Mex. commander, Andros Picho, ordered his men to “Come on and let us kill the d—d thieves.” The American troops were cold and wet; it having rained a little just before starting. Their mules were tired, their powder wet and their officers full of wine. The Mex. were on fresh horses, armed with spears and lancers, and they made a bold dash upon the Americans. In a very short time 20 of their men were killed and 24 wounded. The fight was a very severe one, Capt’s Moore and Johnson being both killed. During the hottest of the fight Capt Moore emptied his revolver, broke his sword and then drawing his revolver threw it with great force against the Mex, saying “There d—d you take that.” Although his men fought hard to save him he was soon pierced through with a Mex. lance and died immediately. The next evening after the battle one man, Sergeant Cox, passed over the river to his long home. The Americans now saw that they must fight and the Mexicans were soon driven back. They then started for San Diego, but the Mex. thinking to intercept them in a narrow defile at the head of San Bernardo valley hastened whither. Instead of going up there as anticipated by the Mex, the Americans, started down the valley toward San Diego. The Mex. then attempted to gain a hill near where the Americans were, but by the efforts of Carson they were prevented from doing so. The command at this time was with Capt. Turner, Gen. Kearny being wounded. The Americans gained the hill on which they were compelled to remain for 4 days. Kit Carson and one other man had secretly gotten through the Mexican lines, made their way to San Diego, secured the assistance of Commodore Stockton’s troops at that time stationed at San Diego. During the four days incarceration on the hill the Americans had nothing but mule meat to eat, and at one time the Mex. nearly secured their mules. As soon as Stockton’s men arrived the Mex. retreated and Kearny moved on to San Diego. The band met them a short distance from the fort and played some very familiar and to them delightful music. On arriving in San Diego they were compelled to send ship to Sandwich Islands for provisions. Remaining here for some time for men to recruit, they then went to Los Angeles. Here the Mexicans soon made a compromise with Gen. Fremont.”

“After the closing struggles Dr. French went to San Jose where he married Miss Cornelia S. Cowles, daughter of Judge Cowles of San Diego. This happy event took place Jan. 12th, 1858. They have two sons Alfred C. and Addison.”

“Dr. French was one of Board of Supervisors when the court house was built, and in removing the records from Old Town to San Diego much trouble was experienced. The parties on the board at first were Dr. French, C.W. B. McDona1d and J. W. Riley. In some way the Old Town men secured the appointment of two additional supervisors in hopes of securing the Democratic member, Mr. Riley, in favor of holding the records at Old Town. Dr. French was chairman and when the vote was taken two members voted that they should not be removed. Dr. French voted to remove and it was done. The debate became very warm and it is said that revolvers were drawn and would have been used on very slight provocation.”

“Dr. French owns 160 acres of very fine land well improved in Poway Valley. He also owns 7 lots on Coronado Beach near Hotel. Def Coronado, also two more lots near center of Beach. Expects to move to San Diego soon.”

== Legacy ==
French died in September 1902 in Ensenada. The Darwin Creek and its Darwin Falls, the Darwin Falls Wilderness, the nearby town of Darwin, California, and all other areas named "Darwin" on the western edge of Death Valley National Park are named after him.

== Sources ==
The above quoted account was written in Dr. French's hometown of Poway, California, a small town located north of San Diego. In 1887, Dr. French was asked to provide his own eyewitness account of the final decisive battle for the future state of California in the Mexican–American War of 1846. Dr. French was a participant in that battle, the Battle of San Pasqual.

This account is a typewritten copy of a microfilm of the original dictation on file in the Bancroft Library at the University of California at Berkeley. The original dictation was done by hand but there is no way to determine whether or not it was written by Dr. French or written by a clerk to whom he delivered the dictation. The typewritten copy is as near as possible an exact representation of the original manuscript including the original spelling and punctuation.
