= Panamint Valley =

Basin in the Mojave Desert, California

Coordinates: 36°03′33″N 117°14′39″W

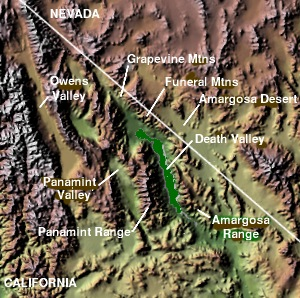
Panamint Valley in eastern California.

Panamint Valley is a long basin located east of the Argus and Slate ranges, and west of the Panamint Range in the northeastern reach of the Mojave Desert, in eastern California, United States.

== Geography ==
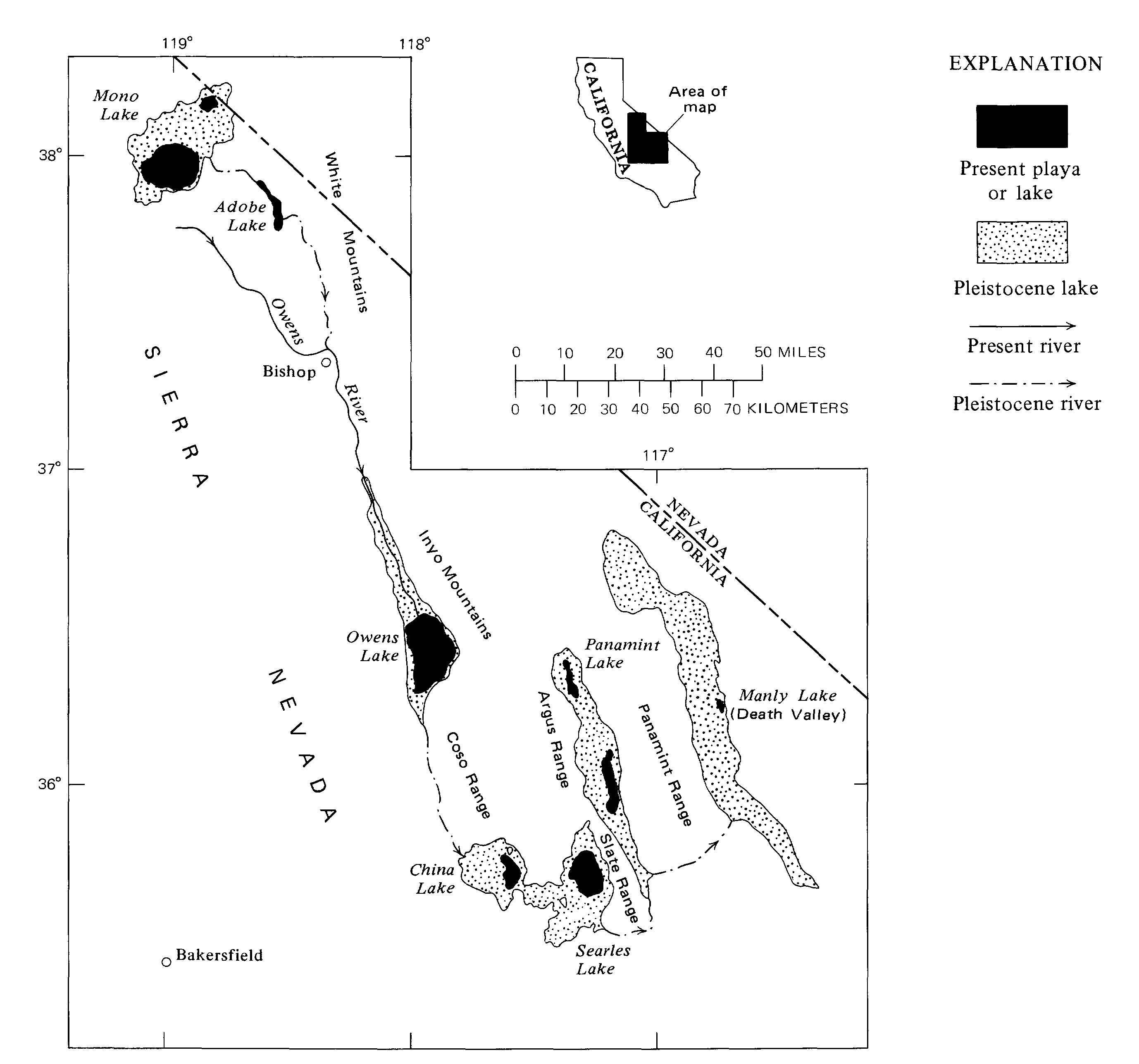
Map showing the system of once-interconnected Pleistocene lakes in eastern California (USGS)

The northern end of the valley is in Death Valley National Park and Inyo County, California. The valley lies in a north–south direction, and stretches from the Panamint Dunes in the north to the Naval Air Weapons Station China Lake in San Bernardino County in the south. The valley is approximately 65 miles (105 km) in length, and is more than 10 miles (16 km) wide in the Hall Canyon area.

== Features ==
- The ghost town of Ballarat is located in Panamint Valley about three miles east of Trona Road, near Happy Canyon.
- The Panamint Springs Resort, on Highway 190 west of Panamint Valley Road near Rainbow Canyon, provides the only lodging, dining, and gas in the area.
- The former Epsom Salts Monorail crossed the valley on a wooden trestle.
- A radar station is located near the town of Ballarat at the south end of the valley.
- Barker Ranch, the last hideout of Charles Manson and the site at which he was arrested in 1969, is located at the southern end of the valley off Goler Canyon Road.
- The valley is an internally drained endorheic basin and its central salt flat/hardpan can contain an ephemeral lake, like it did after unusually heavy rains in the spring of 2005. During pluvial periods of the Pleistocene, inflow from a chain of streams and lakes to the northwest sustained a large lake known as Lake Panamint that overflowed into Lake Manly in Death Valley.
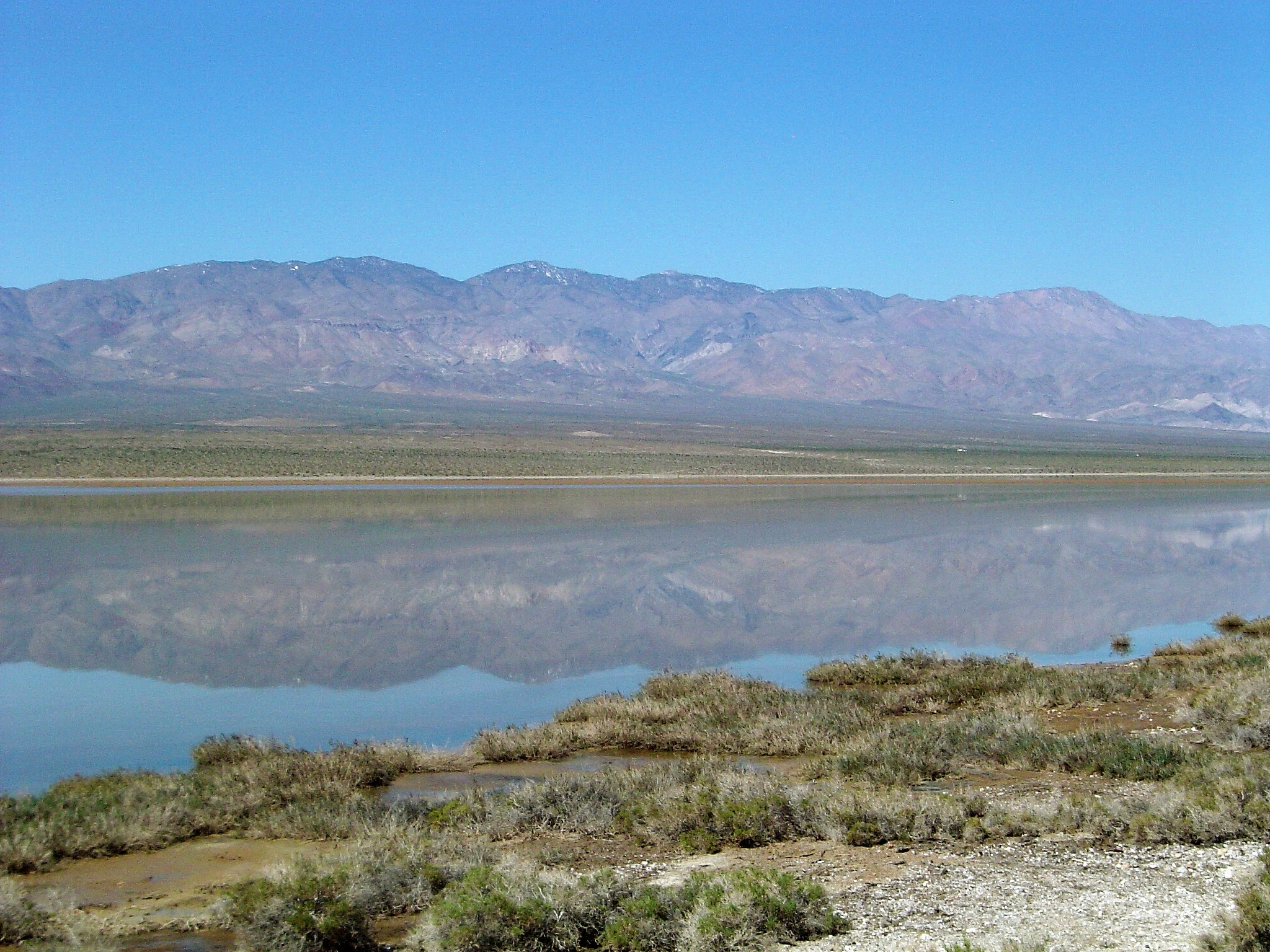
'Panamint Lake' in 2005, view near Ballarat

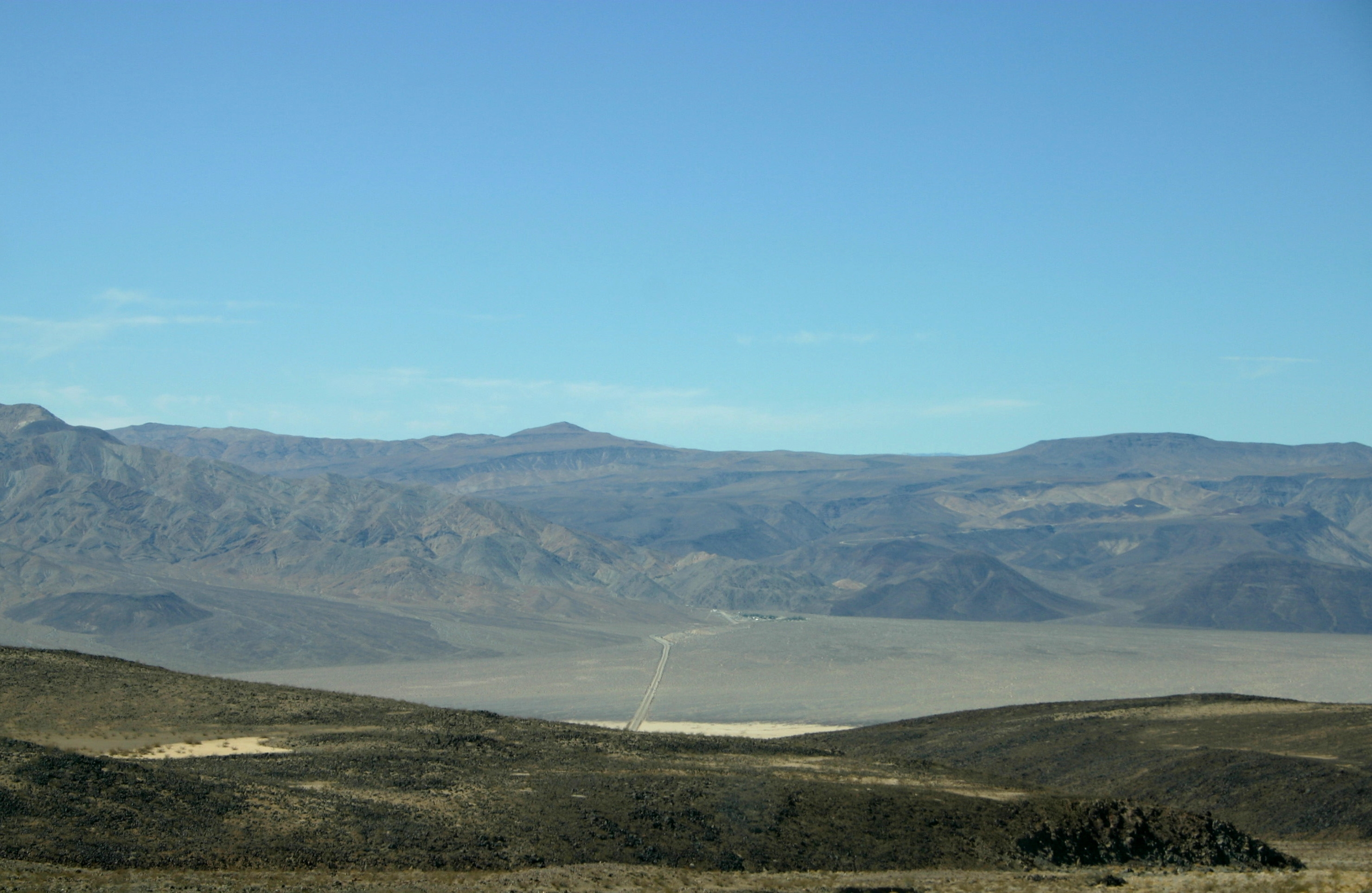
State Route 190 crosses Panamint Valley

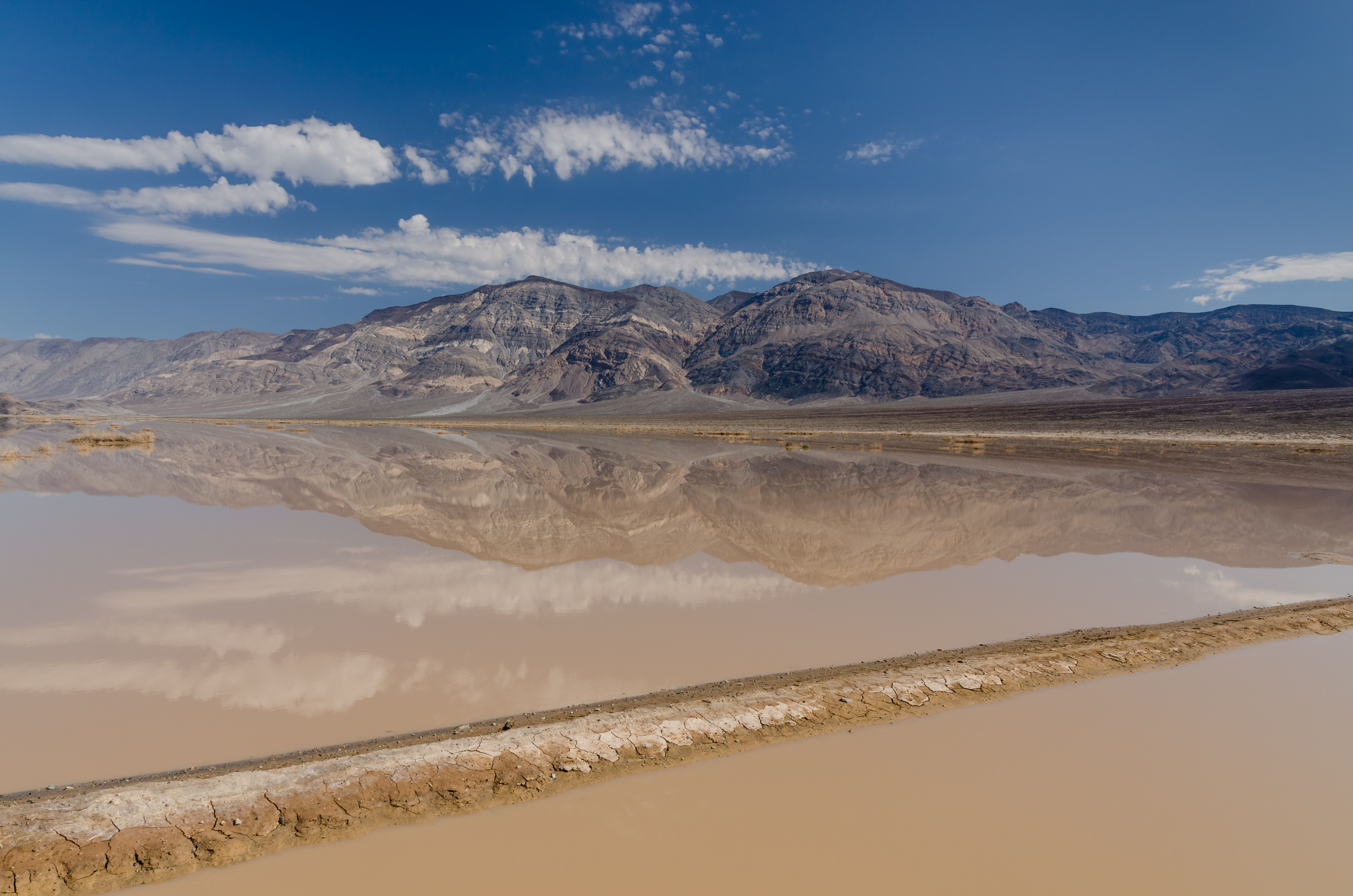
View on Panamint Valley from SR190 with flash floods and reflections in the water

== Military use ==
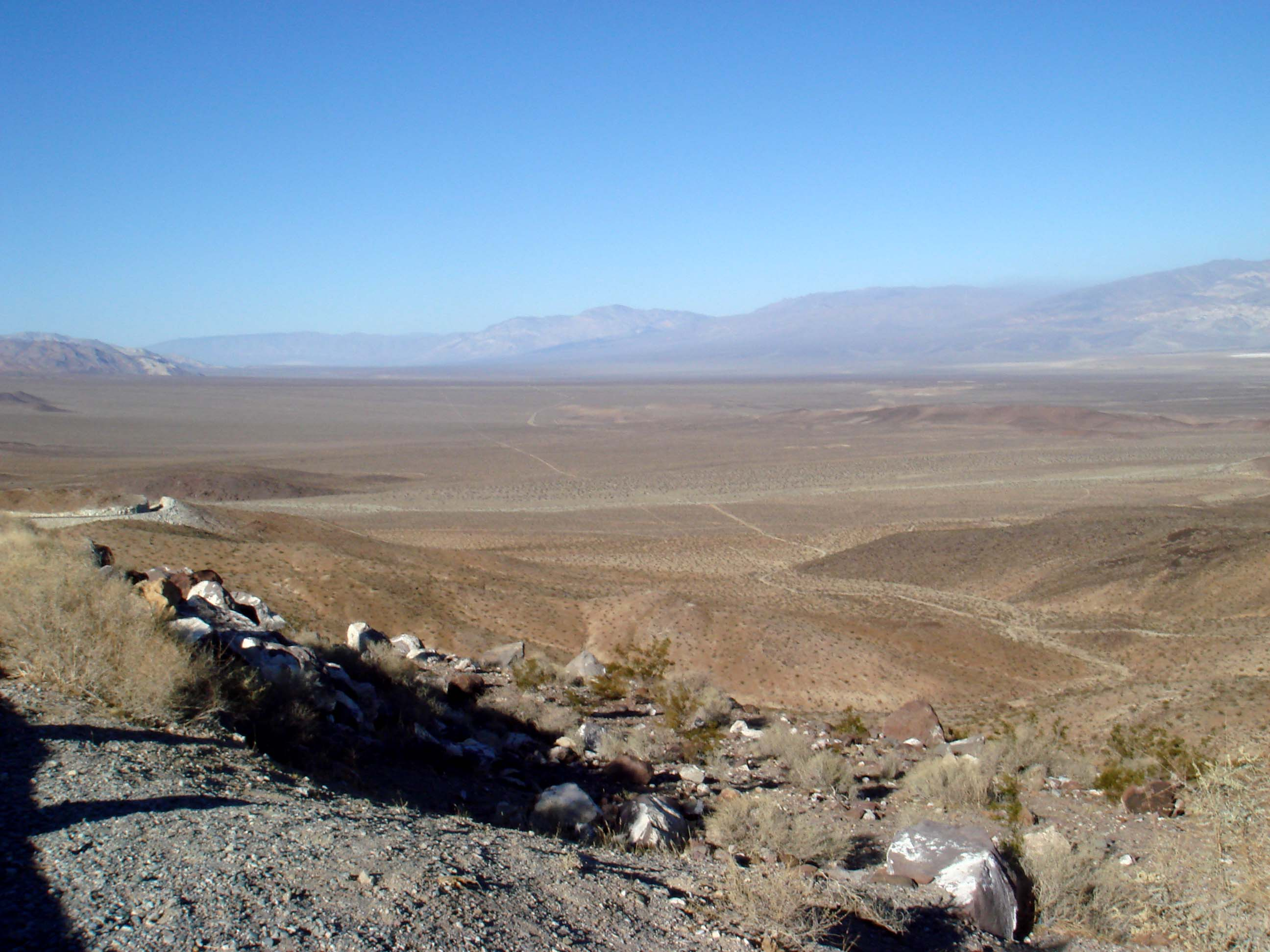
Panamint Valley, looking north from "Slate Range Crossing", a pass that connects Panamint and Searles valleys.

The airspace over Panamint Valley is part of the U.S. military's vast R-2508 Special Use Airspace Complex. The Panamint Military Operating Area (MOA) covers the entire valley north to Hunter Mountain from 200 ft AGL (Above Ground Level) up to FL180 flight Level (flight level is approximately altitude above mean sea level in hundreds of feet), therefore, FL180 would be 18,000 feet) with an Air Traffic Control Assigned Airspace (ATCAA) located above the same area from FL180 up to FL600. The airspace is primarily used by military aircraft from Nellis AFB, Edwards AFB, NAWS China Lake, and NAS Lemoore for high and low altitude mission training. Military aircraft utilize radio communications on 291.6 MHz or 120.25 MHz while operating in the Panamint MOA; however, military aircraft throughout the R-2508 complex often use 315.9 MHz when conducting low altitude operations below 1500 ft above ground level.

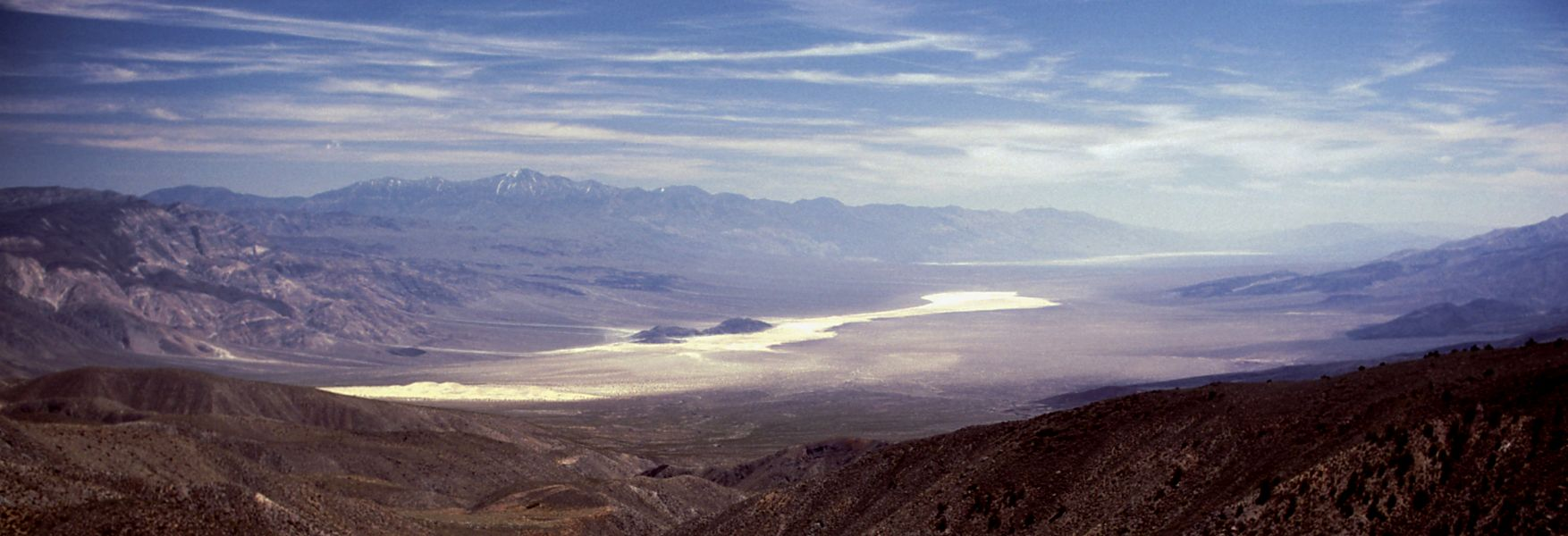
Panamint Valley, looking south from the "South Pass" that connects Panamint and Saline valleys.
