= Sandy Valley =

Sandy Valley may refer to:

- Sandy Valley, Inyo County, California an unincorporated community in Inyo County
- Sandy Valley, Nevada, an unincorporated community in Clark County
- Sandy Valley, Pennsylvania, an unincorporated community in Jefferson County
