= Cowan Station =

Cowan Station may refer to:

- Cowan Station, California, United States, former name of Dunmovin, California
- Cowan railway station, New South Wales, Australia
