= Wilkerson, California =

Wilkerson
- Unincorporated Community; Census Designated Place
- Location in Inyo County and the state of California

- Location in the United States
- Coordinates: 37°16′26″N 118°22′30″W
- Country: United States
- State: California
- County: Inyo

Area
  - Total: 5.728 sq mi (14.835 km^{2})
  - Land: 5.727 sq mi (14.833 km^{2})
  - Water: 0.00077 sq mi (0.002 km^{2}) 0.013%
- Elevation: 4,403 ft (1,342 m)

Population (2020)
  - Total: 543
  - Density: 94.8/sq mi (36.6/km^{2})
- Time zone: UTC-8 (Pacific (PST))
  - Summer (DST): UTC-7 (PDT)
- ZIP code: 93514
- Area codes: 442/760
- FIPS code: 06-85551
- GNIS feature ID: 2409595

Wilkerson is a census-designated place (CDP) in Inyo County, California, United States. The population was 543 at the 2020 census, down from 563 at the 2010 census.

== Geography ==
According to the United States Census Bureau, the CDP has a total area of 5.7 square miles (15 km^{2}), over 99% of which is land.

== Demographics ==
Historical population
Census	Pop.	Note	%±
2000	562		—
2010	563		0.2%
2020	543		−3.6%
U.S. Decennial Census; 1860–1870 1880-1890; 1900 1910 1920; 1930 1940 1950; 1960 1970 1980; 1990 2000 2010

Wilkerson first appeared as a census designated place in the 2000 U.S. census.

=== Racial and ethnic composition ===
Wilkerson CDP, California – Racial and ethnic composition Note: the US Census treats Hispanic/Latino as an ethnic category. This table excludes Latinos from the racial categories and assigns them to a separate category. Hispanics/Latinos may be of any race.
Race / Ethnicity (NH = Non-Hispanic)	Pop 2000	Pop 2010	Pop 2020	% 2000	% 2010	% 2020
White alone (NH)	512	484	393	91.10%	85.97%	72.38%
Black or African American alone (NH)	0	0	0	0.00%	0.00%	0.00%
Native American or Alaska Native alone (NH)	1	8	22	0.18%	1.42%	4.05%
Asian alone (NH)	4	5	6	0.71%	0.89%	1.10%
Native Hawaiian or Pacific Islander alone (NH)	0	1	0	0.00%	0.18%	0.00%
Other race alone (NH)	0	0	7	0.00%	0.00%	1.29%
Mixed race or Multiracial (NH)	16	12	31	2.85%	2.13%	5.71%
Hispanic or Latino (any race)	29	53	84	5.16%	9.41%	15.47%
Total	562	563	543	100.00%	100.00%	100.00%

=== 2010 ===
The 2010 United States census reported that Wilkerson had a population of 563. The population density was 98.3 inhabitants per square mile (38.0/km^{2}). The racial makeup of Wilkerson was 524 (93.1%) White, 0 (0.0%) African American, 13 (2.3%) Native American, 5 (0.9%) Asian, 1 (0.2%) Pacific Islander, 5 (0.9%) from other races, and 15 (2.7%) from two or more races. Hispanic or Latino of any race were 53 persons (9.4%).

The Census reported that 563 people (100% of the population) lived in households, 0 (0%) lived in non-institutionalized group quarters, and 0 (0%) were institutionalized.

There were 244 households, out of which 55 (22.5%) had children under the age of 18 living in them, 151 (61.9%) were opposite-sex married couples living together, 14 (5.7%) had a female householder with no husband present, 8 (3.3%) had a male householder with no wife present. There were 10 (4.1%) unmarried opposite-sex partnerships, and 1 (0.4%) same-sex married couples or partnerships. 65 households (26.6%) were made up of individuals, and 31 (12.7%) had someone living alone who was 65 years of age or older. The average household size was 2.31. There were 173 families (70.9% of all households); the average family size was 2.76.

The population age distribution is 100 people (17.8%) under the age of 18, 22 people (3.9%) aged 18 to 24, 88 people (15.6%) aged 25 to 44, 238 people (42.3%) aged 45 to 64, and 115 people (20.4%) who were 65 years of age or older. The median age was 51.2 years. For every 100 females, there were 101.1 males. For every 100 females age 18 and over, there were 97.9 males.

There were 265 housing units at an average density of 46.3 per square mile (17.9/km^{2}), of which 244 were occupied, of which 200 (82.0%) were owner-occupied, and 44 (18.0%) were occupied by renters. The homeowner vacancy rate was 1.5%; the rental vacancy rate was 4.3%. 466 people (82.8% of the population) lived in owner-occupied housing units and 97 people (17.2%) lived in rental housing units.

=== 2000 ===
As of the census of 2000, there were 562 people, 234 households, and 160 families residing in the CDP. The population density was 98.0 inhabitants per square mile (37.8/km^{2}). There were 245 housing units at an average density of 42.7 per square mile (16.5/km^{2}). The racial makeup of the CDP was 94.66% White, 0.18% Native American, 0.71% Asian, 1.07% from other races, and 3.38% from two or more races. 5.16% of the population were Hispanic or Latino of any race.

There were 234 households, out of which 27.8% had children under the age of 18 living with them, 56.8% were married couples living together, 4.7% had a female householder with no husband present, and 31.2% were non-families. 27.4% of all households were made up of individuals, and 13.2% had someone living alone who was 65 years of age or older. The average household size was 2.40 and the average family size was 2.89.

In the CDP, the population age distribution is 23.3% under the age of 18, 5.9% from 18 to 24, 21.2% from 25 to 44, 32.6% from 45 to 64, and 17.1% who were 65 years of age or older. The median age was 45 years. For every 100 females, there were 105.1 males. For every 100 females age 18 and over, there were 100.5 males.

The median income for a household in the CDP was $35,583, and the median income for a family was $55,625. Males had a median income of $39,750 versus $22,981 for females. The per capita income for the CDP was $20,182. None of the families and 4.6% of the population were living below the poverty line, including no under eighteens and 3.1% of those over 64.

== Politics ==
In the state legislature, Wilkerson is in the 4th senatorial district, represented by Republican Marie Alvarado-Gil, and the 8th Assembly district, represented by Republican David Tangipa.

Federally, Wilkerson is in California's 3rd congressional district, represented by Independent Kevin Kiley.

== Education ==
Wilkerson is served by the Bishop Unified School District for grades PK-12.

Previously the area was in the Bishop Union Elementary School District and the Bishop Union High School District for high school.
