= BUHS =

BUHS may refer to:

- Babcock University High School, Ogun State, Nigeria
- Brattleboro Union High School, Battleboro, Vermont, United States
- Bishop Union High School, Bishop, California, United States
- Brawley Union High School, Brawley, California, United States
- Buckeye Union High School, Buckeye, Arizona, United States
