= Charleston View, California =

Unincorporated community in California, United States

Charleston View
- Unincorporated community
- Location in California Charleston View (the United States)
- Coordinates: 35°57′53″N 115°53′50″W
- Country: United States
- State: California
- County: Inyo

Area
  - Total: 0.75 sq mi (1.95 km^{2})
  - Land: 0.75 sq mi (1.95 km^{2})
  - Water: 0 sq mi (0.00 km^{2})
- Elevation: 2,618 ft (798 m)

Population (2020)
  - Total: 45
  - Density: 59.8/sq mi (23.09/km^{2})
- ZIP code: 92389
- FIPS code: 06-12730
- GNIS feature IDs: 2804104

Charleston View, formerly known as Calvada Springs, is an unincorporated community in Inyo County, California, United States. The Charleston View CDP had a population of 45 in the 2020 census.

The former name is a portmanteau of California and Nevada.

== History ==
Inyo County defines the Charleston view planning area as 67.875 square miles, which is larger than the census CDP for Charleston View, an area defined as 0.748 square mile. Within the planning area, the 2020 Census shows that within Census Tract 8, Blocks 1176–1279, the population is 75.

In 2005, housing developers proposed to The Inyo County Board of Supervisors to build 65,000 housing units in Charleston View. This development was greeted with backlash by residents from neighboring Pahrump, Nevada, whose main concern was that such development would deplete the ground water in the Pahrump Valley.

In 2009, housing developers proposed a scaled-back plan that would allow a total population of forty thousand.

In 2012, BrightSource Energy proposed to the California Energy Commission, to build the Hidden Hills Solar Electric Generating System Project in Charleston View, but was withdrawn in 2015 due to concerns over the effects on wildlife, groundwater, cultural and historical resources in the area.

== Demographics ==
Historical population
Census	Pop.	Note	%±
2020	45		—
U.S. Decennial Census; 1860–1870 1880-1890; 1900 1910 1920; 1930 1940 1950; 1960 1970 1980; 1990 2000 2010; 2020

Charleston View first appeared as a census designated place in the 2020 U.S. census.

=== 2020 census ===
As of the 2020 census, Charleston View had a population of 45. The median age was 29.8 years. 20.0% of residents were under the age of 18 and 13.3% of residents were 65 years of age or older. For every 100 females there were 200.0 males, and for every 100 females age 18 and over there were 176.9 males age 18 and over.

0.0% of residents lived in urban areas, while 100.0% lived in rural areas.

There were 18 households in Charleston View, of which 27.8% had children under the age of 18 living in them. Of all households, 50.0% were married-couple households, 5.6% were households with a male householder and no spouse or partner present, and 38.9% were households with a female householder and no spouse or partner present. About 16.7% of all households were made up of individuals and 5.6% had someone living alone who was 65 years of age or older.

There were 24 housing units, of which 25.0% were vacant. The homeowner vacancy rate was 0.0% and the rental vacancy rate was 0.0%.

Charleston View CDP, California – Racial and ethnic composition Note: the US Census treats Hispanic/Latino as an ethnic category. This table excludes Latinos from the racial categories and assigns them to a separate category. Hispanics/Latinos may be of any race.
Race / Ethnicity (NH = Non-Hispanic)	Pop 2020	% 2020
White alone (NH)	22	48.89%
Black or African American alone (NH)	0	0.00%
Native American or Alaska Native alone (NH)	0	0.00%
Asian alone (NH)	1	2.22%
Pacific Islander alone (NH)	0	0.00%
Other race alone (NH)	0	0.00%
Mixed race or Multiracial (NH)	7	15.56%
Hispanic or Latino (any race)	15	33.33%
Total	45	100.00%

== Economy ==
Due to its remote location, the economy of Charleston View is limited. Most revolves around the cultivation of marijuana.

In 2021, Inyo County approved the construction of light industrial building, that would allow for the processing and distribution of marijuana for cultivators in Charleston View and outlying communities in southeastern inyo county.

=== Tourism ===
A major attraction for religious people in Charleston View is the St. Thérèse Mission. Which is a Catholic church, administered by the Diocese of Fresno. It was built as a way to provide metro Las Vegas a Catholic cemetery after business tycoon Rafael Dizon Jr wanted to honor Saint Therese after his recovery from cancer.

== Politics ==
In the state legislature, Charleston View is in the 4th senatorial district, represented by Republican Marie Alvarado-Gil, and the 8th Assembly district, represented by Republican David Tangipa.

== Public safety and crime ==
Law enforcement is provided by Inyo County Sheriff's department. Types of crime in Charleston view normally deal with unpermitted Marijuana cultivation.

Fire Protection is provided by Southern Inyo Fire Protection District. A fire station is planned to reduce response times within Charleston View.

== Education ==
Charleston View is served by the Death Valley Unified School District for grades PK-12.
