= Mesa, California =

Mesa
- Unincorporated Community; Census Designated Place
- Location in Inyo County and the state of California

- Location in the United States
- Coordinates: 37°25′08″N 118°32′33″W
- Country: United States
- State: California
- County: Inyo

Area
  - Total: 3.656 sq mi (9.468 km^{2})
  - Land: 3.503 sq mi (9.072 km^{2})
  - Water: 0.153 sq mi (0.395 km^{2}) 4.18%
- Elevation: 4,626 ft (1,410 m)

Population (2020)
  - Total: 275
  - Density: 78.5/sq mi (30.3/km^{2})
- Time zone: UTC-8 (Pacific Time Zone)
  - Summer (DST): UTC-7 (PDT)
- ZIP code: 93514
- Area codes: 442/760
- FIPS code: 06-47013
- GNIS feature ID: 2408819

Mesa (Spanish for "Table") is a census-designated place (CDP) in Inyo County, California, United States. The population was 275 at the 2020 census, up from 251 at the 2010 census.

== Geography ==
According to the United States Census Bureau, the CDP has a total area of 3.7 square miles (9.6 km^{2}), of which 3.5 square miles (9.1 km^{2}) is land and 0.15 square miles (0.39 km^{2}) (4.18%) is water.

== Demographics ==
Historical population
Census	Pop.	Note	%±
2000	214		—
2010	251		17.3%
2020	275		9.6%
U.S. Decennial Census; 1860–1870 1880-1890; 1900 1910 1920; 1930 1940 1950; 1960 1970 1980; 1990 2000 2010

Mesa first appeared as a census designated place in the 2000 U.S. census.

=== Racial and ethnic composition ===
Mesa CDP, California – Racial and ethnic composition Note: the US Census treats Hispanic/Latino as an ethnic category. This table excludes Latinos from the racial categories and assigns them to a separate category. Hispanics/Latinos may be of any race.
Race / Ethnicity (NH = Non-Hispanic)	Pop 2000	Pop 2010	Pop 2020	% 2000	% 2010	% 2020
White alone (NH)	177	208	220	82.71%	82.87%	80.00%
Black or African American alone (NH)	1	0	0	0.47%	0.00%	0.00%
Native American or Alaska Native alone (NH)	6	10	2	2.80%	3.98%	0.73%
Asian alone (NH)	4	3	2	1.87%	1.20%	0.73%
Native Hawaiian or Pacific Islander alone (NH)	1	0	0	0.47%	0.00%	0.00%
Other race alone (NH)	1	0	0	0.47%	0.00%	0.00%
Mixed race or Multiracial (NH)	9	4	20	4.21%	1.59%	7.27%
Hispanic or Latino (any race)	15	26	31	7.01%	10.36%	11.27%
Total	214	251	275	100.00%	100.00%	100.00%

=== 2020 ===
The 2020 United States census reported that Mesa had a population of 275. The population density was 78.5 inhabitants per square mile (30.3/km^{2}). The racial makeup of Mesa was 221 (80.4%) White, 0 (0.0%) African American, 3 (1.1%) Native American, 2 (0.7%) Asian, 0 (0.0%) Pacific Islander, 13 (4.7%) from other races, and 36 (13.1%) from two or more races. Hispanic or Latino of any race were 31 persons (11.3%).

The whole population lived in households. There were 115 households, out of which 34 (29.6%) had children under the age of 18 living in them, 64 (55.7%) were married-couple households, 5 (4.3%) were cohabiting couple households, 22 (19.1%) had a female householder with no partner present, and 24 (20.9%) had a male householder with no partner present. 16 households (13.9%) were one person, and 11 (9.6%) were one person aged 65 or older. The average household size was 2.39. There were 93 families (80.9% of all households).

The age distribution was 57 people (20.7%) under the age of 18, 6 people (2.2%) aged 18 to 24, 54 people (19.6%) aged 25 to 44, 93 people (33.8%) aged 45 to 64, and 65 people (23.6%) who were 65 years of age or older. The median age was 50.6 years. For every 100 females, there were 109.9 males.

There were 131 housing units at an average density of 37.4 units per square mile (14.4 units/km^{2}), of which 115 (87.8%) were occupied. Of these, 95 (82.6%) were owner-occupied, and 20 (17.4%) were occupied by renters.

=== 2010 ===
The 2010 United States census reported that Mesa had a population of 251. The population density was 68.7 inhabitants per square mile (26.5/km^{2}). The racial makeup of Mesa was 220 (87.6%) White, 0 (0.0%) African American, 10 (4.0%) Native American, 3 (1.2%) Asian, 0 (0.0%) Pacific Islander, 14 (5.6%) from other races, and 4 (1.6%) from two or more races. Hispanic or Latino of any race were 26 persons (10.4%).

The Census reported that 251 people (100% of the population) lived in households, 0 (0%) lived in non-institutionalized group quarters, and 0 (0%) were institutionalized.

There were 104 households, out of which 21 (20.2%) had children under the age of 18 living in them, 75 (72.1%) were opposite-sex married couples living together, 2 (1.9%) had a female householder with no husband present, 5 (4.8%) had a male householder with no wife present. There were 5 (4.8%) unmarried opposite-sex partnerships, and 2 (1.9%) same-sex married couples or partnerships. 14 households (13.5%) were made up of individuals, and 6 (5.8%) had someone living alone who was 65 years of age or older. The average household size was 2.41. There were 82 families (78.8% of all households); the average family size was 2.62.

The population was spread out, with 33 people (13.1%) under the age of 18, 22 people (8.8%) aged 18 to 24, 39 people (15.5%) aged 25 to 44, 117 people (46.6%) aged 45 to 64, and 40 people (15.9%) who were 65 years of age or older. The median age was 50.0 years. For every 100 females, there were 97.6 males. For every 100 females age 18 and over, there were 98.2 males.

There were 124 housing units at an average density of 33.9 per square mile (13.1/km^{2}), of which 104 were occupied, of which 78 (75.0%) were owner-occupied, and 26 (25.0%) were occupied by renters. The homeowner vacancy rate was 0%; the rental vacancy rate was 0%. 184 people (73.3% of the population) lived in owner-occupied housing units and 67 people (26.7%) lived in rental housing units.

=== 2000 ===
The median income for a household in the CDP was $74,375, and the median income for a family was $76,543. Males had a median income of $51,250 versus $25,357 for females. The per capita income for the CDP was $25,376. About 2.6% of families and 2.4% of the population were below the poverty line, including none of those under the age of eighteen and 6.5% of those 65 or over.

== Politics ==
In the state legislature, Mesa is in the 4th senatorial district, represented by Republican Marie Alvarado-Gil, and the 8th Assembly district, represented by Republican David Tangipa.

Federally, Mesa is in California's 3rd congressional district, represented by Independent Kevin Kiley.

== Education ==
Mesa is served by the Round Valley Joint Elementary School District for elementary school and by the Bishop Unified School District for grades 9-12 only.

Previously the area was served by the Bishop Union High School District during its existence.
