= West Bishop, California =

West Bishop
- Census-designated place
- Location in Inyo County and the state of California

- Location in the United States
- Coordinates: 37°22′05″N 118°27′58″W
- Country: United States
- State: California
- County: Inyo

Area
  - Total: 8.759 sq mi (22.687 km^{2})
  - Land: 8.758 sq mi (22.684 km^{2})
  - Water: 0.0012 sq mi (0.003 km^{2}) 0.01%
- Elevation: 4,367 ft (1,331 m)

Population (2020)
  - Total: 2,754
  - Density: 314.4/sq mi (121.4/km^{2})
- Time zone: UTC-8 (Pacific Time Zone)
  - Summer (DST): UTC-7 (PDT)
- ZIP code: 93514
- Area code: 442/760
- FIPS code: 06-84120
- GNIS feature ID: 2409545

West Bishop is a census-designated place (CDP) in Inyo County, California, United States. The population was 2,754 at the 2020 census, up from 2,607 at the 2010 census.

== Geography ==
According to the United States Census Bureau, the CDP has a total area of 8.8 square miles (23 km^{2}), over 99% of which is land.

== Demographics ==
Historical population
Census	Pop.	Note	%±
1990	2,908		—
2000	2,807		−3.5%
2010	2,607		−7.1%
2020	2,754		5.6%
U.S. Decennial Census; 1860–1870 1880-1890; 1900 1910 1920; 1930 1940 1950; 1960 1970 1980; 1990 2000 2010; 2020

West Bishop first appeared as a census designated place in the 1990 U.S. census.

=== Racial and ethnic composition ===
West Bishop CDP, California – Racial and ethnic composition Note: the US Census treats Hispanic/Latino as an ethnic category. This table excludes Latinos from the racial categories and assigns them to a separate category. Hispanics/Latinos may be of any race.
Race / Ethnicity (NH = Non-Hispanic)	Pop 2000	Pop 2010	Pop 2020	% 2000	% 2010	% 2020
White alone (NH)	2,493	2,233	2,198	88.81%	85.65%	79.81%
Black or African American alone (NH)	1	9	7	0.04%	0.35%	0.25%
Native American or Alaska Native alone (NH)	30	16	42	1.07%	0.61%	1.53%
Asian alone (NH)	29	40	52	1.03%	1.53%	1.89%
Native Hawaiian or Pacific Islander alone (NH)	1	1	0	0.04%	0.04%	0.00%
Other race alone (NH)	4	5	16	0.14%	0.19%	0.58%
Mixed race or Multiracial (NH)	33	42	137	1.18%	1.61%	4.97%
Hispanic or Latino (any race)	216	261	302	7.70%	10.01%	10.97%
Total	2,807	2,607	2,754	100.00%	100.00%	100.00%

=== 2020 census ===
As of the 2020 census, West Bishop had a population of 2,754 and a population density of 314.4 inhabitants per square mile (121.4/km^{2}). 89.3% of residents lived in urban areas, while 10.7% lived in rural areas.

The whole population lived in households. There were 1,162 households, out of which 23.3% included children under the age of 18, 61.8% were married-couple households, 5.1% were cohabiting couple households, 20.0% had a female householder with no partner present, and 13.2% had a male householder with no partner present. 24.6% of households were one person, and 16.3% had someone living alone who was 65 years of age or older. The average household size was 2.37. There were 819 families (70.5% of all households).

The age distribution was 18.9% under the age of 18, 3.6% aged 18 to 24, 18.6% aged 25 to 44, 26.6% aged 45 to 64, and 32.3% who were 65 years of age or older. The median age was 54.1 years. For every 100 females, there were 95.5 males, and for every 100 females age 18 and over there were 93.8 males age 18 and over.

There were 1,268 housing units at an average density of 144.8 units per square mile (55.9 units/km^{2}), of which 1,162 (91.6%) were occupied. Of these, 84.5% were owner-occupied, and 15.5% were occupied by renters. Of all housing units, 8.4% were vacant. The homeowner vacancy rate was 0.7% and the rental vacancy rate was 4.2%.

=== Income and poverty ===
In 2023, the US Census Bureau estimated that the median household income was $117,609, and the per capita income was $46,976. About 2.3% of families and 6.0% of the population were below the poverty line.

=== 2010 census ===
The 2010 United States census reported that West Bishop had a population of 2,607. The population density was 297.6 inhabitants per square mile (114.9/km^{2}). The racial makeup of West Bishop was 2,373 (91.0%) White, 10 (0.4%) African American, 28 (1.1%) Native American, 45 (1.7%) Asian, 1 (0.0%) Pacific Islander, 72 (2.8%) from other races, and 78 (3.0%) from two or more races. Hispanic or Latino of any race were 261 persons (10.0%).

The Census reported that 2,607 people (100% of the population) lived in households, 0 (0%) lived in non-institutionalized group quarters, and 0 (0%) were institutionalized.

There were 1,133 households, out of which 261 (23.0%) had children under the age of 18 living in them, 714 (63.0%) were opposite-sex married couples living together, 70 (6.2%) had a female householder with no husband present, 48 (4.2%) had a male householder with no wife present. There were 33 (2.9%) unmarried opposite-sex partnerships, and 5 (0.4%) same-sex married couples or partnerships. 257 households (22.7%) were made up of individuals, and 146 (12.9%) had someone living alone who was 65 years of age or older. The average household size was 2.30. There were 832 families (73.4% of all households); the average family size was 2.66.

The age distribution was 455 people (17.5%) under the age of 18, 135 people (5.2%) aged 18 to 24, 399 people (15.3%) aged 25 to 44, 957 people (36.7%) aged 45 to 64, and 661 people (25.4%) who were 65 years of age or older. The median age was 52.6 years. For every 100 females, there were 97.2 males. For every 100 females age 18 and over, there were 96.0 males.

There were 1,229 housing units at an average density of 140.3 per square mile (54.2/km^{2}), of which 1,133 were occupied, of which 974 (86.0%) were owner-occupied, and 159 (14.0%) were occupied by renters. The homeowner vacancy rate was 1.0%; the rental vacancy rate was 4.2%. 2,208 people (84.7% of the population) lived in owner-occupied housing units and 399 people (15.3%) lived in rental housing units.

== Politics ==
In the state legislature, West Bishop is in the 4th senatorial district, represented by Republican Marie Alvarado-Gil, and the 8th Assembly district, represented by Republican David Tangipa.

Federally, West Bishop is in California's 3rd congressional district, represented by Independent Kevin Kiley.

== Education ==
Most of West Bishop is served by the Bishop Unified School District for grades PK-12. A portion of the area is within the Round Valley Joint Elementary School District for elementary school and Bishop USD for grades 9-12 only.

Previously, the Bishop USD K-12 part was served by the Bishop Union Elementary School District, and all of the area was within the Bishop Union High School District for high school.
