= Death Valley Academy =

Public high school in Shoshone, California

Coordinates: 35.9789°N 116.2728°W

Death Valley Academy, also known as Death Valley High Academy, is a public high school located in the town of Shoshone in Inyo County, California. It is part of the Death Valley Unified School District. It is accredited by the Western Association of Schools and Colleges, most recently in April 2013. The school mascot is the Scorpions.

In the 2012–2013 school year the academy had 16 students in grades 7-12, down from 38 in 2010. A typical graduating class may consist of three seniors. It is supported under California's "Necessary Small Schools" funding program, being the only high school in the 6,000-square-mile (16,000 km^{2}) school district. It is managed by a full-time teacher-principal and a half-time superintendent.

The school does not meet California's minimum enrollment standards, but the Inyo County Board of Education has committed to keep it open at least through 2016. The district provides transportation to school for students in remote areas; this can involve a 120-mile (190 km) bus ride each day.

The school previously existed as Death Valley High School from 1957 to 1990. From 1990 to 1997 students in the area traveled to high schools in Nevada. In 1997 the school district decided to reopen the high school campus as Death Valley Academy, consisting of a 2-year middle school program and a 4-year high school program.

There is also a continuation school on the campus, Shoshone Continuation High School, to allow flexible and non-traditional education for students who are at risk of not graduating at the usual pace.
