= Dixon Lane-Meadow Creek, California =

- Census-designated place
- Location in Inyo County and the U.S. state of California

- Location in the contiguous United States
- Coordinates: 37°23′00″N 118°25′01″W
- Country: United States
- State: California
- County: Inyo

Area
  - Total: 3.36 sq mi (8.70 km^{2})
  - Land: 3.36 sq mi (8.70 km^{2})
  - Water: 0 sq mi (0.00 km^{2}) 0%
- Elevation: 4,183 ft (1,275 m)

Population (2020)
  - Total: 2,780
  - Density: 827.5/sq mi (319.49/km^{2})
- Time zone: UTC-8 (Pacific (PST))
  - Summer (DST): UTC-7 (PDT)
- ZIP code: 93514
- Area codes: 442/760
- FIPS code: 06-19406
- GNIS feature ID: 2408675

Dixon Lane-Meadow Creek is a census-designated place (CDP) in Inyo County, California, United States. The population was 2,780 at the 2020 census, up from 2,645 at the 2010 census.

== Geography ==
According to the United States Census Bureau, the CDP has a total area of 3.4 square miles (8.8 km^{2}), all land.

== Demographics ==
Historical population
Census	Pop.	Note	%±
1990	2,561		—
2000	2,702		5.5%
2010	2,645		−2.1%
2020	2,780		5.1%
U.S. Decennial Census; 1860–1870 1880-1890; 1900 1910 1920; 1930 1940 1950; 1960 1970 1980; 1990 2000 2010; 2020

Dixon Lane-Meadow Creek first appeared as a census designated place in the 1990 U.S. census.

=== 2020 ===
Dixon Lane-Meadow Creek CDP, California – Racial and ethnic composition Note: the US Census treats Hispanic/Latino as an ethnic category. This table excludes Latinos from the racial categories and assigns them to a separate category. Hispanics/Latinos may be of any race.
Race / Ethnicity (NH = Non-Hispanic)	Pop 2000	Pop 2010	Pop 2020	% 2000	% 2010	% 2020
White alone (NH)	2,327	2,043	1,756	86.12%	77.24%	63.17%
Black or African American alone (NH)	2	4	4	0.07%	0.15%	0.14%
Native American or Alaska Native alone (NH)	31	25	40	1.15%	0.95%	1.44%
Asian alone (NH)	18	44	42	0.67%	1.66%	1.51%
Native Hawaiian or Pacific Islander alone (NH)	0	3	0	0.00%	0.11%	0.00%
Other race alone (NH)	0	1	4	0.00%	0.04%	0.14%
Mixed race or Multiracial (NH)	53	32	116	1.96%	1.21%	4.17%
Hispanic or Latino (any race)	271	493	818	10.03%	18.64%	29.42%
Total	2,702	2,645	2,780	100.00%	100.00%	100.00%

The 2020 United States census reported that Dixon Lane-Meadow Creek had a population of 2,780. The population density was 827.4 inhabitants per square mile (319.5/km^{2}). The racial makeup of Dixon Lane-Meadow Creek was 66.8% White, 0.1% African American, 2.3% Native American, 1.6% Asian, 0.0% Pacific Islander, 15.6% from other races, and 13.6% from two or more races. Hispanic or Latino of any race were 29.4% of the population.

The whole population lived in households. There were 1,196 households, out of which 22.6% included children under the age of 18, 49.4% were married-couple households, 5.4% were cohabiting couple households, 26.3% had a female householder with no partner present, and 18.9% had a male householder with no partner present. 32.4% of households were one person, and 19.8% were one person aged 65 or older. The average household size was 2.32. There were 741 families (62.0% of all households).

The age distribution was 20.9% under the age of 18, 5.5% aged 18 to 24, 21.2% aged 25 to 44, 25.1% aged 45 to 64, and 27.2% who were 65 years of age or older. The median age was 47.2 years. For every 100 females, there were 94.5 males.

There were 1,275 housing units at an average density of 379.5 units per square mile (146.5 units/km^{2}), of which 1,196 (93.8%) were occupied. Of these, 85.7% were owner-occupied, and 14.3% were occupied by renters.

In 2023, the US Census Bureau estimated that the median household income was $55,556, and the per capita income was $27,421. About 9.5% of families and 10.3% of the population were below the poverty line.

=== 2010 ===
The 2010 United States census reported that Dixon Lane-Meadow Creek had a population of 2,645. The population density was 787.3 inhabitants per square mile (304.0/km^{2}). The racial makeup of Dixon Lane-Meadow Creek was 2,287 (86.5%) White, 6 (0.2%) African American, 32 (1.2%) Native American, 47 (1.8%) Asian, 3 (0.1%) Pacific Islander, 215 (8.1%) from other races, and 55 (2.1%) from two or more races. Hispanic or Latino of any race were 493 persons (18.6%).

The Census reported that 2,645 people (100% of the population) lived in households, 0 (0%) lived in non-institutionalized group quarters, and 0 (0%) were institutionalized.

There were 1,166 households, out of which 290 (24.9%) had children under the age of 18 living in them, 591 (50.7%) were opposite-sex married couples living together, 95 (8.1%) had a female householder with no husband present, 38 (3.3%) had a male householder with no wife present. There were 45 (3.9%) unmarried opposite-sex partnerships, and 3 (0.3%) same-sex married couples or partnerships. 388 households (33.3%) were made up of individuals, and 221 (19.0%) had someone living alone who was 65 years of age or older. The average household size was 2.27. There were 724 families (62.1% of all households); the average family size was 2.92.

The population was spread out, with 587 people (22.2%) under the age of 18, 129 people (4.9%) aged 18 to 24, 489 people (18.5%) aged 25 to 44, 813 people (30.7%) aged 45 to 64, and 627 people (23.7%) who were 65 years of age or older. The median age was 48.4 years. For every 100 females, there were 93.6 males. For every 100 females age 18 and over, there were 90.4 males.

There were 1,273 housing units at an average density of 378.9 per square mile (146.3/km^{2}), of which 1,166 were occupied, of which 990 (84.9%) were owner-occupied, and 176 (15.1%) were occupied by renters. The homeowner vacancy rate was 1.5%; the rental vacancy rate was 0.6%. 2,194 people (82.9% of the population) lived in owner-occupied housing units and 451 people (17.1%) lived in rental housing units.

== Politics ==
In the state legislature, Dixon Lane-Meadow Creek, California is in the 4th senatorial district, represented by Republican Marie Alvarado-Gil, and the 8th Assembly district, represented by Republican David Tangipa.

Federally, Dixon Lane-Meadow Creek, California is in California's 3rd congressional district, represented by Independent Kevin Kiley.

== Education ==
The CDP is served by the Bishop Unified School District for grades PK-12.

Previously the area was served by the Bishop Union Elementary School District and by the Bishop Union High School District for high school.
