= Round Valley, California =

Round Valley
- Unincorporated Community; Census Designated Place
- Location in Inyo County and the state of California

- Location in the United States
- Coordinates: 37°24′25″N 118°34′54″W
- Country: United States
- State: California
- County: Inyo

Area
  - Total: 14.000 sq mi (36.259 km^{2})
  - Land: 13.988 sq mi (36.228 km^{2})
  - Water: 0.012 sq mi (0.031 km^{2}) 0.09%
- Elevation: 4,636 ft (1,413 m)

Population (2020)
  - Total: 482
  - Density: 34.5/sq mi (13.3/km^{2})
- Time zone: UTC-8 (Pacific Time Zone)
  - Summer (DST): UTC-7 (PDT)
- ZIP code: 93514
- Area codes: 442/760
- FIPS code: 06-63148
- GNIS feature ID: 2409218

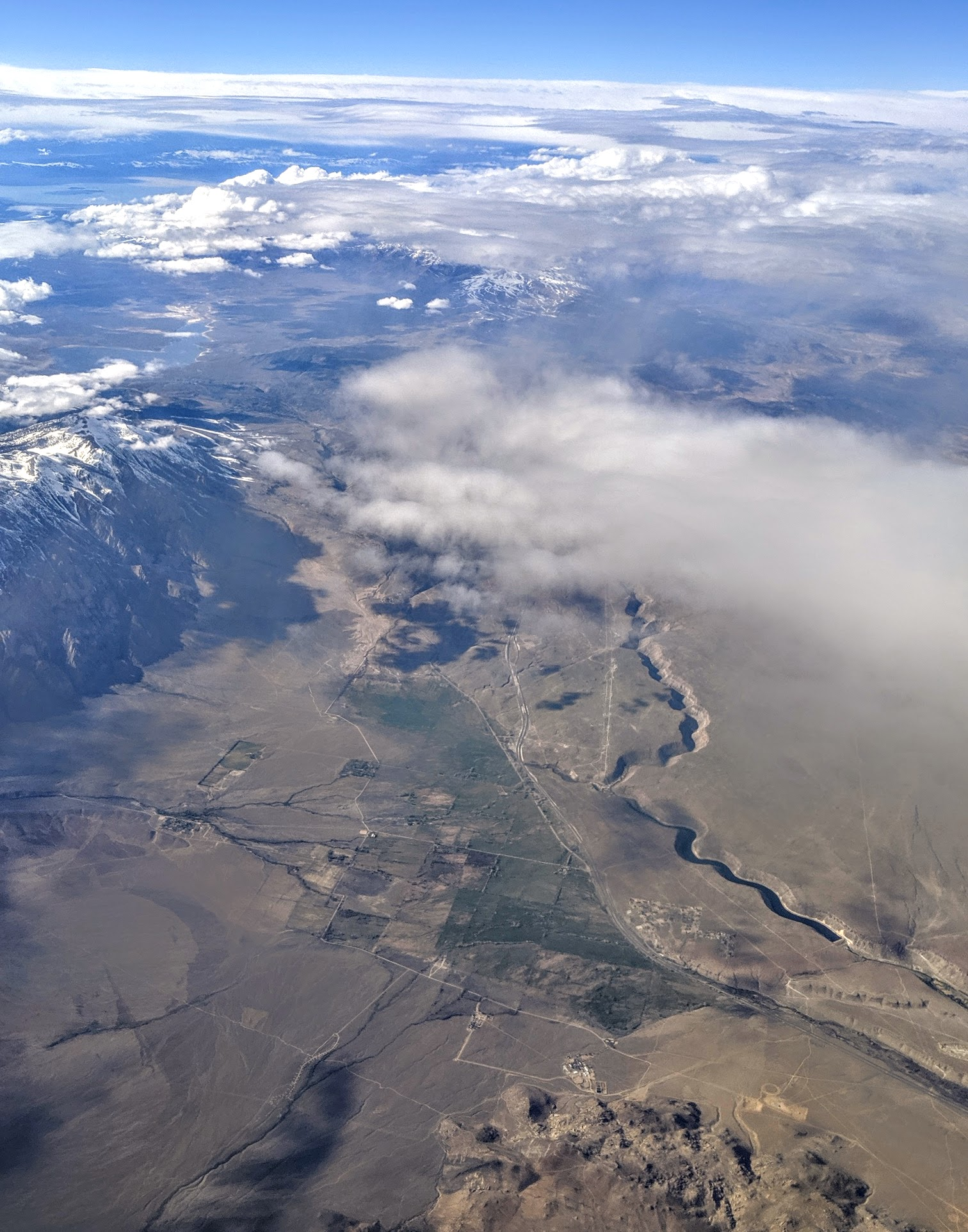
Aerial view from the south of the Owens River and Round Valley

Round Valley is a census-designated place (CDP) in Inyo County, California, United States. Round Valley is located 7.5 miles (12 km) northeast of Mount Tom, at an elevation of 4692 feet (1430 m). The population was 482 at the 2020 census, up from 435 at the 2010 census.

== Geography ==
According to the United States Census Bureau, the CDP has a total area of 14.0 square miles (36.3 km^{2}), over 99% of it land.

== Demographics ==
Historical population
| Census | Pop. | Note | %± |
|---|---|---|---|
| 2000 | 278 | | — |
| 2010 | 435 | | 56.5% |
| 2020 | 482 | | 10.8% |
U.S. Decennial Census; 1860–1870 1880-1890; 1900 1910 1920; 1930 1940 1950; 1960 1970 1980; 1990 2000 2010

Round Valley first appeared as a census designated place in the 2000 U.S. census.

=== Racial and ethnic composition ===
Round Valley CDP, California – Racial and ethnic composition Note: the US Census treats Hispanic/Latino as an ethnic category. This table excludes Latinos from the racial categories and assigns them to a separate category. Hispanics/Latinos may be of any race.
| Race / Ethnicity (NH = Non-Hispanic) | Pop 2000 | Pop 2010 | Pop 2020 | % 2000 | % 2010 | % 2020 |
|---|---|---|---|---|---|---|
| White alone (NH) | 244 | 297 | 279 | 87.77% | 68.28% | 57.88% |
| Black or African American alone (NH) | 0 | 38 | 36 | 0.00% | 8.74% | 7.47% |
| Native American or Alaska Native alone (NH) | 11 | 18 | 16 | 3.96% | 4.14% | 3.32% |
| Asian alone (NH) | 6 | 3 | 2 | 2.16% | 0.69% | 0.41% |
| Native Hawaiian or Pacific Islander alone (NH) | 0 | 0 | 0 | 0.00% | 0.00% | 0.00% |
| Other race alone (NH) | 0 | 0 | 1 | 0.00% | 0.00% | 0.21% |
| Mixed race or Multiracial (NH) | 3 | 10 | 25 | 1.08% | 2.30% | 5.19% |
| Hispanic or Latino (any race) | 14 | 69 | 123 | 5.04% | 15.86% | 25.52% |
| Total | 278 | 435 | 482 | 100.00% | 100.00% | 100.00% |

=== 2000 ===
At the 2000 census, the median household income was $43,750 and the median family income was $49,688. Males had a median income of $41,500 versus $32,857 for females. The per capita income for the CDP was $21,589. 4.1% of the population and 1.7% of families were below the poverty line. None under the age of 18 and none 65 and older were living below the poverty line.

=== 2010 ===
At the 2010 census Round Valley had a population of 435. The population density was 31.5 inhabitants per square mile (12.2/km^{2}). The racial makeup of Round Valley was 333 (76.6%) White, 38 (8.7%) African American, 21 (4.8%) Native American, 3 (0.7%) Asian, 0 (0.0%) Pacific Islander, 27 (6.2%) from other races, and 13 (3.0%) from two or more races. Hispanic or Latino of any race were 69 people (15.9%).

The census reported that 324 people (74.5% of the population) lived in households, no one lived in non-institutionalized group quarters and 111 (25.5%) were institutionalized.

There were 141 households, 37 (26.2%) had children under the age of 18 living in them, 67 (47.5%) were opposite-sex married couples living together, 14 (9.9%) had a female householder with no husband present, 8 (5.7%) had a male householder with no wife present. There were 16 (11.3%) unmarried opposite-sex partnerships, and 0 (0%) same-sex married couples or partnerships. 36 households (25.5%) were one person and 8 (5.7%) had someone living alone who was 65 or older. The average household size was 2.30. There were 89 families (63.1% of households); the average family size was 2.72.

The age distribution was 63 people (14.5%) under the age of 18, 29 people (6.7%) aged 18 to 24, 166 people (38.2%) aged 25 to 44, 148 people (34.0%) aged 45 to 64, and 29 people (6.7%) who were 65 or older. The median age was 39.8 years. For every 100 females, there were 155.9 males. For every 100 females age 18 and over, there were 177.6 males.

There were 155 housing units at an average density of 11.2 per square mile (4.3/km^{2}), of which 141 were occupied, 45 (31.9%) by the owners and 96 (68.1%) by renters. The homeowner vacancy rate was 0%; the rental vacancy rate was 4.0%. 90 people (20.7% of the population) lived in owner-occupied housing units and 234 people (53.8%) lived in rental housing units.

=== 2020 ===
The 2020 United States census reported that Round Valley had a population of 482. The population density was 34.5 inhabitants per square mile (13.3/km^{2}). The racial makeup of Round Valley was 295 (61.2%) White, 36 (7.5%) African American, 16 (3.3%) Native American, 2 (0.4%) Asian, 0 (0.0%) Pacific Islander, 80 (16.6%) from other races, and 53 (11.0%) from two or more races. Hispanic or Latino of any race were 123 persons (25.5%).

The census reported that 374 people (77.6% of the population) lived in households, 11 (2.3%) lived in non-institutionalized group quarters, and 97 (20.1%) were institutionalized.

There were 156 households, out of which 35 (22.4%) had children under the age of 18 living in them, 62 (39.7%) were married-couple households, 17 (10.9%) were cohabiting couple households, 36 (23.1%) had a female householder with no partner present, and 41 (26.3%) had a male householder with no partner present. 50 households (32.1%) were one person, and 31 (19.9%) were one person aged 65 or older. The average household size was 2.4. There were 91 families (58.3% of all households).

The age distribution was 91 people (18.9%) under the age of 18, 43 people (8.9%) aged 18 to 24, 172 people (35.7%) aged 25 to 44, 92 people (19.1%) aged 45 to 64, and 84 people (17.4%) who were 65 years of age or older. The median age was 36.0 years. For every 100 females, there were 139.8 males.

There were 170 housing units at an average density of 12.2 units per square mile (4.7 units/km^{2}), of which 156 (91.8%) were occupied. Of these, 47 (30.1%) were owner-occupied, and 109 (69.9%) were occupied by renters.

== Government ==
In the California State Legislature, Round Valley is in the 4th senatorial district, represented by Republican Marie Alvarado-Gil, and the 8th Assembly district, represented by Republican David Tangipa.

In the United States House of Representatives, Round Valley is in California's 3rd congressional district, represented by Independent Kevin Kiley.

== Education ==
The CDP is served by the Round Valley Joint Elementary School District for elementary school and by the Bishop Unified School District for grades 9-12 only.

Previously the area was served by the Bishop Union High School District.
