= Death Valley Unified School District =

School district in California, United States

Address
- Old State Highway 127 Shoshone, California, 92384; United States

District information
- Type: Public
- Grades: K–12
- Superintendent: Jim Copeland
- NCES District ID: 0610680

Students and staff
- Students: 20
- Teachers: 2.0
- Staff: 9.05
- Student–teacher ratio: 10.0

Other information
- Website: www.deathvalleyschools.org

Death Valley Unified School District (DVUSD) is a public school district in Inyo County, California. DVUSD is located in eastern Inyo County and borders the state of Nevada. It serves the entire southeast region of Inyo County and covers approximately 6,000 square miles (16,000 km^{2}) of the Mojave Desert. The total population within this region is about 1,000, and DVUSD is the only school district to serve this population. Three communities served by DVUSD (Timbisha Indian Village, Furnace Creek Ranch, and Stovepipe Wells) are located in Death Valley National Park.

Census-designated places in the district include Charleston View, Furnace Creek, Shoshone, and Tecopa.

DVUSD is the largest school district in California in terms of square miles covered, but one of the smallest in terms of student enrollment. In 2012, the entire district served only 60 students.

The district provides transportation to school for students in remote areas; this can involve a 120-mile (190 km) bus ride each day. In 2012, the district was spending approximately $3,500 per student per year on transportation.

== Schools ==
- Shoshone Elementary School
- Death Valley Academy
- Shoshone Continuation High School
