= Inyo County, California =

County in California, United States

Inyo County
- County
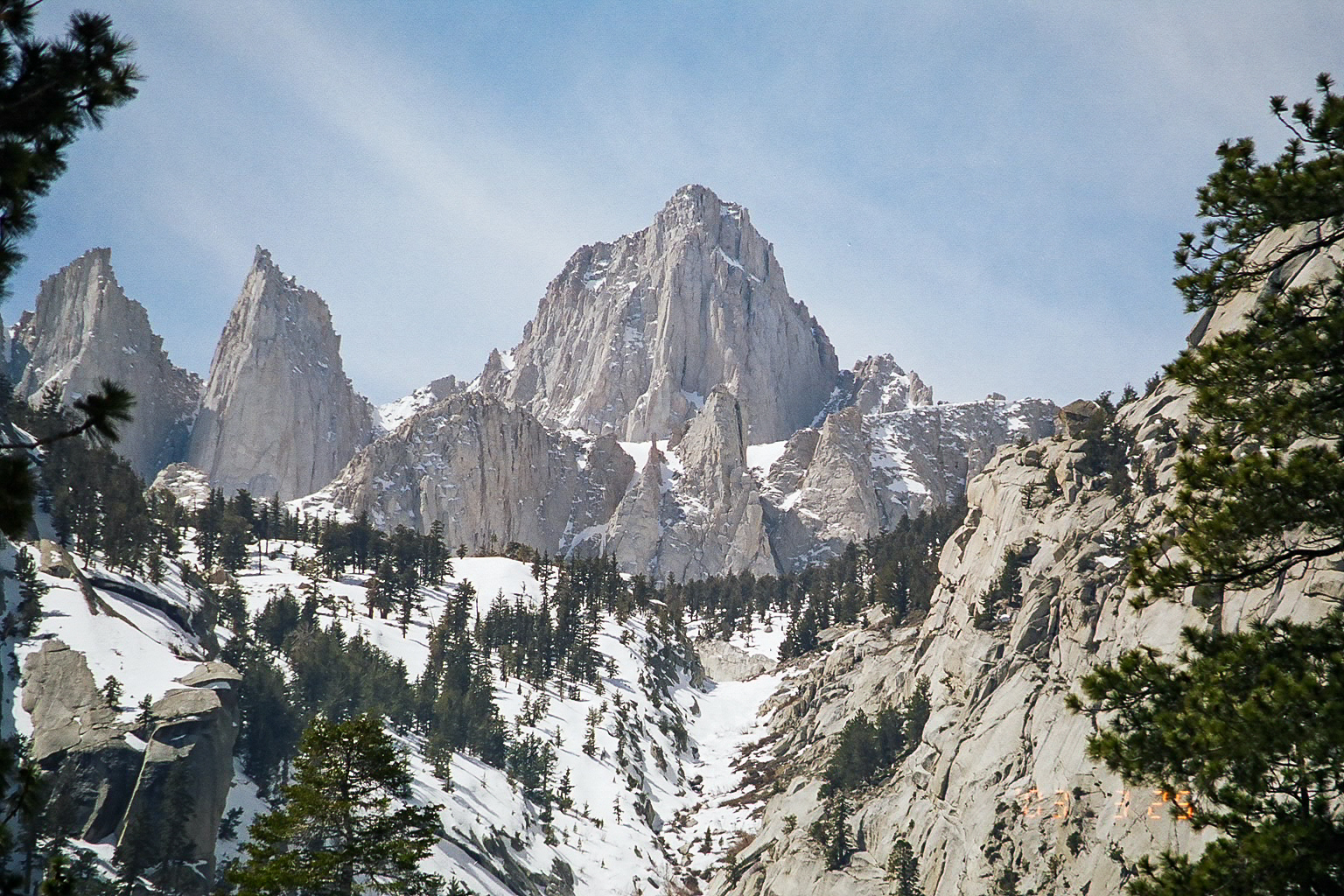
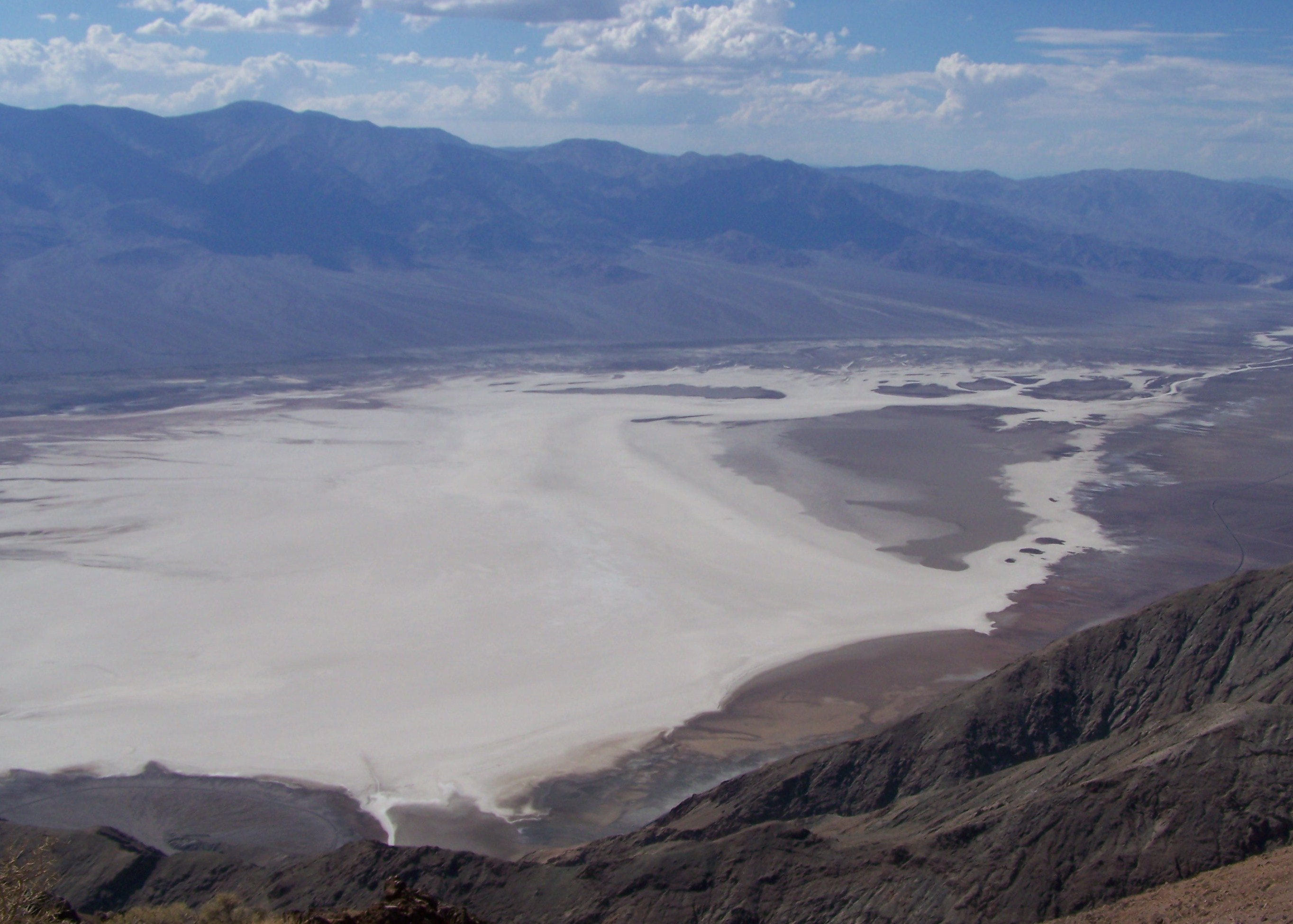
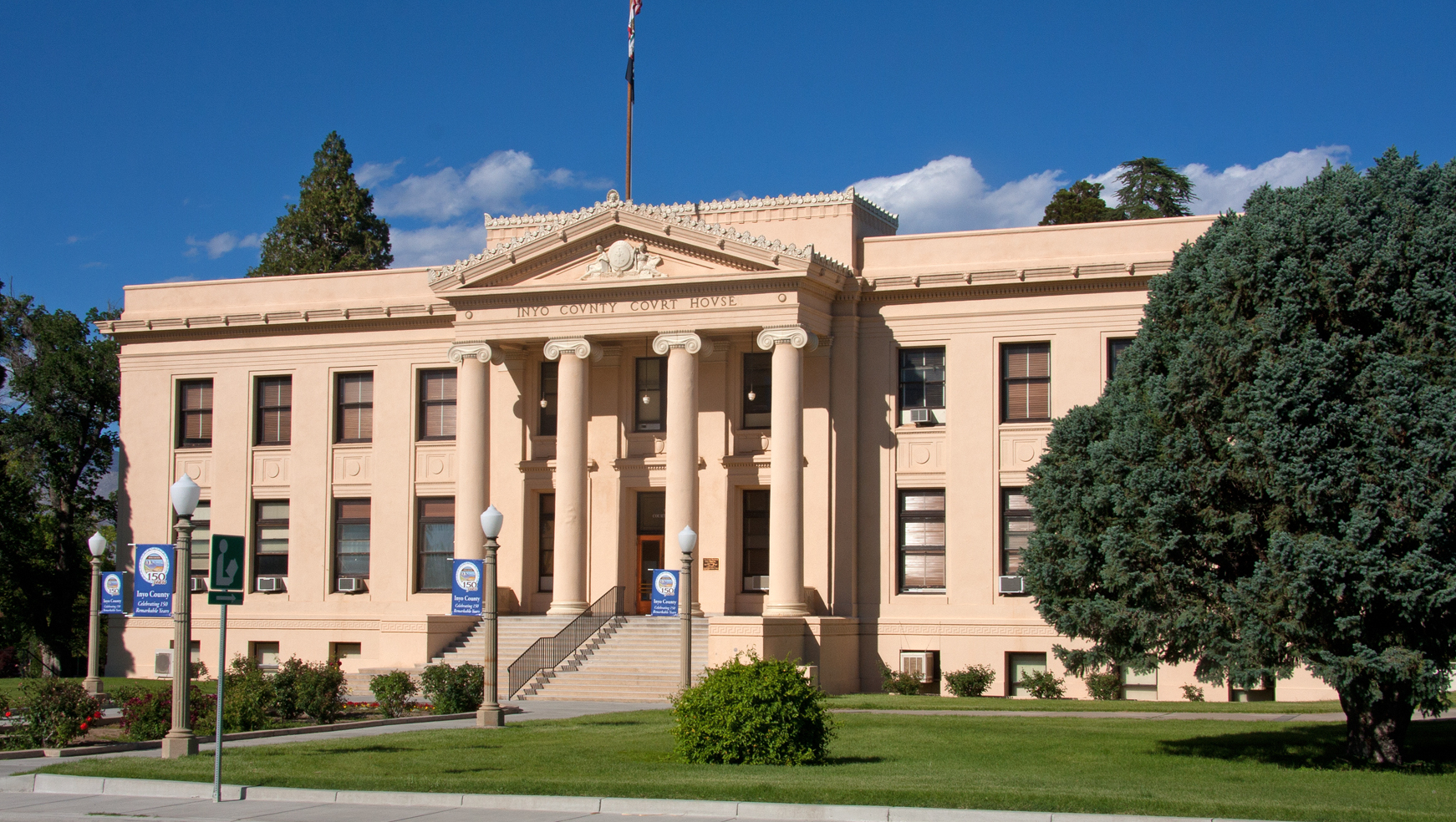
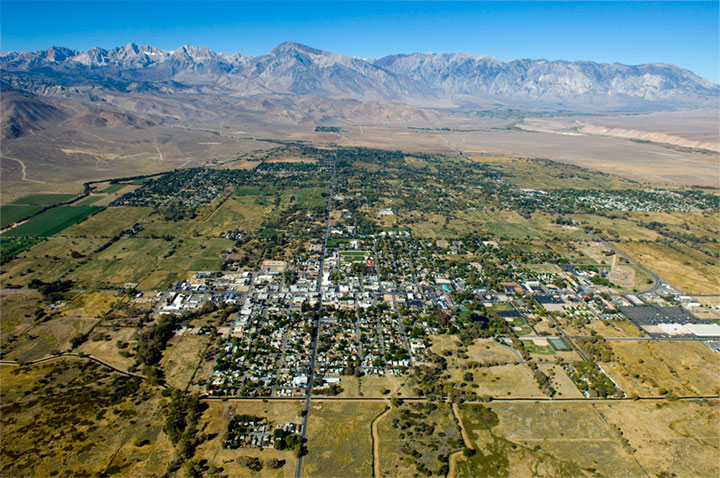
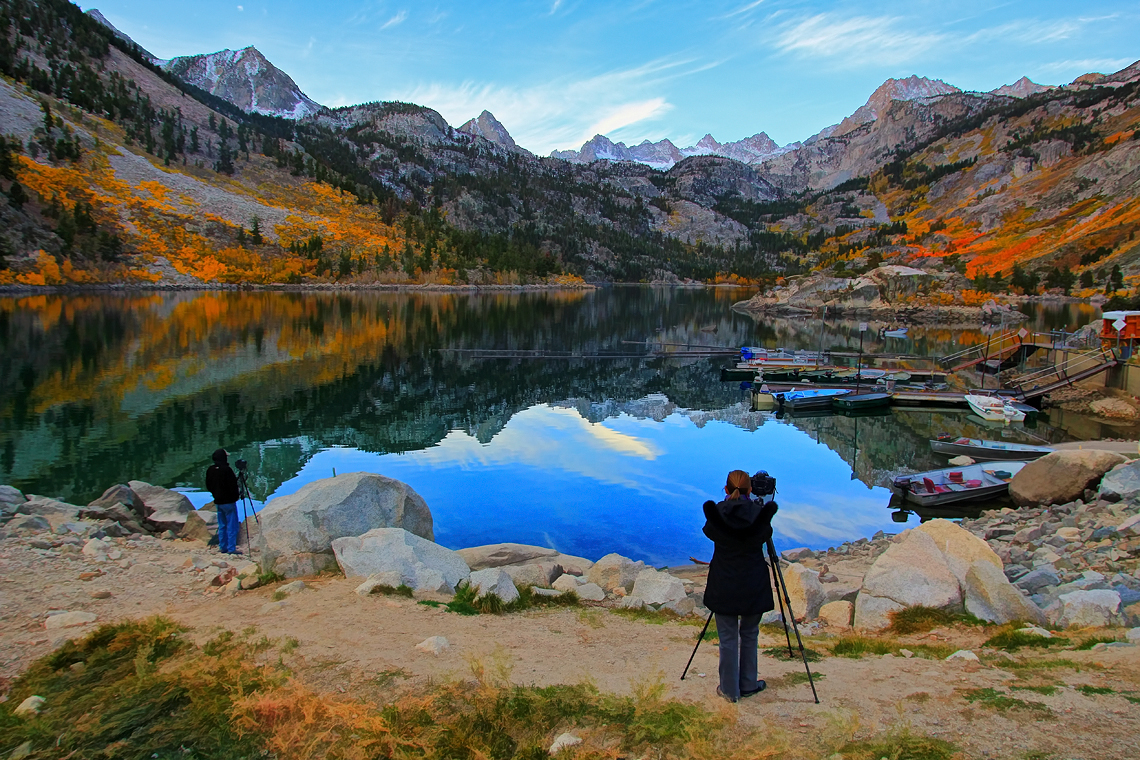
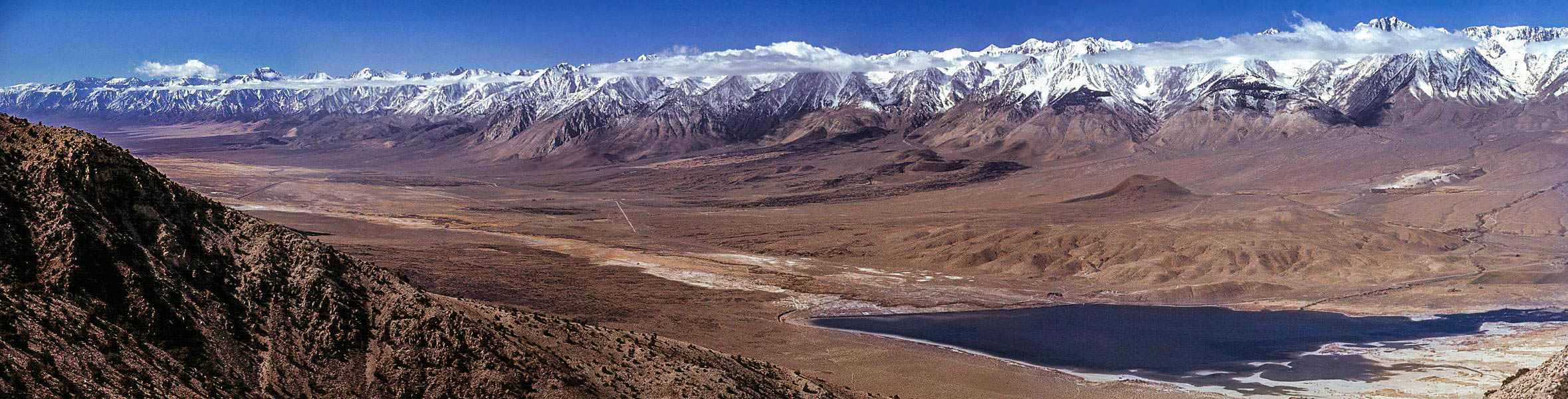
- Mount Whitney in the Sierra Nevada Death Valley Independence Bishop Lake Sabrina Owens Valley in the Mojave Desert

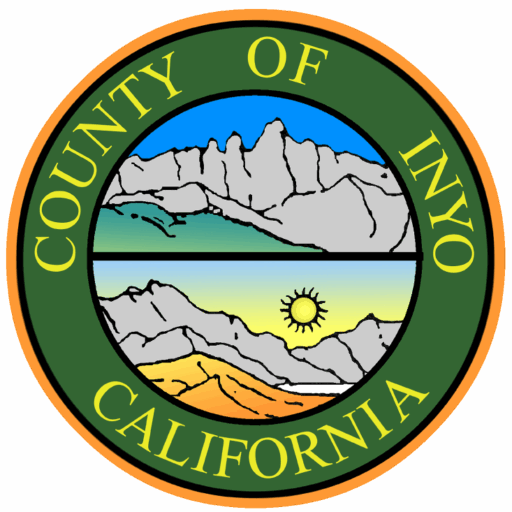
- Seal

- Location in the state of California
- Interactive map of Inyo County
- Coordinates: 36°35′N 117°25′W
- Country: United States
- State: California
- Region: Californian Deserts
- Established: March 22, 1866
- Named for: ɨnnɨyun 'it's dangerous' in Timbisha
- County seat: Independence
- Largest city: Bishop

Government
  - Type: Council–CAO
  - Body: Board of Supervisors
  - Chair: Trina Orrill
  - Vice Chair: Jeff Griffiths
  - Board of Supervisors: Supervisors: Trina Orrill; Jeff Griffiths; Scott Marcellin; Jennifer Roeser; Will Wadelton
  - County Administrator: Nate Greenburg

Area
  - Total: 10,227 sq mi (26,490 km^{2})
  - Land: 10,181 sq mi (26,370 km^{2})
  - Water: 46 sq mi (120 km^{2}) 0.45%
- Highest elevation: 14,505 ft (4,421 m)
- Lowest elevation: −282 ft (−86 m)

Population (2020)
  - Total: 19,016
  - Estimate (2025): 18,158 ▼
  - Density: 1.8678/sq mi (0.72116/km^{2})

GDP
  - Total: $1.355 billion (2022)
- Time zone: UTC−8 (Pacific Time Zone)
  - Summer (DST): UTC−7 (Pacific Daylight Time)
- Area codes: 442/760
- FIPS code: 06-027
- GNIS feature ID: 1804637
- Congressional district: 3rd
- Website: www.inyocounty.us

Inyo County (/ˈɪnjoʊ/) is a county in the eastern central part of the U.S. state of California, located between the Sierra Nevada and the state of Nevada. In the 2020 census, the population was 19,016. The county seat is Independence. Inyo County is on the east side of the Sierra Nevada and southeast of Yosemite National Park in Central California. It contains the Owens River Valley; it is flanked to the west by the Sierra Nevada and to the east by the White Mountains and the Inyo Mountains. Mono County is to the north. With an area of 10,192 square miles (26,400 km^{2}), Inyo is the second-largest county by area in California, after San Bernardino County which is directly south of Inyo County. Almost half of Inyo County's area is within Death Valley National Park. However, with a population density of 1.8 people per square mile, it also has the second-lowest population density in California, after Alpine County.

== History ==
Present-day Inyo county has been the historic homeland for thousands of years of the Mono, Timbisha, Kawaiisu, and Northern Paiute Native Americans. The descendants of these ancestors continue to live in their traditional homelands in the Owens River Valley and in Death Valley National Park.

Inyo County was formed in 1866 out of the territory of the unorganized Coso County, which had been created on April 4, 1864, from parts of Mono County and Tulare County. It acquired more territory from Mono County in 1870 and Kern County and San Bernardino County in 1872.

For many years it has been commonly believed that the county derived its name from the Mono tribe's name for the mountains in its former homeland. Actually the name came to be thought of, mistakenly, as the name of the mountains to the east of the Owens Valley when the first whites there asked the local Owens Valley Paiutes for the name of the mountains to the east. They responded that that was the land of Inyo. They meant by this that those lands belonged to the Timbisha tribe headed by a man whose name was Inyo. Inyo was the name of the headman of one of the Timbisha bands at the time of contact when the first whites, the Bennett-Arcane Party of 1849, wandered, lost, into Death Valley on their expedition to the gold fields of western California. The Owens Valley whites misunderstood the reference and thought that Inyo was the name of the mountains when actually it was the name of the chief, or headman, of the tribe that had those mountains as part of their homeland. In Timbisha, ɨnnɨyun means "it's (or he's) dangerous".

To supply the growing City of Los Angeles, water was diverted from the Owens River into the Los Angeles Aqueduct in 1913. The Owens River Valley cultures and environments changed substantially. From the 1910s to 1930s the Los Angeles Department of Water and Power purchased much of the valley for water rights and control. In 1941 the Los Angeles Department of Water and Power extended the Los Angeles Aqueduct system farther upriver into the Mono Basin.

The county was home to the Manzanar War Relocation Center, where Japanese Americans were interned during World War II.

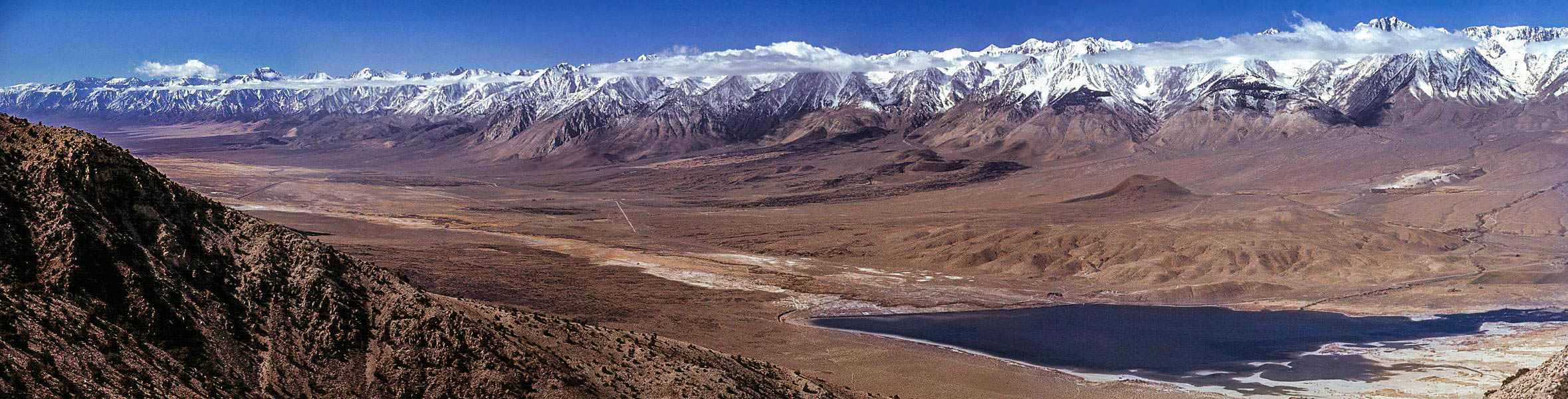
Owens Valley and the Sierra Escarpment

== Natural history ==
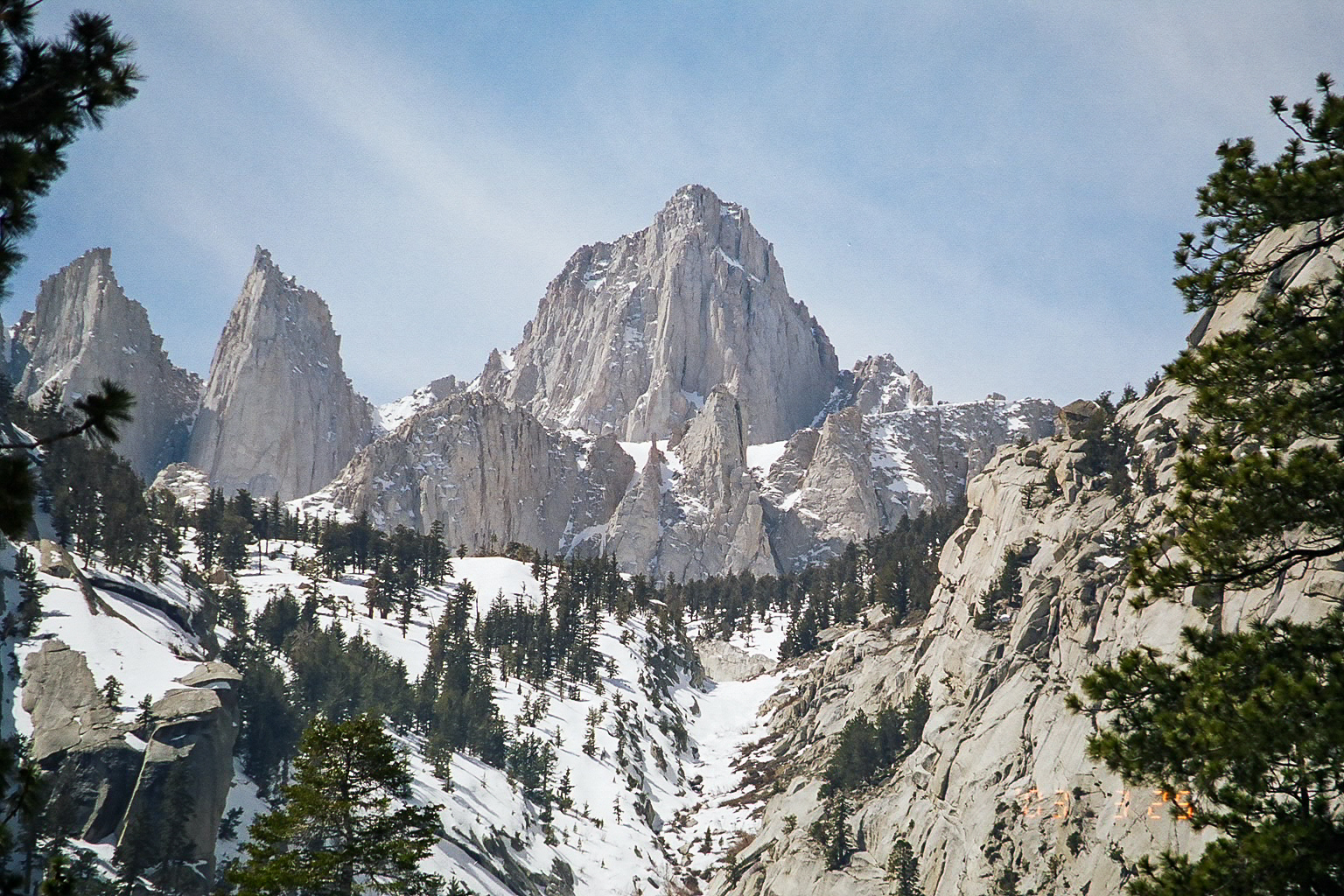
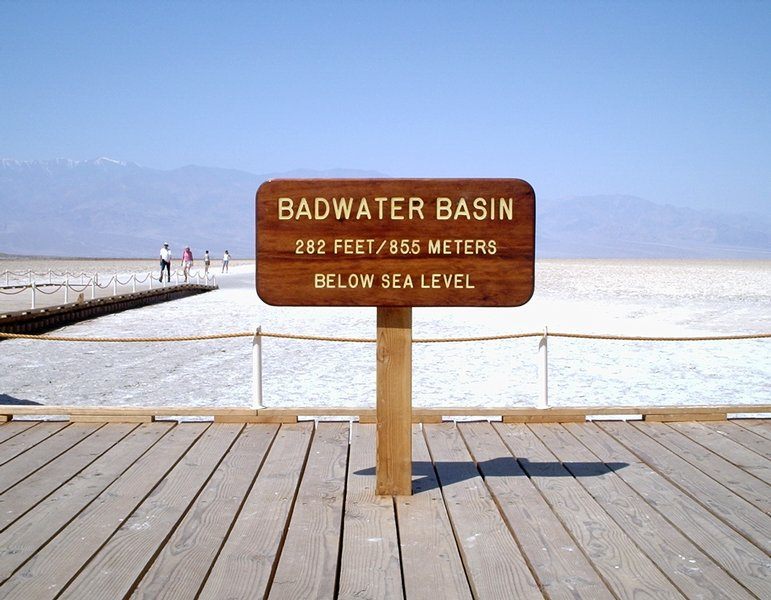
Mount Whitney (top) is less than 90 miles (140 km) away from Badwater Basin in Death Valley (bottom).

Inyo County is host to a number of natural superlatives. Among them are:

- Mount Whitney, with an elevation of 14,505 feet (4,421 m), the highest point in the contiguous United States, the 12th highest peak in the U.S., and the 24th highest peak in North America.
- Badwater Basin, in Death Valley, the lowest point in North America
- Methuselah, an ancient Bristlecone pine tree and one of the oldest living trees on Earth
- Owens Valley, the deepest valley on the American continents
- Two mountain ranges exceeding 14,000 feet (4,300 m) in elevation: The Sierra Nevada and the White Mountains
- Ten of California's twelve peaks which exceed 14,000 feet (a Fourteener) in elevation; the isolated Mount Shasta in northern California, and White Mountain Peak in neighboring Mono County, are the only California 14ers not (at least partly) in Inyo County
- The largest escarpment in the United States, rising from the floor of Death Valley to the top of Telescope Peak in the Panamint Range

== Geography ==
Approximate area of the Mojave Desert ecoregion.

Mount Whitney, the highest peak in the contiguous United States, is on Inyo County's western border (with Tulare County). The Badwater Basin in Death Valley National Park, the lowest place in North America, is in eastern Inyo County. The difference between the two points is about 14,700 feet (4,500 m). They are not visible from each other, but both can be observed from the Panamint Range on the west side of Death Valley, above the Panamint Valley. Thus, Inyo County has the greatest elevation difference among all of the counties and county-equivalents in the contiguous United States.

According to the U.S. Census Bureau, the county has a total area of 10,227 square miles (26,490 km^{2}), of which 10,181 square miles (26,370 km^{2}) is land and 46 square miles (120 km^{2}) (0.5%) is water. It is the second-largest county by area in California and the ninth-largest in the United States (excluding boroughs and census areas in Alaska).

=== Lakes ===
- Camp Lake
- Cottonwood Lakes
- Diaz Lake
- Dingleberry Lake
- Granite Lake
- Inconsolable Lake
- Loch Leven
- Mills Lake
- Pee Wee Lake
- Robinson Lake
- Rock Creek Lake
- Lake Sabrina
- Weir Lake
- Wishbone Lake

=== National protected areas ===
- Death Valley National Park (part)
- Inyo National Forest (part)
- Manzanar National Historic Site

There are 22 official wilderness areas in Inyo County that are part of the National Wilderness Preservation System. This is the second-largest number of any county, exceeded only by San Bernardino County's 35 wilderness areas. Most of these are managed solely by the Bureau of Land Management, but four are integral components of Death Valley National Park or Inyo National Forest and are thus managed by either the National Park Service or the Forest Service. Some of these wilderness areas also extend into neighboring counties.

Except as noted, the wilderness areas are managed solely by the Bureau of Land Management and lie entirely within Inyo County:

- Argus Range Wilderness
- Coso Range Wilderness
- Darwin Falls Wilderness
- Death Valley Wilderness (part)
- Funeral Mountains Wilderness
- Golden Trout Wilderness (part)
- Ibex Wilderness
- Inyo Mountains Wilderness (part)
- John Muir Wilderness (part)
- Malpais Mesa Wilderness
- Manly Peak Wilderness
- Nopah Range Wilderness
- Owens Peak Wilderness (part)
- Pahrump Valley Wilderness (part)
- Piper Mountain Wilderness
- Resting Spring Range Wilderness
- Sacatar Trail Wilderness (part)
- Saddle Peak Hills Wilderness (part)
- South Nopah Range Wilderness
- South Sierra Wilderness (part)
- Surprise Canyon Wilderness
- Sylvania Mountains Wilderness

=== Death Valley National Park ===
Death Valley National Park is a mostly arid United States National Park east of the Sierra Nevada mountain range in southern Inyo County and northern San Bernardino County in California, with a small extension into southwestern Nye County and extreme southern Esmeralda County in Nevada. In addition, there is an exclave (Devil's Hole) in southern Nye County. The park covers 5,262 square miles (13,630 km^{2}), encompassing Saline Valley, a large part of Panamint Valley, almost all of Death Valley, and parts of several mountain ranges. Death Valley National Monument was proclaimed in 1933, placing the area under federal protection. In 1994, the monument was redesignated a national park, as well as being substantially expanded to include Saline and Eureka Valleys.

It is the hottest and driest of the national parks in the United States. It also features the second-lowest point in the Western Hemisphere and the lowest point in North America at the Badwater Basin, which is 282 feet (86 m) below sea level. It is home to many species of plants and animals that have adapted to this harsh desert environment. Some examples include Creosote Bush, Bighorn Sheep, Coyote, and the Death Valley Pupfish, a survivor of much wetter times. Approximately 95% of the park is designated as wilderness. Death Valley National Park is visited annually by more than 770,000 visitors who come to enjoy its diverse geologic features, desert wildlife, historic sites, scenery, clear night skies, and the solitude of the extreme desert environment.

=== Other parks ===
- Alabama Hills Recreation Area
- Last Chance Meadow Research Natural Area
- California Bighorn Sheep Zoological Area

== Demographics ==
Historical population
Census	Pop.	Note	%±
1870	1,956		—
1880	2,928		49.7%
1890	3,544		21.0%
1900	4,377		23.5%
1910	6,974		59.3%
1920	7,031		0.8%
1930	6,555		−6.8%
1940	7,625		16.3%
1950	11,658		52.9%
1960	11,684		0.2%
1970	15,571		33.3%
1980	17,895		14.9%
1990	18,281		2.2%
2000	17,945		−1.8%
2010	18,546		3.3%
2020	19,016		2.5%
2025 (est.)	18,158	▼	−4.5%
U.S. Decennial Census; 1790–1960 1900–1990; 1990–2000 2010 2020

=== 2020 census ===
As of the 2020 census, the county had a population of 19,016 and a median age of 44.8 years. 20.2% of residents were under the age of 18 and 23.7% were 65 years of age or older, and there were 102.3 males for every 100 females overall and 102.6 males for every 100 females age 18 and over.

The racial makeup of the county was 61.8% White, 0.5% Black or African American, 13.0% American Indian and Alaska Native, 1.5% Asian, 0.1% Native Hawaiian and Pacific Islander, 11.9% from some other race, and 11.2% from two or more races, while Hispanic or Latino residents of any race comprised 23.1% of the population.

57.9% of residents lived in urban areas, while 42.1% lived in rural areas.

There were 8,046 households in the county, of which 25.9% had children under the age of 18 living with them and 26.4% had a female householder with no spouse or partner present; about 33.2% of households were made up of individuals and 16.9% had someone 65 years of age or older living alone.

There were 9,469 housing units, of which 15.0% were vacant, and among occupied units 64.3% were owner-occupied while 35.7% were renter-occupied; the homeowner vacancy rate stood at 0.8% and the rental vacancy rate at 6.5%.

=== Racial and ethnic composition ===
Inyo County, California – Racial and ethnic composition Note: the US Census treats Hispanic/Latino as an ethnic category. This table excludes Latinos from the racial categories and assigns them to a separate category. Hispanics/Latinos may be of any race.
Race / Ethnicity (NH = Non-Hispanic)	Pop 1980	Pop 1990	Pop 2000	Pop 2010	Pop 2020	% 1980	% 1990	% 2000	% 2010	% 2020
White alone (NH)	15,194	14,819	13,352	12,296	11,035	84.91%	81.06%	74.41%	66.30%	58.03%
Black or African American alone (NH)	22	71	20	102	85	0.12%	0.39%	0.11%	0.55%	0.45%
Native American or Alaska Native alone (NH)	1,523	1,665	1,678	1,895	2,189	8.51%	9.11%	9.35%	10.22%	11.51%
Asian alone (NH)	72	172	158	229	273	0.40%	0.94%	0.88%	1.23%	1.44%
Native Hawaiian or Pacific Islander alone (NH)	x	x	15	15	13	0.08%	0.08%	0.08%	0.08%	0.07%
Other race alone (NH)	0	18	23	21	87	0.00%	0.10%	0.13%	0.11%	0.46%
Mixed race or Multiracial (NH)	x	x	442	391	935	x	x	2.46%	2.11%	4.92%
Hispanic or Latino (any race)	1,084	1,536	2,257	3,597	4,399	6.06%	8.40%	12.58%	19.40%	23.13%
Total	17,895	18,281	17,945	18,546	19,016	100.00%	100.00%	100.00%	100.00%	100.00%

=== American Community Survey 2025 data ===
The United States Census Bureau estimated that in 2025, Inyo County’s population was 18.158. It was also estimated that the county's population was 56,41% Non-Hispanic White, 25,31% Hispanic or Latino, 0,67% Non-Hispanic Black, 1,87% Asian, 11,52% Native American, 0,10% Pacific Islander, and 4,13% Multiracial.

Total	Population	Percentage
Non-Hispanic White	10.243	56,41%
Hispanic or Latino	4.595	25,31%
Non-Hispanic Black	121	0,67%
Asian	339	1,87%
Native American	2.091	11,52%
Pacific Islander	19	0,10%
Non-Hispanic Multiracial	750	4,13%

=== 2010 Census ===
The 2010 United States census reported that Inyo County had a population of 18,546. The racial makeup of Inyo County was 13,741 (74.1%) White, 109 (0.6%) African American, 2,121 (11.4%) Native American, 243 (1.3%) Asian, 16 (0.1%) Pacific Islander, 1,676 (9.0%) from other races, and 640 (3.5%) from two or more races. Hispanic or Latino of any race were 3,597 persons (19.4%).

Population reported at 2010 United States census
The County	Total; Population	White	African; American	Native; American	Asian	Pacific; Islander	other races	two or more races	Hispanic or Latino (of any race)
Inyo County	18,546	13,741	109	2,121	243	16	1,676	640	3,597
Incorporated city	Total; Population	White	African; American	Native; American	Asian	Pacific; Islander	other races	two or more races	Hispanic or Latino (of any race)
Bishop	3,879	2,867	22	91	61	1	723	114	1,200
Census-designated place	Total; Population	White	African; American	Native; American	Asian	Pacific; Islander	other races	two or more races	Hispanic or Latino (of any race)
Big Pine	1,756	1,192	3	438	13	1	52	57	182
Cartago	92	63	0	7	0	0	11	11	16
Darwin	43	38	0	2	1	1	0	1	2
Dixon Lane-Meadow Creek	2,645	2,287	6	32	47	3	215	55	493
Furnace Creek	24	6	0	16	0	0	0	2	0
Homewood Canyon	44	37	0	0	0	0	5	2	6
Independence	669	493	6	98	8	1	28	35	93
Keeler	66	63	0	0	2	0	0	1	6
Lone Pine	2,035	1,334	6	205	17	1	376	96	694
Mesa	251	220	0	10	3	0	14	4	26
Olancha	192	133	0	4	8	0	38	9	47
Pearsonville	17	16	0	0	0	0	1	0	1
Round Valley	435	333	38	21	3	0	27	13	69
Shoshone	31	28	1	1	0	0	0	1	0
Tecopa	150	119	1	8	2	0	1	19	8
Trona	18	18	0	0	0	0	0	0	0
Valley Wells	0	0	0	0	0	0	0	0	0
West Bishop	2,607	2,373	10	28	45	1	72	78	261
Wilkerson	563	524	0	13	5	1	5	15	53
Other unincorporated areas	Total; Population	White	African; American	Native; American	Asian	Pacific; Islander	other races	two or more races	Hispanic or Latino (of any race)
All others not CDPs (combined)	3,029	1,597	16	1,147	28	6	108	127	440

== Politics ==
=== Voter registration ===
Population and registered voters
Total population	18,457	
Registered voters (Note: Percentage of registered voters with respect to total population. Percentages of party members with respect to registered voters follow.)	9,922	53.8%
Democratic	3,066	30.9%
Republican	4,271	43.0%
Democratic–Republican spread	-1,205	-12.1%
American Independent	414	4.2%
Green	88	0.9%
Libertarian	79	0.8%
Peace and Freedom	29	0.3%
Americans Elect	0	0.0%
Other	46	0.5%
No party preference	1,929	19.4%

==== Cities by population and voter registration ====
Cities by population and voter registration
City	Population	Registered voters	Democratic	Republican	D–R spread	Other	No party preference
Bishop	3,839	42.9%	31.4%	40.3%	-8.9%	10.4%	21.7%

=== Overview ===
2022 California Gubernatorial General Election in Inyo County by Consolidated Precinct

Inyo has historically been a strongly Republican county in Presidential and congressional elections. From 1944 to 2016, the only Democrat to win the county (and the last to win a majority of its vote) was Lyndon Johnson in 1964.

However, the county shifted significantly leftward in 2020, narrowly supporting Joe Biden over Donald Trump. As a result, it became one of only two counties that previously voted for Trump by double digits in 2016 to flip to the Democrats, the other being Talbot County, Maryland.

Inyo still leans Republican. It voted Republican in all statewide races held in 2022. It flipped back to voting for Donald Trump in 2024, though by a much smaller margin than Trump had won the county in 2016.

United States presidential election results for Inyo County, California
Year	Republican		Democratic		Third party(ies)	
Year	No.	%	No.	%	No.	%
1880	321	53.95%	274	46.05%	0	0.00%
1884	345	53.41%	283	43.81%	18	2.79%
1888	437	58.66%	273	36.64%	35	4.70%
1892	409	51.13%	266	33.25%	125	15.63%
1896	286	34.01%	532	63.26%	23	2.73%
1900	396	42.35%	505	54.01%	34	3.64%
1904	452	55.73%	231	28.48%	128	15.78%
1908	583	40.94%	618	43.40%	223	15.66%
1912	8	0.49%	806	49.54%	813	49.97%
1916	846	41.96%	966	47.92%	204	10.12%
1920	1,195	57.20%	682	32.65%	212	10.15%
1924	950	47.52%	256	12.81%	793	39.67%
1928	1,206	57.37%	861	40.96%	35	1.67%
1932	698	30.91%	1,459	64.61%	101	4.47%
1936	912	36.47%	1,560	62.38%	29	1.16%
1940	1,483	44.53%	1,820	54.65%	27	0.81%
1944	1,699	50.64%	1,647	49.09%	9	0.27%
1948	2,135	55.79%	1,539	40.21%	153	4.00%
1952	3,819	68.87%	1,698	30.62%	28	0.50%
1956	3,524	66.19%	1,782	33.47%	18	0.34%
1960	2,962	54.65%	2,443	45.07%	15	0.28%
1964	2,751	46.51%	3,161	53.44%	3	0.05%
1968	3,641	54.45%	2,314	34.60%	732	10.95%
1972	4,873	68.07%	2,006	28.02%	280	3.91%
1976	3,905	58.23%	2,635	39.29%	166	2.48%
1980	5,201	64.79%	2,080	25.91%	746	9.29%
1984	5,863	70.32%	2,360	28.30%	115	1.38%
1988	5,042	64.34%	2,653	33.85%	142	1.81%
1992	3,689	43.58%	2,695	31.84%	2,080	24.57%
1996	3,924	51.84%	2,601	34.36%	1,044	13.79%
2000	4,713	60.31%	2,652	33.93%	450	5.76%
2004	5,091	59.09%	3,350	38.88%	175	2.03%
2008	4,523	53.01%	3,743	43.86%	267	3.13%
2012	4,340	54.01%	3,422	42.58%	274	3.41%
2016	4,248	52.54%	3,155	39.02%	683	8.45%
2020	4,620	48.71%	4,634	48.86%	230	2.43%
2024	4,468	49.91%	4,201	46.92%	284	3.17%

In the California State Legislature, Inyo County is in the 4th senatorial district, represented by Republican Marie Alvarado-Gil, and the 8th Assembly district, represented by Republican David Tangipa.

The county is in California's 3rd congressional district, represented by Independent Kevin Kiley.

On November 4, 2008, Inyo County voted 60.6% for Proposition 8 which amended the California Constitution to ban same-sex marriages.

The county was typically Democratic before World War II. Since World War II, the county has been solidly Republican, only voting for Democratic presidential nominees Lyndon Johnson and Joe Biden.

== Crime ==
The following table includes the number of incidents reported and the rate per 1,000 persons for each type of offense.

Population and crime rates
Population	18,457	
Violent crime	80	4.33
Homicide	2	0.11
Forcible rape	11	0.60
Robbery	7	0.38
Aggravated assault	60	3.25
Property crime	154	8.34
Burglary	75	4.06
Larceny-theft (Note: Only larceny-theft cases involving property over $400 in value are reported as property crimes.)	177	9.59
Motor vehicle theft	18	0.98
Arson	1	0.05

=== Cities by population and crime rates ===
Cities by population and crime rates
City	Population	Violent crimes	Violent crime rate per 1,000 persons	Property crimes	Property crime rate per 1,000 persons
Bishop	3,900	16	4.10	137	35.13

== Education ==
PK-12 school districts in Inyo County are:

- Big Pine Unified School District
- Bishop Unified School District - Some areas cover grades PK-12 while others cover grades 9-12 only.
- Death Valley Unified School District
- Lone Pine Unified School District
- Owens Valley Unified School District
- Trona Joint Unified School District

There is also one elementary school district: Round Valley Joint Elementary School District.

Previously Bishop Union Elementary School District and Bishop Union High School District existed.

Deep Springs College is a two-year alternative education college in Deep Springs Valley.

Higher education in Inyo County is provided by the Kern Community College District.

== Notable locations ==
- Mushroom Rock
- Mount Whitney
- Death Valley National Park
- Badwater Basin
- Lake Manly
- Furnace Creek, California (Hottest air temperature ever recorded here in 1913 at 134.6 °F (57.0 °C). In July 1972, a ground temperature of 201 °F (94 °C) was measured in Furnace Creek. This may be the highest natural ground surface temperature ever recorded.)

== Transportation ==
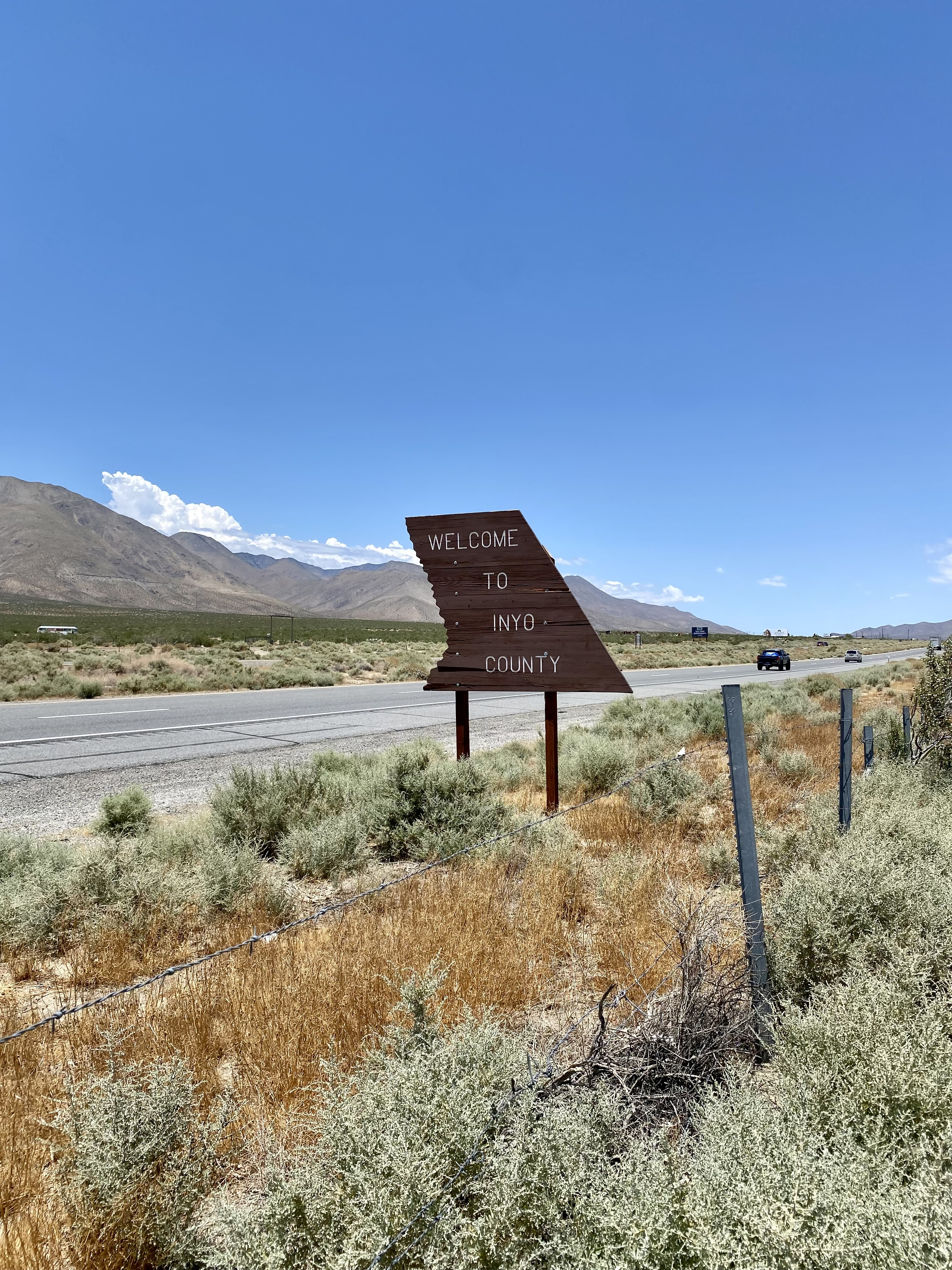
"Welcome to Inyo County" sign along U.S. Route 395

In the 1920s, automobile clubs and nearby towns started to lobby for trans-Sierra highways over Piute Pass and other locations. However, by end of the 1920s, the Forest Service and the Sierra Club decided that roadless wilderness in the Sierra was valuable, and fought the proposal. The Piute Pass proposal faded out by the early 1930s, with the Forest Service proposing a route over Minaret Summit in 1933. The Minaret Summit route was lobbied against by California's Governor Ronald Reagan in 1972. The expansion of the John Muir and Ansel Adams Wildernesses in the 1980s sealed off the Minaret Summit route.

A trans-Sierra route between Porterville and Lone Pine was proposed by local businessmen in 1923. Eventually, a circuitous route across the Sierra was built across the only trans-Sierra route south of Yosemite: Sherman Pass by 1976. That route is Forest Route 22S05 to the west, and Kennedy Meadow Road (County Route J41) and 9-Mile Canyon Road to the east.

=== Major highways ===
- U.S. Route 6
- U.S. Route 395
- State Route 127
- State Route 136
- State Route 168
- State Route 178
- State Route 190

=== Public transportation ===
Eastern Sierra Transit Authority operates intercity bus service along US 395, as well as local services in Bishop. Service extends south to Lancaster (Los Angeles County) and north to Reno, Nevada.

=== Airports ===
Bishop Airport, Independence Airport, Lone Pine Airport and Shoshone Airport are general aviation airports located near their respective cities. Stovepipe Wells Airport and Furnace Creek Airport are located in Death Valley National Park.

== Communities ==
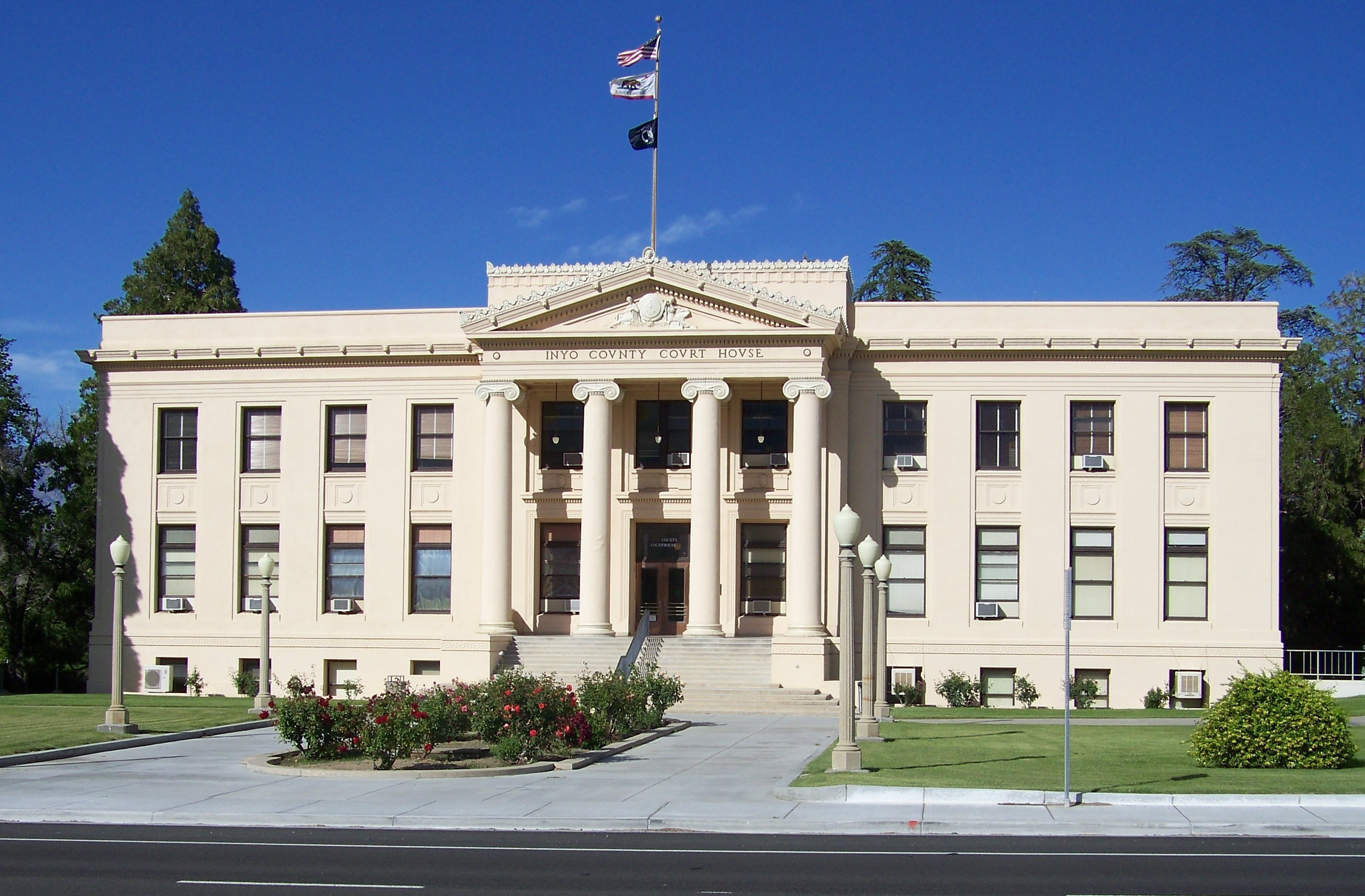
The Inyo County Court House in Independence

=== Cities ===
- Bishop

=== Census-designated places ===
- Big Pine
- Cartago
- Charleston View
- Darwin
- Dixon Lane-Meadow Creek
- Furnace Creek
- Homewood Canyon
- Independence (county seat)
- Keeler
- Lone Pine
- Mesa
- Olancha
- Pearsonville
- Round Valley
- Shoshone
- Tecopa
- Trona
- Valley Wells
- West Bishop
- Wilkerson

=== Other unincorporated communities ===
- Alabama Hills
- Cerro Gordo
- Chicago Valley
- Coso Junction
- Death Valley Junction
- Deep Springs
- Dunmovin
- Haiwee
- Laws
- Panamint Springs
- Sandy Valley
- Stewart Valley

=== Population ranking ===
The population ranking of the following table is based on the 2010 census of Inyo County.

† county seat

Rank	City/Town/etc.	Municipal type	Population (2010 Census)
1	Bishop	City	3,879
2	Dixon Lane-Meadow Creek	CDP	2,645
3	West Bishop	CDP	2,607
4	Lone Pine	CDP	2,035
5	Big Pine	CDP	1,756
6	Bishop Reservation	AIAN	1,588
7	† Independence	CDP	669
8	Wilkerson	CDP	563
9	Big Pine Reservation	AIAN	499
10	Round Valley	CDP	435
11	Mesa	CDP	251
12	Lone Pine Reservation	AIAN	212
13	Olancha	CDP	192
14	Tecopa	CDP	150
15	Fort Independence Reservation	AIAN	93
16	Cartago	CDP	92
17	Keeler	CDP	66
18	Homewood Canyon	CDP	44
19	Darwin	CDP	43
20	Shoshone	CDP	31
t-21	Furnace Creek	CDP	24
t-21	Timbi-Sha Shoshone Reservation	AIAN	24
22	Trona	CDP	18
23	Pearsonville	CDP	17
24	Valley Wells	CDP	0 (permanent)

== See also ==
- National Register of Historic Places listings in Inyo County, California
