= High Desert League (Central Section) =

High school athletic league in California

The High Desert League is a high school athletic conference that is affiliated with the CIF Central Section (CIF-CS). Members are schools in the desert and mountain regions of east Kern County and eastern California. The league and its schools joined the CIF-CS in 2013; previously, they were part of the CIF Southern Section. All league performers are regularly announced.

== Members ==
- Bishop Union High School
- Boron High School
- California City High School
- Desert High School
- Frazier Mountain High School
- Kern Valley High School
- Mammoth High School
- Rosamond High School
