= Inyo County Airport =

Inyo County Airport Manzanar Airport Inyo County Air Force Auxiliary Field
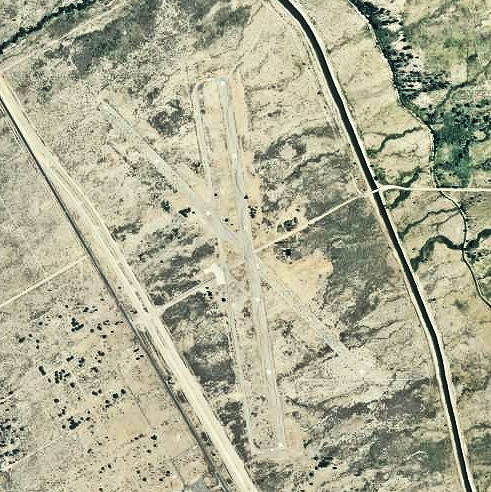
- 2006 USGS airphoto
- IATA: none; ICAO: none

Summary
- Serves: Fresno, California
- Coordinates: 36°44′13″N 118°08′42″W

Map
- Location of Inyo County Airport

Runways
Direction	Length		Surface
Direction	ft	m	Surface
18/35	5,000	1,524	bituminous
13/30	5,000	1,524	bituminous

Inyo County Airport is a closed airport located east of Fresno, California.

== History ==
During World War II, the airport was used by the United States Army Air Forces as an auxiliary training airfield for the flying school at Lone Pine Airport, California.

It was later used as a civil airport. The facility closed sometime in the 1950s. The remains of the runways and ground facilities can be seen in aerial imagery.

== See also ==
- California World War II Army Airfields
