= Independence Airport =

Independence Airport Independence Air Force Auxiliary Field
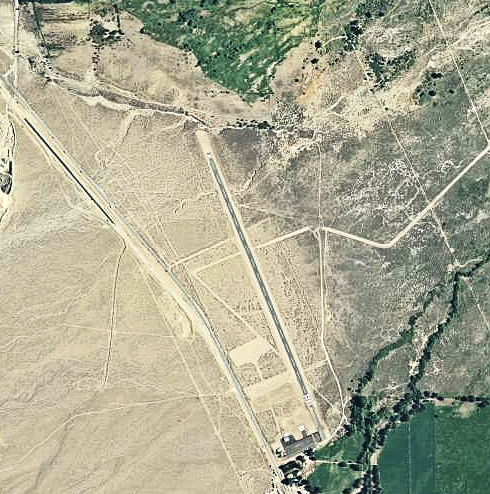
- 2006 USGS airphoto
- IATA: none; ICAO: none; FAA LID: 2O7

Summary
- Airport type: Public
- Location: Independence, California
- Elevation AMSL: 3,900 ft / 1,189 m
- Coordinates: 36°48′49.756″N 118°12′18.34″W

Map
- Location of Independence Airport

Runways
| Direction | Length | | Surface |
| Direction | ft | m | Surface |
|---|---|---|---|
| 14/32 | 3,722 | 1,134 | Asphalt |
| 05/23 | 1,610 | 491 | Dirt |

Independence Airport (FAA LID: 2O7) is a public airport located one mile (1.6 km) north of Independence, serving Inyo County, California, United States. It has two runways and is mostly used for general aviation. The airport is a base for the Bureau of Land Management when fighting wildfires in the Eastern Sierra.

== Facilities ==
Independence Airport has two runways:

- Runway 14/32: 3,722 x 60 ft (1,134 x 18 m), surface: asphalt
- Runway 05/23: 1,610 x 30 ft (491 x 9 m), surface: dirt

== History ==
During World War II, the airport was used by the United States Army Air Forces as an auxiliary training airfield for the flying school at Lone Pine Airport, California.

== See also ==
- California World War II Army Airfields
