= Lone Pine Airport =

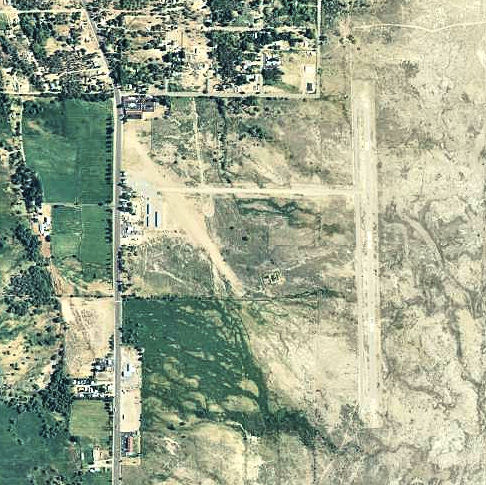
- 2006 USGS airphoto
- IATA: none; ICAO: none; FAA LID: O26

Summary
- Airport type: Public
- Location: Lone Pine, California
- Elevation AMSL: 3,680 ft / 1,122 m
- Coordinates: 36°35′17.760″N 118°03′07.31″W

Map
- Location of Lone Pine Airport

Runways
Direction	Length		Surface
Direction	ft	m	Surface
16/34	4,000	1,219	Asphalt
13G/31G	2,400	732	Dirt

Lone Pine Airport (FAA LID: O26) is a public airport located one mile (1.6 km) southeast of Lone Pine serving Inyo County, California, United States. The airport has two runways and is mostly used for general aviation. Services include air ambulance for the southern part of the county, and search and rescue for Mount Whitney and Death Valley.

Charts: San Francisco; L5.

UNICOM/CTAF frequency: 122.8

== Facilities ==
Lone Pine Airport has two runways:

- Runway 16/34: 4,000 x 60 ft (1,219 x 18 m), surface: asphalt
- Runway 13/31: 2,400 x 100 ft (732 x 30 m), surface: dirt

== World War II ==
During World War II, the airport was used as a contract flying school by the United States Army Air Forces. The school operated between 1942 and 1944. It also controlled several auxiliary airfields:

- Adamson Landing Field 36°15′23″N 117°59′52″W
- Independence Auxiliary Field 36°48′50″N 118°12′15″W
- Inyo County Auxiliary Field 36°44′13″N 118°08′42″W

== See also ==
- California World War II Army Airfields
- 36th Flying Training Wing (World War II)
