= Bishop Unified School District =

School district in California, United States

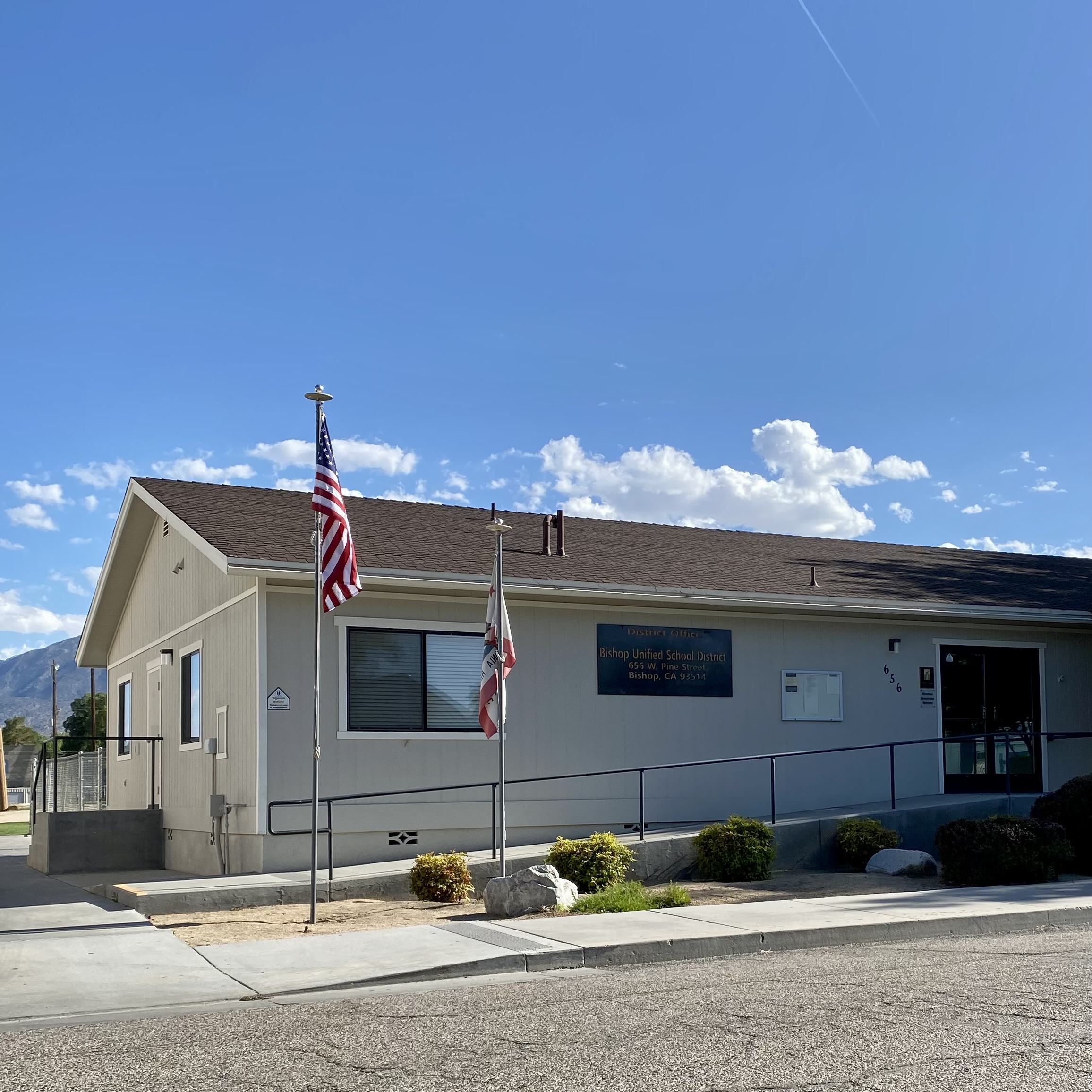

Address
- 656 West Pine Street Bishop, California, 93514; United States

District information
- Type: Public
- Grades: K–12
- NCES District ID: 0601409

Students and staff
- Students: 2,000
- Teachers: 100.3
- Staff: 104.18
- Student–teacher ratio: 19.63

Other information
- Website: www.bishopschools.org

Bishop Unified School District is a school district in Bishop, California. It was formed by the merger of two school districts:

- Bishop Joint Union High School District, which operated
  - Bishop Union High School
  - Palisade Glacier High School
- Bishop Union Elementary School District, which operated
  - Elm Street Elementary School
  - Pine Street Elementary School
  - Home Street Middle Schools

The Bishop USD area that covers PK-12 is entirely in Inyo County; that section includes Bishop, Dixon Lane-Meadow Creek, Wilkerson, and most of West Bishop. Areas in Bishop USD in Inyo County for grades 9-12 only include the rest of West Bishop, as well as Mesa and Round Valley. A portion of the 9-12 area is within Mono County, where it includes Paradise and much of Swall Meadows. The feeder elementary district of the 9-12 area is Round Valley Joint Elementary School District.
