= Shoshone Airport =

- IATA: none; ICAO: none; FAA LID: L61

Summary
- Airport type: Public/civil
- Owner: Inyo County
- Serves: Shoshone, California
- Location: Shoshone, California
- Elevation AMSL: 1,568 ft / 478 m
- Coordinates: 38°40′30″N 121°26′44″W
- Interactive map of Shoshone Airport

Runways
Direction	Length		Surface
Direction	ft	m	Surface
15/33	2,380	725	Asphalt
- Source: Federal Aviation Administration

Shoshone Airport (FAA LID: L61) is a public/civil-use airport located one mile (1.6 km) south of Shoshone, in Inyo County, California, United States.

Although most U.S. airports use the same three-letter location identifier for the FAA and IATA, Shoshone Airport is assigned L61 by the FAA but has no designation from the IATA.

== Facilities ==
Shoshone Airport covers an area of 20 acres (8.1 ha) which contains one asphalt paved runway (15/33) measuring 2,380 ft × 30 ft (725.4 m × 9.1 m).
