= Bishop Union High School =

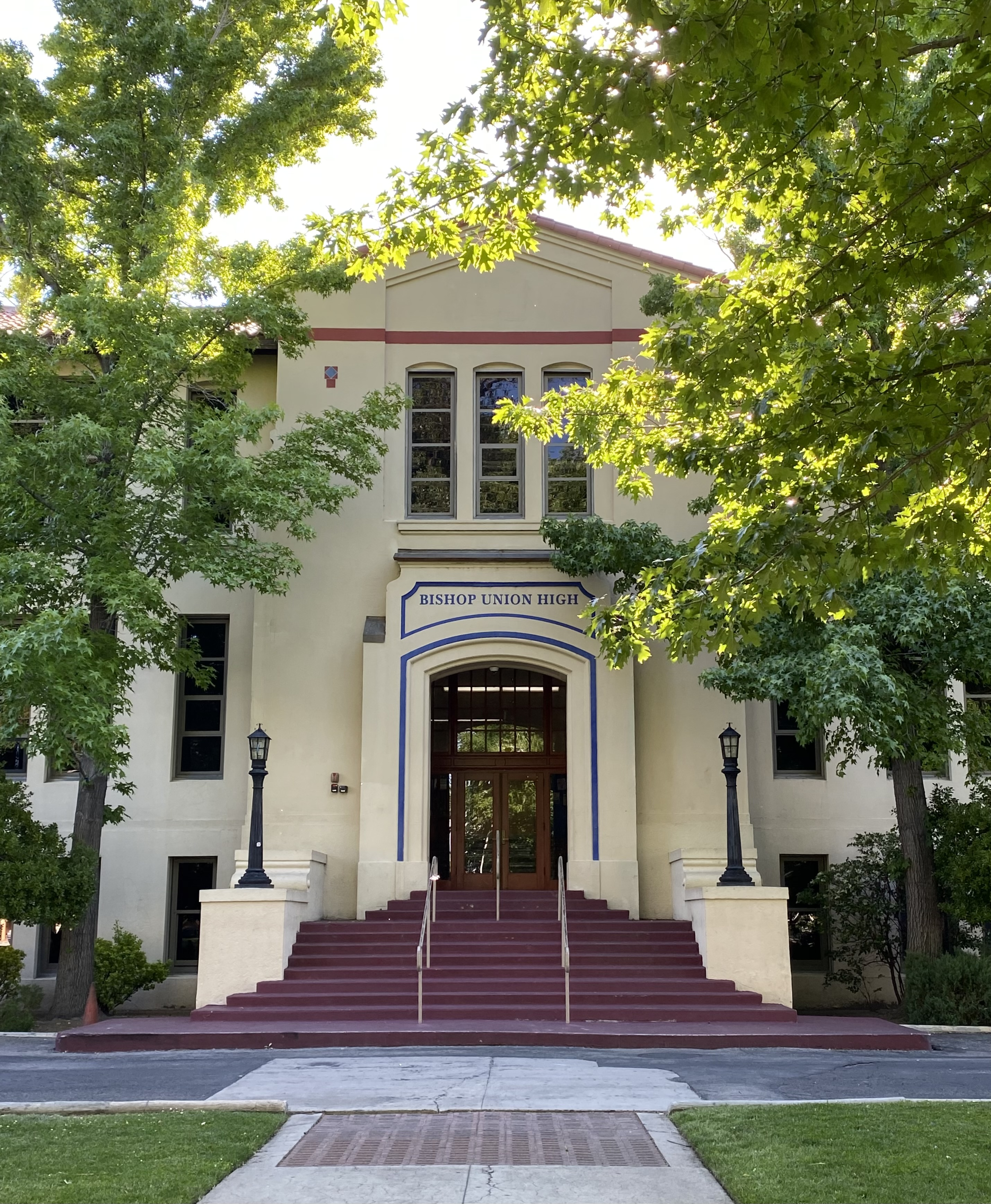

Location
- 301 North Fowler Street; Bishop, Inyo County, California 93514; United States; 37°21′48″N 118°24′00″W

Information
- Established: c,1904
- School district: Bishop Unified School District
- Principal: Erik Forsman
- Teaching staff: 32.50 (FTE)
- Grades: 9th - 12th
- Enrollment: 800
- Student to teacher ratio: 18.86
- Colors: Royal blue, white
- Mascot: Bronco
- Website: www.bishopschools.org/o/buhs%20BUHS

Bishop Union High School (BUHS) is a public high school in Bishop, California. It is part of the Bishop Unified School District. The school is located at 301 North Fowler Street. Bishop Union high school offers students with a wide variety of subjects and electives including numerous hands-on vocational education classes.

Bishop Union High School has a current enrollment of approximately 800 students. Enrollment figures in the late 1970s and into the early 1990s hovered around 1,000 students. The nearby Union Carbide mine closure, coupled with the City of Los Angeles ownership of most of the land around Bishop, therefore controlling community development, caused Bishop schools to suffer a downturn in enrollment in the late 1990s and into the 2000s.

== Athletics ==
The Bishop Union Broncos compete in the High Desert League of the CIF Central Section. Twelve different varsity sports are offered.

In the mid-1990s the Broncos competed in the Southern California Desert Inyo League, which then became the High Desert League.

For several decades, the Broncos competed with rival schools Paraclete (Lancaster, Calif.), Burroughs (Ridgecrest, Calif.) and Tehachapi (Tehachapi, Calif.) in sports. However, enrollments in both Burroughs and Tehachapi's schools grew larger than Bishop and moved on to larger divisions.

In 2010, the Broncos beat the Boron Bobcats 30–22 to win the CIF Southern Section Football Championship.

In 2013, the High Desert League moved from the CIF Southern Section, to the CIF Central Section.

In 2019, the Broncos beat Orosi, CA. 34–7 to win the CIF Central Section Division 6 Championship. The Broncos advanced to the CIF State Bowl game for Division 6A, against Salesian College Preparatory (Richmond, CA.). Bishop Union High School lost the game 37–18.

In 2025, the Broncos once again returned to the CIF Division 5A State Bowl game against Calaveras High School. Bishop Union High School lost that contest 42-21.
