= Pee Wee Lake =

Lake in the state of California, United States

- Location within California Location within the United States
- Location: Inyo County, California
- Coordinates: 37°10′32″N 118°38′09″W
- Surface elevation: 10,800 feet (3,300 m)

Pee Wee Lake is a lake in Inyo County, California, in the United States.

Pee Wee Lake was named for its small size.

== See also ==
- List of lakes in California
