= Adamson Landing Field =

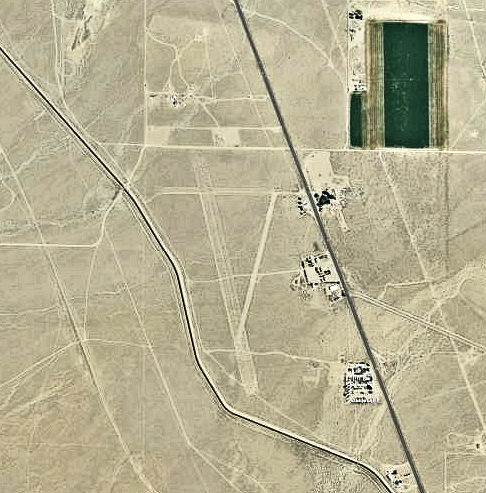
- 2006 USGS airphoto
- IATA: none; ICAO: none

Summary
- Serves: Olancha, California
- Coordinates: 36°15′23″N 117°59′52″W

Map
- Location of Adamson Landing Field

Runways
Direction	Length		Surface
Direction	ft	m	Surface
00/18	2,700	823	Turf
09/27	1,000	305	Turf

Adamson Landing Field is a closed airport located 1.8 mi south-southeast of Olancha, California.

== History ==
During World War II, the airport was used by the United States Army Air Forces as an auxiliary training airfield for the flying school at Lone Pine Airport, California.

The facility closed sometime after the war. The remains of the runways and ground facilities can be seen in aerial imagery.

== See also ==
- California World War II Army Airfields
