= Coso Junction, California =

Unincorporated community in California, United States

Coso Junction
- Unincorporated community
- Location in California Coso Junction (the United States)
- Coordinates: 36°02′42″N 117°56′50″W
- Country: United States
- State: California
- County: Inyo
- Elevation: 3,386 ft (1,032 m)

Coso Junction (Timbisha: Coso, meaning "Fire Stone") is an unincorporated community in Inyo County, California, United States. It is located in Rose Valley, 4.8 km (3 mi) south of Dunmovin and 11.2 km (7 mi) west of Sugarloaf Mountain, near to the US Navy's China Lake Weapons Station, at an elevation of 3386 feet (1032 m).

== History ==
The area has been inhabited by the Coso people traditionally.

The town has been previously called Coso and Gill's Oasis.

The community is the site of frequent earthquakes, with groups of minor earthquakes occurring in 1992, 1996, 1999, 2001, 2003, 2004, and 2011. Floods occurred near the community in 2010 that caused a traffic accident.
