= Saddle Peak Hills Wilderness =

Wilderness area created by the California Desert Protection Act of 1994

- IUCN category Ib (wilderness area)
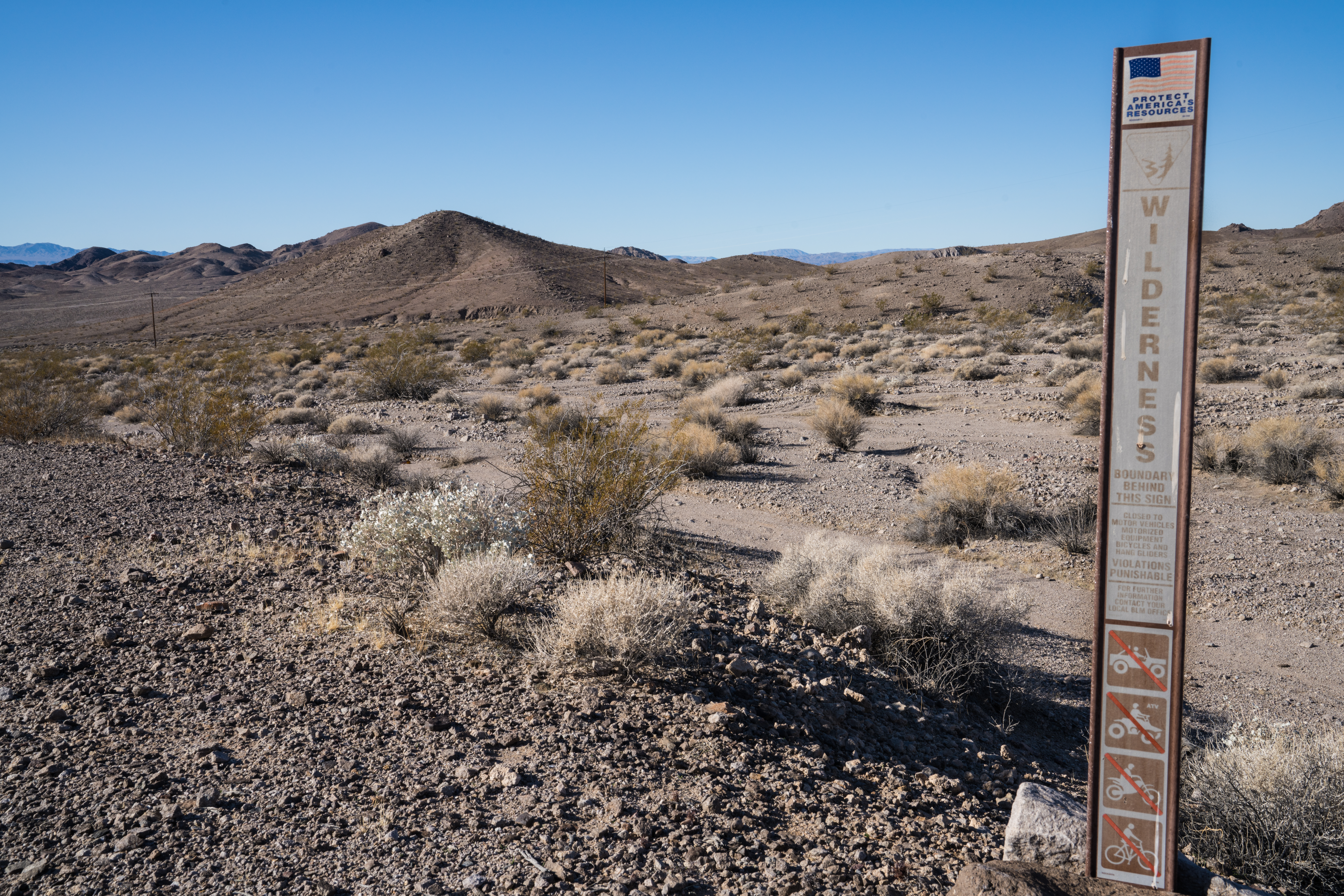

- Location within southern California Location within California Location within the United States
- Interactive map of Saddle Peak Hills Wilderness
- Location: San Bernardino County, California, United States
- Nearest city: Baker, California
- Coordinates: 35°47′03″N 116°20′28″W
- Area: 1,530 acres (6.2 km^{2})
- Established: 1994
- Governing body: Bureau of Land Management

Saddle Peak Hills Wilderness is the smallest designated wilderness area created by the California Desert Protection Act of 1994.

== History ==
A 1980 Bureau of Land Management report recommended the area as unsuitable for wilderness designation, as the mineral resources identified in the study were likely to be commercially viable. These included copper, lead, silver and talc, all of which had been historically extracted in the area.

The area was given wilderness status on 21 October 1994.

== Geology ==
The area contains considerable deposits of talc.

== Ecology ==
=== Vegetation ===
Vegetation consists mostly of creosote bush and allscale scrubs. No sensitive or significant plant species are known to occur within the wilderness area.

=== Wildlife ===
The area is not known to support any listed, sensitive or rare species. (Note: According to 1980 report.)

The sandy substrate in an area of approximately 3 square miles (1,920 acres / 7.8 square kilometres) provides habitat for the Mojave fringe-toed lizard, a highly adapted sand-dwelling species.

== See also ==
- List of U.S. Wilderness Areas
- Wilderness Act
