= Dunmovin, California =

Unincorporated community in California, United States

Dunmovin
- Unincorporated community
- Location in California Dunmovin (the United States)
- Coordinates: 36°05′19″N 117°57′40″W
- Country: United States
- State: California
- County: Inyo
- Elevation: 3,507 ft (1,069 m)

Population (2020)
  - Total: 6

Dunmovin (formerly Cowan Station) is an unincorporated community in Inyo County, California, United States. It is located 4.8 km (3 mi) north of Coso Junction and 21.6 km (13.5 mi) south-southeast of Olancha, at an elevation of 3507 feet (1069 m).

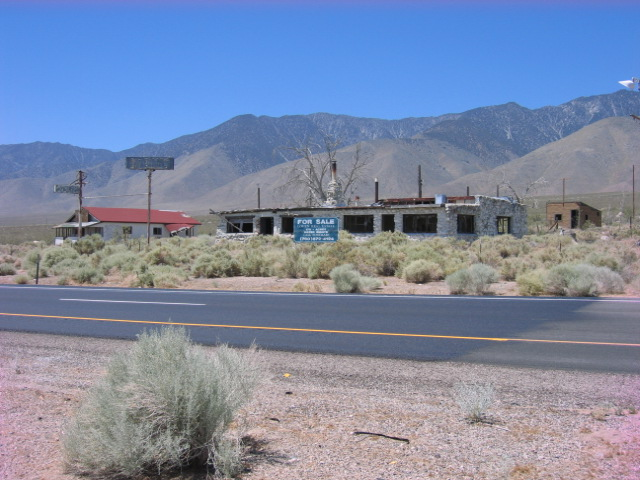
Ruins of Dunmovin

The Current population of Dunmovin as of the 2020 Census is six, within Census Tract 8, block 2274 and Block 2332.

Dunmovin is zoned for Rural Residential High density Retail Commercial on the eastern end of Dunmovin, and Natural Resources, which allows mining, on the western end.

A post office operated at Dunmovin from 1938 to 1941. The place was originally called Cowan Station in honor of homesteader James Cowan. Cowan Station was a freight station for silver ingots being transported from the Cerro Gordo Mines to Los Angeles. When Cowan sold out in 1936, the name was changed to Dunmovin. It was a roadside service station, cafe, and store along U.S. Route 395.
