= Sandy Valley, California =

Unincorporated community in California, United States

Sandy Valley
- Unincorporated community
- Location in California Sandy Valley (the United States)
- Coordinates: 35°48′50.4″N 115°40′40.8″W
- Country: United States
- State: California
- County: Inyo
- Region: Mesquite Valley

Population (2020)
  - Total: 4

Sandy Valley is the southeasternmost unincorporated community, in Inyo County, California, United States, located in the Mesquite Valley. The population in the 2020 for Sandy Valley is in census tract 8, Block 1330–1333 was of 4.

== History ==
In 2011, Sandy Valley was considered as an alternative site for the Hidden Hills Solar Electric Generation System.

== Economy ==
Sandy Valley's economy is predominantly based on the cultivation of marijuana, and turf for residential use.

== Government ==
In the Inyo County board of Supervisors, Sandy Valley is in District 5, represented by Supervisor Matt Kingsley.

In the State Legislator, Sandy Valley is in the 8th senate district, represented by Republican Andreas Borgeas.

== Infrastructure ==
Firefighting services are provided by Southern Inyo Fire Protection District.
