= David Tangipa =

American politician (born 1995)

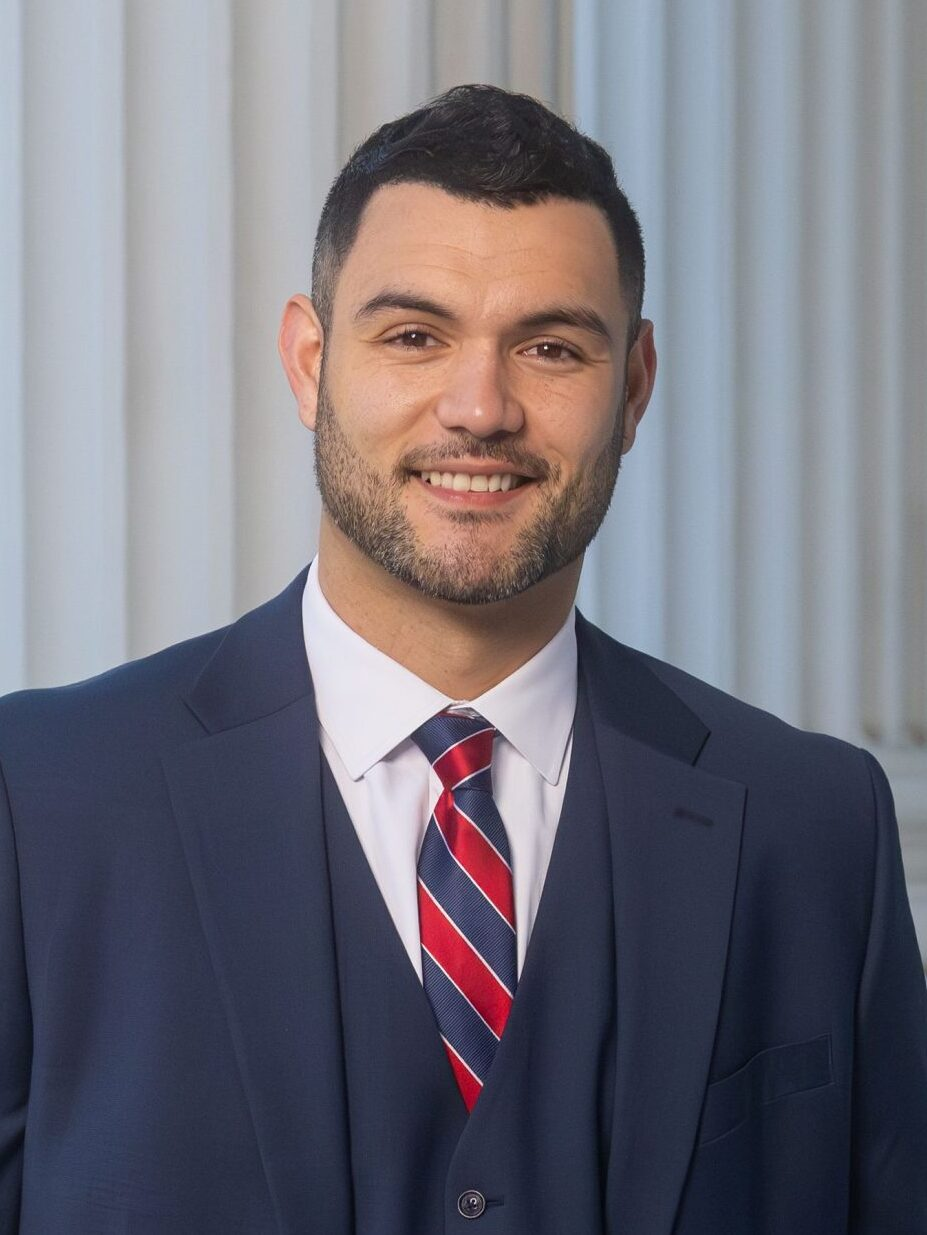
- Official portrait, 2025

Member of the California State Assembly from the 8th district
- Incumbent
- Assumed office December 2, 2024
- Preceded by: Jim Patterson

Personal details
- Born: David Jariustokaeutulelei Tangipa; December 9, 1995 (age 30) Sacramento, California, U.S.
- Party: Republican
- Education: California State University, Fresno (BS, MBA)
- Football career

Profile
- Position: Tight end
- Class: 20

Awards and highlights
- Fresno State Bulldogs

David Jariustokaeutulelei Tangipa (born December 9, 1995) is an American businessman, former college football player, and politician who is a member of the California State Assembly from the 8th district.

== Early life and education ==
Tangipa was born and raised in Sacramento, California to a military veteran father and Tongan mother. He attended California State University, Fresno, where he played tight end for the Bulldogs and earned a Bachelor of Science in political science and criminology as well as a Master of Business Administration.

== Career ==
=== Football ===
Tangipa played on the Fresno State Bulldogs football team as a tight end.

=== Politics ===
Tangipa worked as a field representative for Fresno County Supervisor Nathan Magsig.

Following incumbent Jim Patterson's retirement, Tangipa ran for the California State Assembly in the 8th district in 2024. Patterson endorsed his candidacy. He advanced to the general election with fellow Republican former U.S. Representative George Radanovich, ultimately defeating him.

== California State Assembly ==
In 2025, the California State Assembly and State Senate passed Tangipa’s legislation, Assembly Bill 377, which was signed into law by California Governor Gavin Newsom. The bill amends the California High-Speed Rail Act to require the High-Speed Rail Authority to submit a detailed funding plan for the Merced-to-Bakersfield segment as part of its 2026 business plan.

Tangipa described the bill as “an important step to make sure Fresno and the Central Valley are not left with an unfinished monument of wasted taxpayer dollars.” The bill passed with bipartisan support, which Tangipa argued was a signal of broader legislative concern over the project's escalating costs and missed deadlines.

== Electoral history ==
2024 California State Assembly 8th district election
Primary election
| Party | Candidate | Votes | % |
|---|---|---|---|
| Republican | George Radanovich | 48,868 | 36.1 |
| Republican | David Tangipa | 42,318 | 31.3 |
| Democratic | Caleb Helsel | 40,089 | 29.6 |
| No party preference | Michael Matheson | 4,097 | 3.0 |
| Total votes | | 135,372 | 100.0 |
General election
| Republican | David Tangipa | 113,407 | 53.7 |
| Republican | George Radanovich | 97,770 | 46.3 |
| Total votes | | 211,177 | 100.0 |
| Republican hold | | | |
