= Inyokern, California =

Inyokern
- Unincorporated Community; Census Designated Place
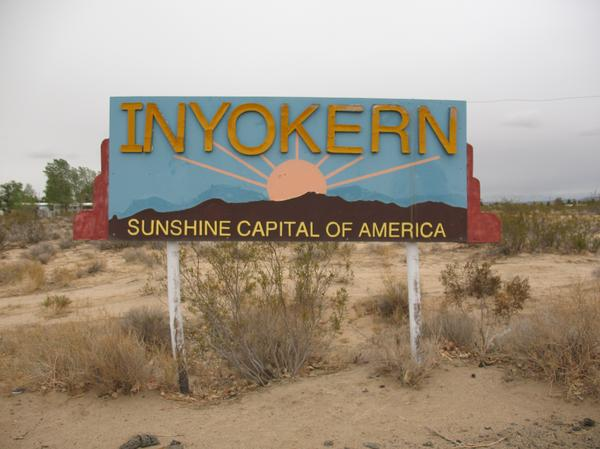
- Inyokern entrance sign
- Nickname: Sunshine Capital of America
- Location in Kern County and the state of California

- Location in the United States Inyokern (California) Inyokern (the United States)
- Coordinates: 35°38′49″N 117°48′45″W
- Country: United States
- State: California
- County: Kern

Government
  - State senator: Shannon Grove (R)
  - Assemblymember: Stan Ellis (R)
  - U. S. rep.: Vince Fong (R)

Area
  - Total: 10.928 sq mi (28.303 km^{2})
  - Land: 10.927 sq mi (28.301 km^{2})
  - Water: 0.00077 sq mi (0.002 km^{2}) 0.01%
- Elevation: 2,434 ft (742 m)

Population (April 1, 2020)
  - Total: 988
  - Density: 90.4/sq mi (34.9/km^{2})
- Time zone: UTC-8 (Pacific)
  - Summer (DST): UTC-7 (PDT)
- ZIP code: 93527
- Area codes: 442/760
- FIPS code: 06-36658
- GNIS feature IDs: 243875, 2408430

Inyokern (formerly Siding 16 and Magnolia) is a census-designated place (CDP) in Kern County, California, United States. Its name derives from its location near the border between Inyo and Kern Counties. Inyokern is located 8 miles (13 km) west of Ridgecrest, at an elevation of 2,434 feet (742 m). It is on the western side of the Indian Wells Valley. The population was 988 in the 2020 census, down from 1,099 in the 2010 census. It was a railroad town established along the Southern Pacific railroad's Lone Pine Branch (now removed) and with WWII became site of the Naval Air Weapons Station China Lake.

It is served by Inyokern Airport.

== Geography ==
Inyokern is located at 35°38′49″N 117°48′45″W approximately 8 miles (13 km) west of Ridgecrest, at an elevation of 2,434 feet (742 m). It is on the western side of the Indian Wells Valley, with the eastern slopes of the Sierra Nevada rising to the west.

It is on U.S. Route 395, the main north–south artery connecting the Inland Empire to Reno, Nevada. US 395 also connects Inyokern to Los Angeles via State Route 14 through Palmdale.

State Route 178, the main east–west artery, connects Inyokern to Bakersfield, the county seat, via Lake Isabella in the west, and to Death Valley via Ridgecrest in the east.

According to the United States Census Bureau, the CDP has a total area of 10.9 square miles (28 km^{2}), over 99% of which is land.

== Demographics ==
Historical population
Census	Pop.	Note	%±
2000	984		—
2010	1,099		11.7%
2020	988		−10.1%
U.S. Decennial Census; 1860–1870 1880-1890; 1900 1910 1920; 1930 1940 1950; 1960 1970 1980; 1990 2000 2010; 2020

Inyokern first appeared as a census designated place in the 2000 U.S. census.

=== 2020 ===
Inyokern CDP, California – Racial and ethnic composition Note: the US Census treats Hispanic/Latino as an ethnic category. This table excludes Latinos from the racial categories and assigns them to a separate category. Hispanics/Latinos may be of any race.
Race / Ethnicity (NH = Non-Hispanic)	Pop 2000	Pop 2010	Pop 2020	% 2000	% 2010	% 2020
White alone (NH)	825	886	667	83.84%	80.62%	67.51%
Black or African American alone (NH)	4	14	9	0.41%	1.27%	0.91%
Native American or Alaska Native alone (NH)	36	16	20	3.66%	1.46%	2.02%
Asian alone (NH)	22	25	27	2.24%	2.27%	2.73%
Native Hawaiian or Pacific Islander alone (NH)	0	2	1	0.00%	0.18%	0.10%
Other race alone (NH)	1	0	5	0.10%	0.00%	0.51%
Mixed race or Multiracial (NH)	32	40	101	3.25%	3.64%	10.22%
Hispanic or Latino (any race)	64	116	158	6.50%	10.56%	15.99%
Total	984	1,099	988	100.00%	100.00%	100.00%

The 2020 United States census reported that Inyokern had a population of 988. The population density was 90.4 inhabitants per square mile (34.9/km^{2}). The racial makeup of Inyokern was 718 (72.7%) White, 9 (0.9%) African American, 27 (2.7%) Native American, 27 (2.7%) Asian, 1 (0.1%) Pacific Islander, 58 (5.9%) from other races, and 148 (15.0%) from two or more races. Hispanic or Latino of any race were 158 persons (16.0%).

The reported population did not entirely live in households. A few homeless people use "third sagebrush on the right on any dirt road." However, there were 441 households, out of which 92 (20.9%) had children under the age of 18 living in them, 204 (46.3%) were married-couple households, 36 (8.2%) were cohabiting couple households, 98 (22.2%) had a female householder with no partner present, and 103 (23.4%) had a male householder with no partner present. 133 households (30.2%) were one person, and 72 (16.3%) were one person aged 65 or older. The average household size was 2.24. There were 279 families (63.3% of all households).

The age distribution was 191 people (19.3%) under the age of 18, 49 people (5.0%) aged 18 to 24, 195 people (19.7%) aged 25 to 44, 325 people (32.9%) aged 45 to 64, and 228 people (23.1%) who were 65 years of age or older. The median age was 51.5 years. For every 100 females, there were 102.0 males.

There were 498 housing units at an average density of 45.6 units per square mile (17.6 units/km^{2}), of which 441 (88.6%) were occupied. Of these, 348 (78.9%) were owner-occupied, and 93 (21.1%) were occupied by renters.

=== 2010 ===
The 2010 United States census reported that Inyokern had a population of 1,099. The population density was 100.7 inhabitants per square mile (38.9/km^{2}). The racial makeup of Inyokern was 930 (84.6%) White, 14 (1.3%) African American, 24 (2.2%) Native American, 25 (2.3%) Asian, 2 (0.2%) Pacific Islander, 49 (4.5%) from other races, and 55 (5.0%) from two or more races. Hispanic or Latino of any race were 116 persons (10.6%).

The Census reported that 1,099 people (100% of the population) lived in households, 0 (0%) lived in non-institutionalized group quarters, and 0 (0%) were institutionalized.

There were 484 households, out of which 111 (22.9%) had children under the age of 18 living in them, 219 (45.2%) were opposite-sex married couples living together, 38 (7.9%) had a female householder with no husband present, 21 (4.3%) had a male householder with no wife present. There were 29 (6.0%) unmarried opposite-sex partnerships, and 4 (0.8%) same-sex married couples or partnerships. 179 households (37.0%) were made up of individuals, and 73 (15.1%) had someone living alone who was 65 years of age or older. The average household size was 2.27. There were 278 families (57.4% of all households); the average family size was 3.01.

The population was spread out, with 222 people (20.2%) under the age of 18, 74 people (6.7%) aged 18 to 24, 201 people (18.3%) aged 25 to 44, 406 people (36.9%) aged 45 to 64, and 196 people (17.8%) who were 65 years of age or older. The median age was 48.2 years. For every 100 females, there were 108.5 males. For every 100 females age 18 and over, there were 109.8 males.

There were 537 housing units at an average density of 49.2 per square mile (19.0/km^{2}), of which 355 (73.3%) were owner-occupied, and 129 (26.7%) were occupied by renters. The homeowner vacancy rate was 1.9%; the rental vacancy rate was 5.7%. 776 people (70.6% of the population) lived in owner-occupied housing units and 323 people (29.4%) lived in rental housing units.

== Climate ==
The climate of Inyokern, California, is predominantly influenced by its high desert location. The climate is characterized by hot days and cool nights with extremely arid conditions prevailing throughout the summer months. The mean annual temperature for the Inyokern area is 70 °F (21 °C). Wide annual temperature fluctuations occur from a high of 118 °F (48 °C) to a low of 8 °F (−13 °C).

January is the coolest month with an average maximum temperature of 47 °F (8 °C) and an average minimum temperature of 22 °F (−6 °C). The all-time minimum temperature of 1 °F (−17.2 °C) was recorded on January 13, 1963. Inyokern is in a desert, with an average of less than 5 inches (130 mm) of "equivalent rainfall" per year, which includes less than 2 inches (5.1 cm) of snow.

July is the hottest month with an average maximum temperature of 108 °F (42 °C) and an average minimum temperature of 80 °F (27 °C). The all-time maximum temperature of 119 °F (48 °C) was recorded on July 30, 1972.

Climate data for Inyokern, California, 1991–2020 normals, extremes 1948–2012
Month	Jan	Feb	Mar	Apr	May	Jun	Jul	Aug	Sep	Oct	Nov	Dec	Year
Record high °F (°C)	80 (27)	86 (30)	93 (34)	100 (38)	112 (44)	114 (46)	119 (48)	114 (46)	110 (43)	105 (41)	88 (31)	84 (29)	119 (48)
Mean daily maximum °F (°C)	60.2 (15.7)	64.5 (18.1)	71.7 (22.1)	77.3 (25.2)	86.2 (30.1)	96.1 (35.6)	102.1 (38.9)	101.0 (38.3)	94.3 (34.6)	82.9 (28.3)	68.4 (20.2)	59.1 (15.1)	80.3 (26.9)
Daily mean °F (°C)	46.8 (8.2)	50.1 (10.1)	56.7 (13.7)	62.3 (16.8)	70.2 (21.2)	79.5 (26.4)	85.3 (29.6)	84.0 (28.9)	77.1 (25.1)	66.5 (19.2)	53.9 (12.2)	45.3 (7.4)	64.8 (18.2)
Mean daily minimum °F (°C)	33.4 (0.8)	35.8 (2.1)	41.6 (5.3)	47.3 (8.5)	54.2 (12.3)	62.9 (17.2)	68.4 (20.2)	67.0 (19.4)	59.8 (15.4)	50.0 (10.0)	39.4 (4.1)	31.6 (−0.2)	49.3 (9.6)
Record low °F (°C)	1 (−17)	9 (−13)	15 (−9)	21 (−6)	26 (−3)	38 (3)	46 (8)	45 (7)	35 (2)	20 (−7)	14 (−10)	5 (−15)	1 (−17)
Average precipitation inches (mm)	0.82 (21)	1.16 (29)	0.52 (13)	0.12 (3.0)	0.04 (1.0)	0.06 (1.5)	0.22 (5.6)	0.08 (2.0)	0.18 (4.6)	0.13 (3.3)	0.23 (5.8)	0.71 (18)	4.27 (107.8)
Average snowfall inches (cm)	0.3 (0.76)	0.0 (0.0)	0.0 (0.0)	0.0 (0.0)	0.0 (0.0)	0.0 (0.0)	0.0 (0.0)	0.0 (0.0)	0.0 (0.0)	0.0 (0.0)	0.0 (0.0)	0.2 (0.51)	0.5 (1.27)
Average precipitation days (≥ 0.01 in)	3.2	4.5	3.0	0.8	0.7	0.4	0.6	0.8	0.7	0.8	1.4	2.3	19.2
Average snowy days (≥ 0.1 in)	0.2	0.0	0.0	0.0	0.0	0.0	0.0	0.0	0.0	0.0	0.0	0.1	0.3
Source 1: NOAA
Source 2: xmACIS2

== History ==
Inyokern was founded in the mid-19th century as an agrarian community located in the northernmost corner of the Mojave Desert. It expanded during construction of the Owens Valley aqueduct. The first post office opened in 1910.

The Inyokern Elementary School was founded in 1913. The original building was replaced in the mid-1930s by a larger building with a stage and indoor restrooms. This building was demolished in the early 1970s. In the 1930s, half a dozen irrigated farms were scattered around Indian Wells Valley, growing mostly alfalfa and livestock. Community events were held in Inyokern Hall, which still stands.

With the onset of World War II, the US Navy located its new Naval Air Weapons Station China Lake in Inyokern. This accounts for the length of the runways and the size of the county airport. The military base was subsequently moved to the east 12 miles (19 km) and the city of Ridgecrest was established as a commercial support center for that base.

== Present time ==
Today, Inyokern serves as a sparsely populated bedroom community for workers on the base desiring a more rural lifestyle.

The town infrastructure consists of two churches, a post office, a market and gas station, convenience store and gas station, a variety store, hardware store, welding and blacksmith shop, a county park, two restaurants, a motel, an autobody shop, several antique shops and a Senior Citizen's Center.

The town water and sewer system is managed by the Community Services Center. The population of the town peaked circa 1988 following a period of expansion on the naval base, but has dwindled since then, and many properties were abandoned during the military downsizing of the 1990s. Until the 1990s, the main commercial block of the town along highway 178 was a somewhat picturesque street of older buildings constructed of local rock and bricks, including a vintage post office, cafe, three bars, and a small Chinese restaurant. This street is sometimes used in filming Hollywood westerns. The Inyokern airport is used to film commercials.

== Environment ==
Characterized by extreme aridity, Inyokern is situated in a wide valley at the base of the eastern escarpment of the Sierra Nevada mountain range. Rugged mountains more than 9,000 feet (2,700 m) in elevation west of the area create a pronounced rain-shadow effect, resulting in a shrub-steppe habitat zone with annual rainfall of less than 3 inches (76 mm). The flora of the valley floor consists primarily of Creosote Bush (Larrea tridentata), Burrobush (Ambrosia dumosa), and several varieties of native bunch grasses. The transition zone of the nearby foothills also contain mixtures of pinyon pine, Joshua tree forests, and concentrated riparian habitat surrounding the small streams descending from the mountain peaks.

Wildlife ranges from black bear, mountain lion, and whitetail deer in the mountain and transition zones to the kangaroo rat and the endangered desert tortoise on the valley floor. A special note on the local wildlife is the local subspecies of rattlesnake, the Mojave rattlesnake (also called the Mojave green rattlesnake). This snake, which is common in the area, produces pit viper venom common to the general species but also produces a neuro-toxin that paralyzes the victim within 15 minutes. The subspecies is docile, and fatal bites are rare. Indigenous animals that found in the valley floor are kit foxes, coyotes, bobcats, and roadrunners. Bears and mountain lions occasionally descend from the Sierra Nevada Mountains seeking food.

== Attractions ==
As of 2008, Inyokern had the highest insolation of any locale on the North American continent, having over 355 days of sunshine each year.

As of 2018, the town was home to the past and current world champion musical saw players.

The Inyokern Airport has been a popular location for car commercials, with the Sierra Nevada Mountains as a backdrop.

== Transportation ==
Inyokern is located at the junciton of U.S. Route 395 in California, California State Route 14, and California State Route 178. General aviation is served by Inyokern Airport. Public transit is provided by Kern Transit and Eastern Sierra Transit, along with Ridgecrest transit which connects Inyokern to Ridgecrest.

== Churches ==
- Bethel Missionary Baptist Church
- Inyokern Baptist Church
- Inyokern Community Methodist Church

== Media ==
Inyokern is served by two newspapers, The Daily Independent and the News Review, as well as a mixture of local broadcast stations and repeaters from radio and TV stations based in Los Angeles, California. The repeaters are operated by the IWV TV Booster.

== Notable person ==
- Lorien Stern, artist
