= Inyokern Airport =

- IATA: IYK; ICAO: KIYK; FAA LID: IYK

Summary
- Airport type: Public
- Owner: Indian Wells Valley; Airport District
- Serves: Inyokern, California
- Elevation AMSL: 2,457 ft (749 m)
- Coordinates: 35°39′31″N 117°49′46″W
- Website: InyokernAirport.com

Map
- Location of airport in California IYK (the United States)

Runways
Direction	Length		Surface
Direction	ft	m	Surface
15/33	7,100	2,164	Asphalt
2/20	6,275	1,913	Asphalt
10/28	4,150	1,265	Asphalt

Statistics (2021)
- Aircraft operations: 23,000
- Based aircraft: 29
- Sources: airport website and FAA

Inyokern Airport (IATA: IYK, ICAO: KIYK, FAA LID: IYK) is a public use airport located 1 nautical mile (1.9 km; 1.2 mi) northwest of the central business district of Inyokern, in Kern County, California, United States. It is owned by the Indian Wells Valley Airport District and serves the Indian Wells Valley area. The airport is mostly used for general aviation and was previously served by a number of commuter and regional airlines over the years with passenger flights to Los Angeles (LAX).

As per Federal Aviation Administration records, the airport had 11,149 passenger boardings (enplanements) in calendar year 2008, 11,081 enplanements in 2009, and 11,109 in 2010. It is included in the National Plan of Integrated Airport Systems for 2011–2015, which categorized it as a primary commercial service airport (more than 10,000 enplanements per year).

== Airlines and destinations ==
=== Cargo ===
Airlines	Destinations
FedEx Feeder	Ontario

== History ==
=== Historical airline service ===
As early as the mid 1950s, Inyokern had scheduled passenger air service operated by Southwest Airways with Douglas DC-3 aircraft twice a day on weekdays nonstop to Burbank Airport (BUR, now Bob Hope Airport) in the Los Angeles area. According to the March 11, 1954, Southwest Airways system timetable, this DC-3 service was "operated under and subject to terms of U.S. Navy Contract". Southwest Airways then changed its name to Pacific Air Lines, which in 1960 was operating nonstop DC-3 service to Los Angeles International Airport (LAX). By 1964, Pacific was operating Martin 4-0-4 propliners from the airport to LAX. In 1968, Pacific Air Lines merged with Bonanza Air Lines and West Coast Airlines to form Air West, which at this time was operating Fairchild F-27 turboprops from Inyokern to Los Angeles via a stop at Fox Field in Lancaster, CA. Air West then changed its name to Hughes Airwest, which continued to serve the airport with F-27 propjet flights to LAX via Lancaster. In 1968, Cable Commuter Airlines was operating de Havilland Canada DHC-6 Twin Otter turboprops to LAX in competition with Air West.

Following the cessation of service by Hughes Airwest in the early 1970s, a number of commuter and regional airlines served the airport over the years with scheduled passenger flights to Los Angeles International Airport (LAX). Schedules in the Official Airline Guide (OAG) from 1974 through 2007 list flights operated at various times over the years by American Eagle (operated by Wings West Airlines), C&M Airlines, Cable Commuter Airlines, Delta Connection (operated by SkyWest Airlines), Desert Sun Airlines, Golden West Airlines, Indian Wells Airlines, Inland Empire Airlines, Mojave Airlines, and United Express (initially operated by Mesa Airlines and later by SkyWest Airlines). These OAGs also list the various turboprop aircraft types that were operated by most of the above airlines into the airport including the Beechcraft C99 (Desert Sun and Mojave Airlines), the Beechcraft 1900C (Mesa Airlines), the British Aerospace BAe Jetstream 31 (Wings West), the de Havilland Canada DHC-6 Twin Otter (Cable Commuter Airlines and Golden West), the Embraer EMB-120 Brasilia (SkyWest) and the Fairchild Swearingen Metroliner (SkyWest, Wings West and Inland Empire). C&M Airlines and Indian Wells Airlines operated small Cessna prop aircraft. Scheduled passenger airline service ended following the cessation of United Express flights operated by SkyWest in November 2013.

On July 7, 2017, airport officials awarded a contract to Boutique Air to begin daily flights to Los Angeles International Airport starting August 8, 2017. However, on October 12, 2017, the Indian Wells Valley Airport District board of directors voted to terminate its contract with Boutique Air following a 60-day notice. The airport currently does not have any scheduled passenger service, but does have air cargo service.

=== Drag racing ===
The Inyokern Airport Dragstrip opened in 1954, and was the second oldest continuously operating dragstrip in the United States, behind Thornhill Dragstrip in Kenton, Kentucky, which opened in 1953. The drag strip closed during the 2005 season due to new Federal Aviation Administration regulations.

=== Soaring ===
Beginning in the 1950s, regular glider records were set out of Inyokern in various sources of lift. Due to its location on the lee side of the Sierra Nevada mountain range, it is an excellent location for altitude records in wave conditions or distance and speed records in thermal lift. It is a challenging location, as the winds change frequently, but with three long runways pilots generally have a variety of options for launch and landing. Many well known pilots have flown gliders out of Inyokern, including Neil Armstrong, Paul Bikle, and Steve Fossett.

Presently Inyokern Airport is the home to Sierra Soaring Club, which operates a Cessna 182 for towing gliders, a Blanik L-23 for rides and instruction, and a Schweizer 1-35 and Standard Cirrus for wave flights and cross country soaring.

=== Film history ===
In the wake of the drag strip's closing, the airport has been actively promoting its use for film shoots, with the Ridgecrest Regional Film Commission marketing its (Runway 28) as "the region's #1 filming location". A notable example of this new use is a television advertisement titled "Gravity", for the Lexus IS. The airdrop "target" featured in the commercial, where the falling automobile hits the ground, was painted on the old drag strip; however, many of the vehicle shots preceding the car drop actually feature the Lexus rolling down runway 20. Other notable automotive television ads shot here include most spots from Saab's "Born from Jets" campaign, as well as spots for Volkswagen, Volvo, Cadillac, Nissan, Mazda, Toyota, Ford, and Chevrolet, just to name a few. Movies have also utilized the airport for shooting, including the aviation blockbuster Top Gun: Maverick, which used the hangar facility for scenes with Tom Cruise working on a vintage aircraft.

== Facilities and aircraft ==
Inyokern Airport covers an area of 1,640 acres (660 ha) at an elevation of 2,457 feet (749 m) above mean sea level. It has three asphalt paved runways: 15/33 is 7,100 by 75 feet (2,164 by 23 m), 2/20 is 6,275 by 75 feet (1,913 by 23 m), and 10/28 is 4,150 by 75 feet (1,265 by 23 m)

For the 12-month period ending March 22, 2021, the airport had about 33,000 aircraft operations, an average of 90 per day: 81% general aviation, 9% military, 5% air taxi, and 4% scheduled commercial. At that time there were 29 aircraft based at this airport: 25 single-engine and 4 multiengine airplanes.

== World War II ==
During World War II the Inyokern Airport was used by the US Navy's as Harvey Field and opened on May 10, 1944. Harvey Field was also used as Inyokern Auxiliary Field. Naval Ordnance Test Station, Inyokern opened on December 12, 1943 with a 900-square mile test range. Vought F4U Corsair trained at the base. Harvey Field is named after Lieutenant Commander Warren W. Harvey for his work on aviation Ordnance for aircraft. Harvey commanded Fighting Squadron Three (VF-3) before the start of WW2. Started the plans for fighting plane tactics. Harvey Field closed in April 1946. The airstrip was built as an emergency landing field in 1935.

== Airlines and destinations ==
=== Cargo ===
Airlines	Destinations
FedEx Feeder operated by West Air	Ontario
Ameriflight doing business for UPS Airlines	Ontario

== See also ==
- List of airports in Kern County, California
