= Fairmont Butte =

Butte in Los Angeles County, California

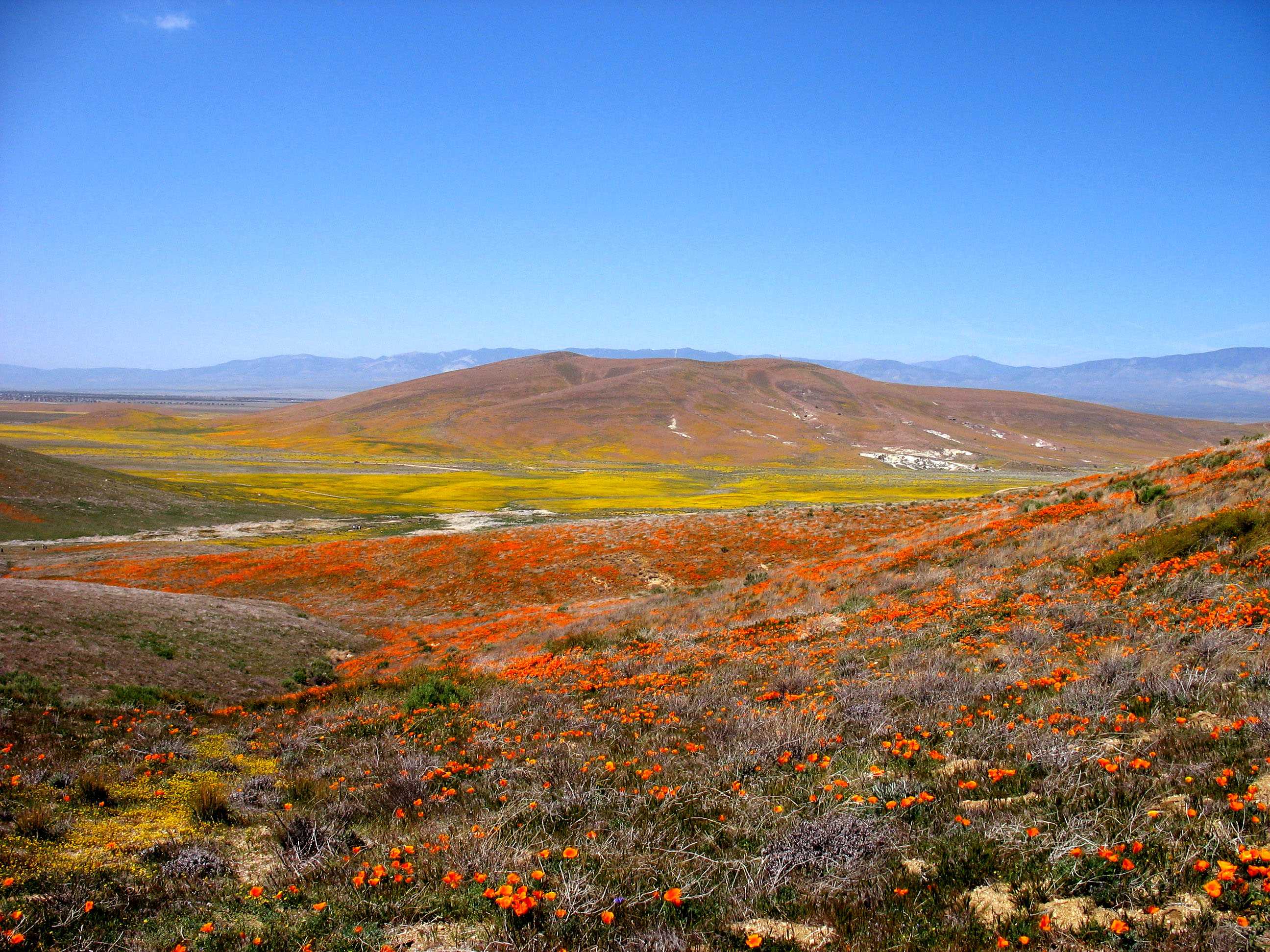

Highest point
- Elevation: 3,130 ft (950 m)
- Prominence: 430 ft (130 m)
- Coordinates: 34°44′56.0″N 118°24′27″W

Geography
- Location: Antelope Valley, Los Angeles County, US

Fairmont Butte is a butte of volcanic origins in the Antelope Valley just west of the City of Lancaster, California in Los Angeles County. Summit elevation is 3,130 feet above sea level. Parts of Fairmont Butte are situated within the boundaries of Antelope Valley California Poppy Reserve.

During construction of the Los Angeles Aqueduct, the City of Los Angeles found deposits of Tuff at Fairmont Butte that closely resembled German Trass and Italian Pozzolana and was an ideal ingredient to blend and use in the production of cement. The City constructed a quarry and regrinding plant at the base of Fairmont Butte to excavate the tuff, grind and blend it with Portland cement which was used in the construction of the aqueduct's Mojave conduit.

== See also ==
- Natural history of the Mojave Desert

== Gallery ==
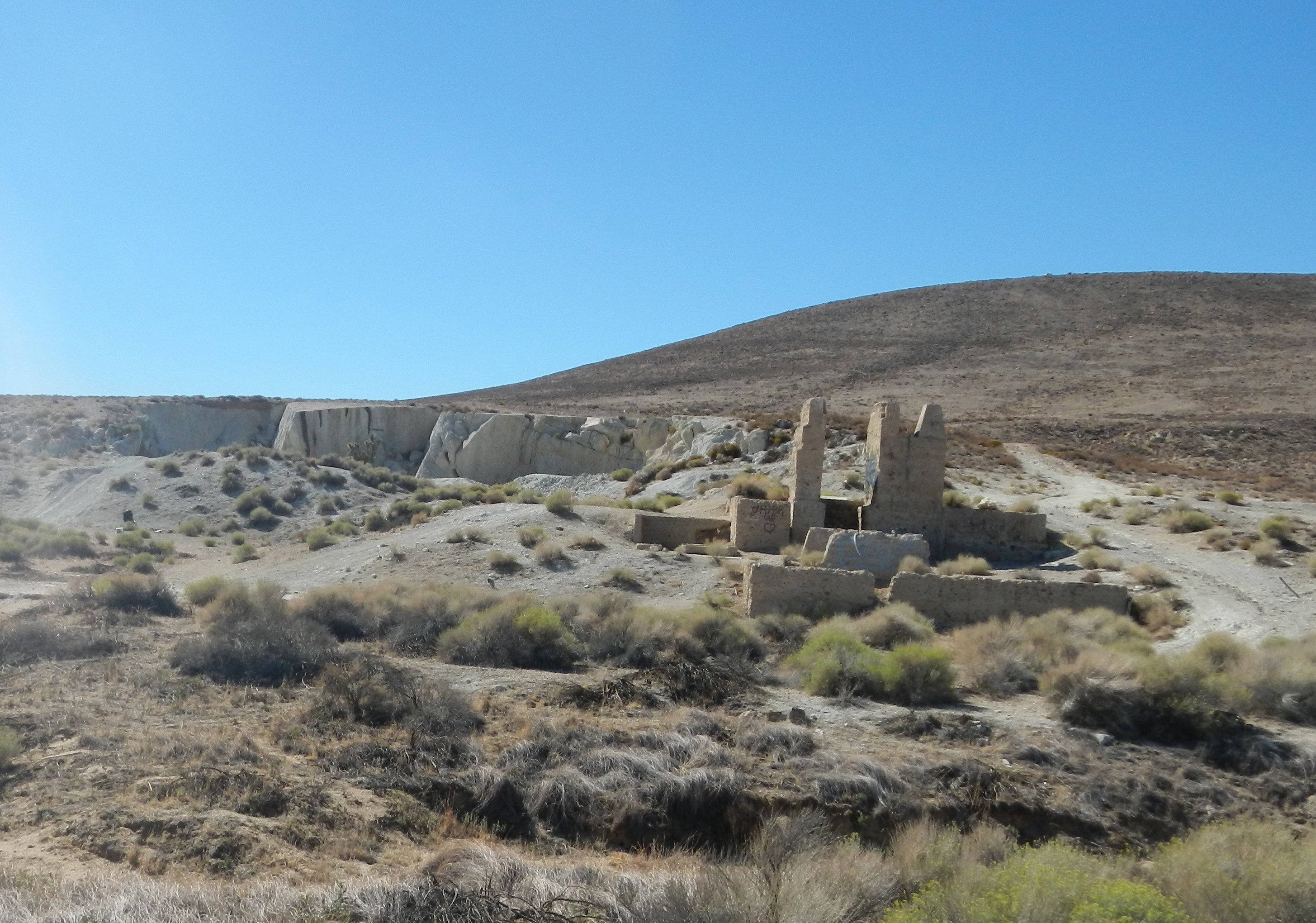
Fairmont Mill ruins on the east side of Fairmont Butte. This mill was one of three that the city ran to produce cement for the Los Angeles Aqueduct.
