= Trona Railway =

Short-line railroad in eastern California

Overview
- Headquarters: Trona, California
- Reporting mark: TRC
- Locale: Mojave Desert, California
- Dates of operation: March 12, 1913–Present

Technical
- Track gauge: 4 ft 8 1/2 in (1,435 mm) standard gauge
- Length: 30.5 miles (49.1 km)

The Trona Railway (reporting mark TRC) is a 30.5 mi (49.1 km) industrial short-line railroad owned by Searles Valley Minerals. The TRC interchanges with the Lone Pine Subdivision of the Union Pacific Railroad (former Southern Pacific Transportation Company) at Searles, California.

== History ==
The railroad was built by the American Trona Company in 1914, to bring the mining company's potash to an interchange with the Southern Pacific Railroad. The company and its Trona Railway has had various subsequent owners, including American Potash & Chemical Corporation, Kerr-McGee Corporation, IMC Global, Sun Capital, LLC, before the ownership of Searles Valley Minerals, Inc. On December 27 2007, Karnavati Holdings, a subsidiary of Nirma Limited, acquired all of Searles Valley Minerals, Inc.

In the 1920s, the Epsom Salts Monorail delivered epsomite to the Trona Railway at Magnesium Siding, about 11 miles (18 km) south of Trona. This unique system extended 28 miles (45 km) eastwards into the Owlshead Mountains, was in use from 1924 to 1926, and was dismantled in the late 1930s.

=== Construction ===
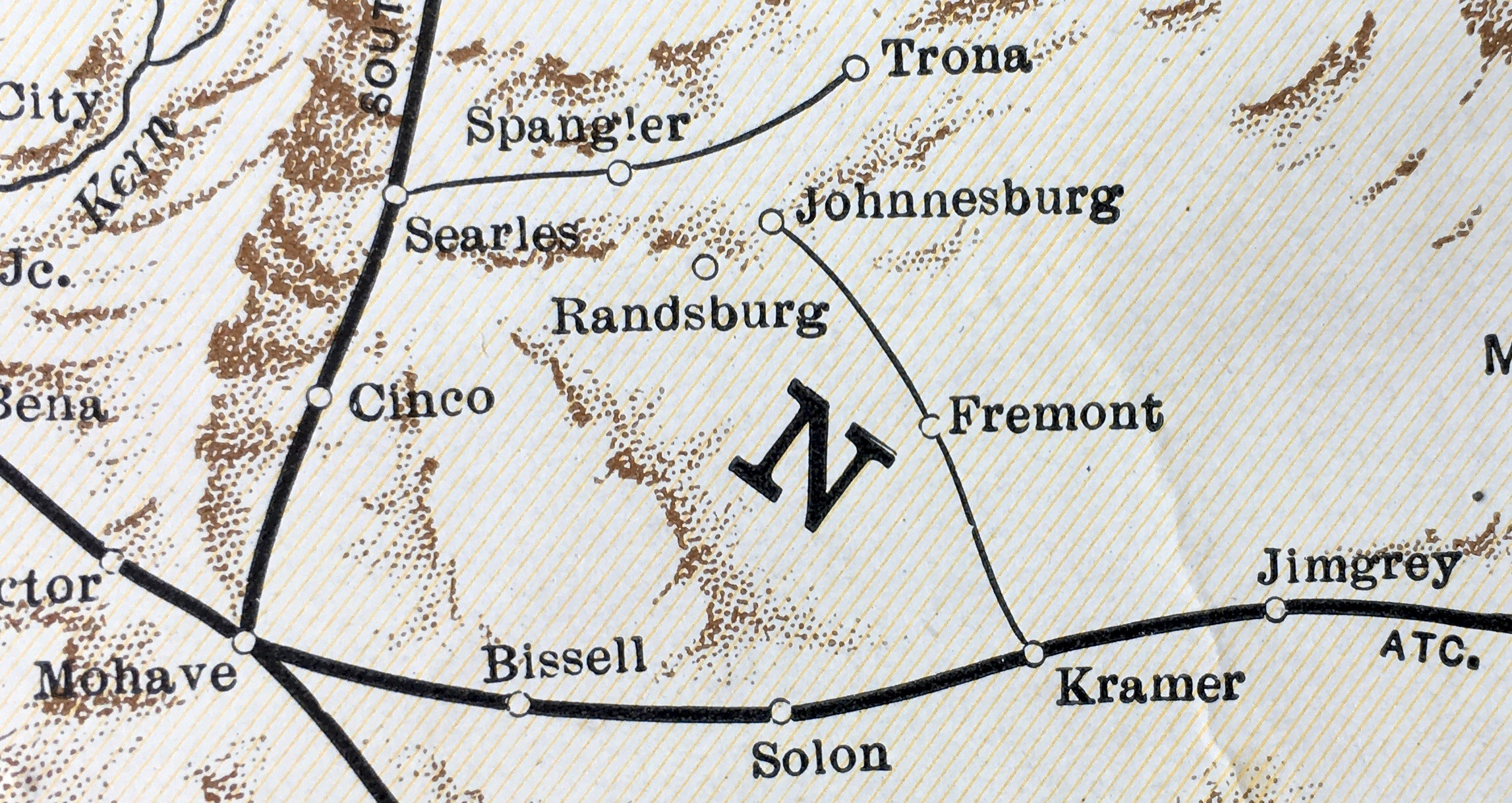
Route in 1930

The idea of building a standard gauge railroad to replace mule-drawn wagons came from Stafford W. Austin, the receiver of the American Trona Corporation. The railroad would connect Searles Valley with a lower cost connection to the markets within the United States and to ocean ports for exports. On September 27, 1913, the wife of Joseph Hutchinson broke ground with an old fashioned plow, to start the construction of Trona Railroad. The work force of 400 included American, Chinese, Greek, Hindu, Mexican, Irish, Norwegian and Swedish workers. They finished the task within 6 months despite battling occasional sandstorms. The construction was event-free, apart from one runaway tank car down the track from Searles Station. This struck the construction train and derailed several cars without causing injuries. The construction of the 31-mile-long (50 km) track was completed by end of March 1914, and the first excursion was conducted in May 1914.

=== World War I ===
In 1914 Searles Lake was one of only two known potash deposits outside of Germany. By 1916 potash was transported via the Trona Railway to farmers, who needed fertilizer, to feed the nation during World War I.

=== Passenger service ===
In addition to carrying inbound fuel oil and outbound fertilizer and chemical products from the new chemical plants in Searles Valley, the Trona Railway also carried passengers to and from Trona. Regular passenger services continued until 1937. A self-propelled coach for pupils of Westend, South Trona and Borosolvay to attend the school in Trona ran up to 1941. This coach was sold in 1941 to the California Western Railroad as their number M-200 for the Skunk Train from Willits, California, to Fort Bragg, California. It was sold to the Niles Canyon Railway in 1975.

=== Three Elephant Route ===
The name Three Elephant Route was created, because many of the railroad's employees were British and did not understand why the company should hold on to its heritage of 20 mule teams. As the story goes, they felt that three elephants could have done the job as well, if not better, than a herd of mules. The slogan was used as a brand and logo, which adorned Trona Railway equipment into the late 1940s.

=== Bankruptcy ===
In June 2026, parent company Searles Valley Minerals filed for Chapter 11 bankruptcy protection in an effort to initiate a court-supervised sale of all of its assets. In September, a sale agreement was reached with 5E Advanced Materials subject to approval by the bankruptcy court and other agencies

== Locomotive fleet ==
=== Steam locomotives ===
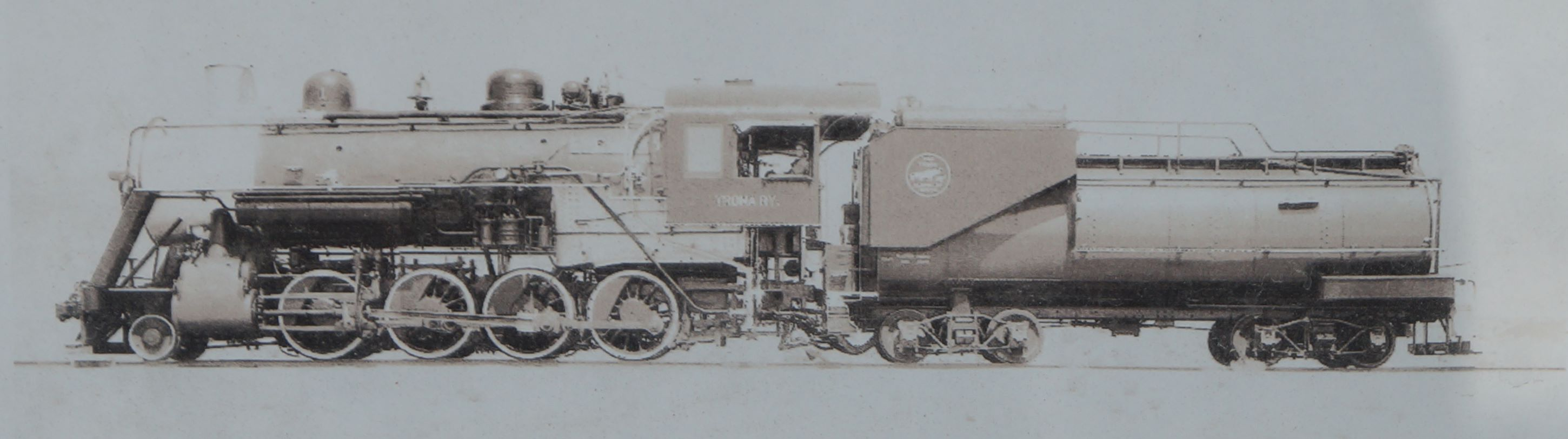
Baldwin steam locomotive of Trona Railway

The operation began with two new oil-fired Baldwin 2-8-0 steam locomotives. The locomotives weighed 104 tonnes each and their boilers produced steam at 200 pounds pressure. When they were coupled together, they had a combined pulling capacity of 500 tons.

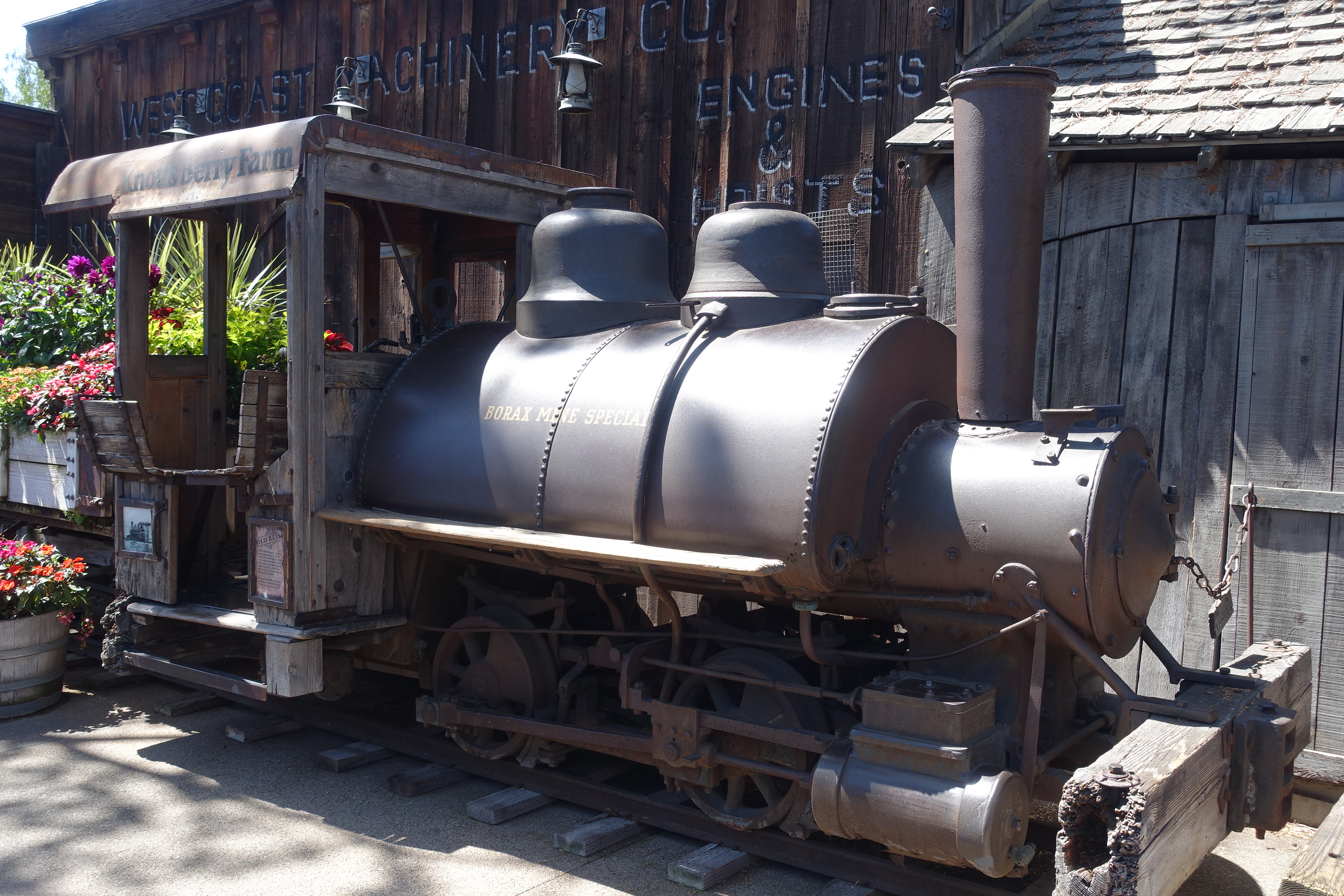
This 24"-gauge engine was owned by the West End Consolidated Mining Company, and used at its facility in Trona, California. The engine is now on display at Knott's Berry Farm in Buena Park, California.

Number	Builder	Type	Date	Works number	Notes
1	Baldwin Locomotive Works	2-8-0	1914	41157	purchased new, scrapped by 1949.
2	Baldwin Locomotive Works	2-8-0	1914	41158	purchased new, scrapped by 1949.
2701	American Locomotive Company	2-8-2	1914	54395	built as Union Pacific Railroad #2701; purchased from Six Companies, Inc. at Hoover Dam about 1936, scrapped by 1949.

=== Diesel locomotives ===
In April 1949 the Trona Railway purchased two new Baldwin DT-6-6-2000 locomotives (numbered 50 and 51) to replace the three steam locomotives that were operating at the time. These weighed 180 tons each and had 2000 hp motors. These locomotives were unique in that they had center cabs, not the traditional cabs in the front.

Locomotive No 52 was a smaller Baldwin AS 616 that only developed 1,600 hp. Eventually, two more AS 616 locomotives were added to the fleet to bring the total to five. A small diesel-electric locomotive called Dinky (Trona railway company #2000) was used for switching in the rail yards. A crew car was used for safety inspections of the rail track and to bring employees to the site of track maintenance.

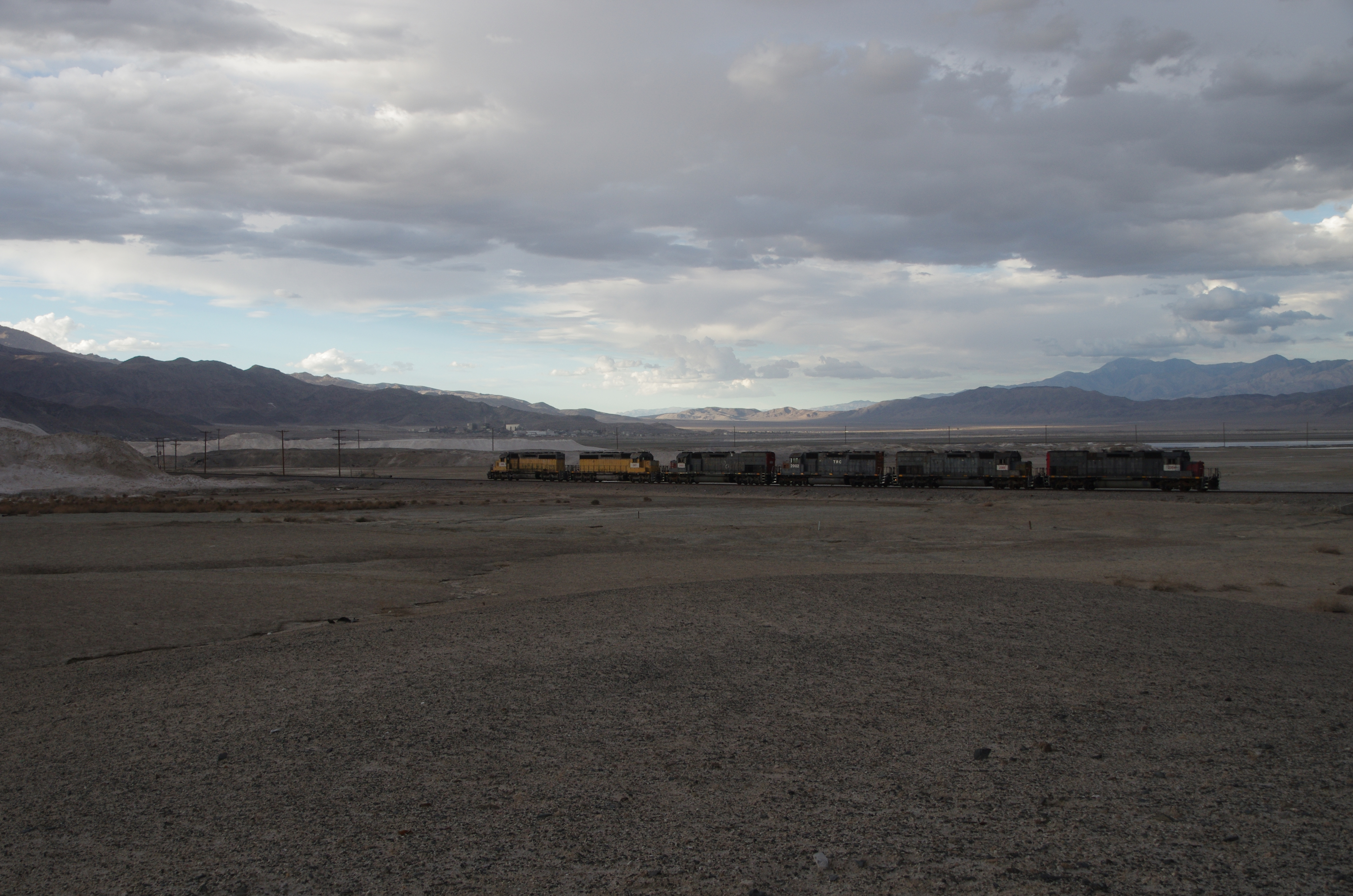
Six of the Diesels heading into Trona, captured from the main road. September 2022

The Baldwins were sold in late 1992, replaced with six leased EMD SD45-2's, all painted in red and silver similar to the earlier Baldwins. These in turn were replaced between 2002 and 2004 by the current fleet (as of February 2021) of two EMD SD40R locomotives, three EMD SD40-2 locomotives, and three EMD SD40T-2 locomotives, all of which remain in the faded color schemes of their former owners, Union Pacific and Southern Pacific. The railroad also owned a fourth SD40-2 numbered #B4316, which is currently serving as a source of spare parts.

One SD40R, #2003, still wears the SP's "Kodachrome" scheme from the attempted merger between the SP and the Atchison, Topeka and Santa Fe Railway. The railroad also owned an EMD SW1200 switcher numbered #2000, and an EMD SD9E numbered #2001. SW1200 #2000 was scrapped in 2021 and SD9E #2001 was scrapped in 2023.

In 2025, as a result of the company downsizing their roster, SD40-2s #2007, #2008 and #2009 were scrapped, and their components were shipped off to South Korea. To replace them, two SD60s, UP #2159, and #2160, along with SD60M #2493 were Purchased from Metro East Industries.

SD40T-2 #2006 was sold to Dieselmotive Company (SPTX) in October 2025 and as of today, is awaiting a prime mover change-out, having been renumbered back to its original SP number, #8505. SD40R #2002 was deactivated in October 2025, but was re-activated as of August 2026. SD40Rs #2003 and #2002 as well the remaining two SD40T-2s #2004 and #2005 are still in operation.

== Operations ==
The main line runs from Trona to the interchange with the Union Pacific's Lone Pine Subdivision at Searles, a distance of 30.6 miles (49.2 km). It has a maximum grade of 1.9% and has gentle curves, which permit a maximum speed of 70 miles per hour (110 km/h).

The railroad handles 18,000 cars annually (1996 estimate). Commodities hauled include:

- Sulfuric acid
- Soda ash
- Potash
- Salt cake
- Borax
- Coal
- Minerals
- Material for the U.S. Naval Air Weapons Station China Lake

== See also ==
- United States Potash Railroad: a potash railroad in New Mexico

== Bibliography ==
- Fickewirth, Alvin A. (1992). California railroads: an encyclopedia of cable car, common carrier, horsecar, industrial, interurban, logging, monorail, motor road, shortlines, streetcar, switching and terminal railroads in California (1851-1992). San Marino, CA: Golden West Books. ISBN 0-87095-106-8.
- Stindt, Fred A. (1996). American Shortline Railway Guide (5th ed.). Waukesha, Wisconsin: Kalmbach Publishing. ISBN 0-89024-290-9.
- Walker, Mike (1997). Steam Powered Video's Comprehensive Railroad Atlas of North America - California and Nevada (Post Merger ed.). Kent, United Kingdom: Steam Powered Publishing. ISBN 1-874745-08-0.
