= Lorien Stern =

American artist

- Education: California College of the Arts
- Occupations: Artist, designer, illustrator
- Known for: Sculpture, paintings

Lorien Stern is an American visual artist, designer, and illustrator. She is known for her whimsical and colorful drawings and ceramic sculptures of animals.

== Work ==
Lorien Stern attended California College of the Arts in Oakland, graduating with a BFA degree in 2013. In an interview with Urban Outfitters, she said she entered art school as a painting major, but became drawn to sculpture after making an urn for her father's ashes. She is best known for her colorful, cartoon-like ceramic shark heads. She has said that making the sharks helps with her fear of them and that a theme in her work is, "finding the harmony in sad and happy things and making scary things approachable.” In 2020, she partnered with Edie Parker, a handbag line, to design several handbags and marijuana accessories, with a share of the proceeds going to a criminal justice organization.

Solo exhibitions of Stern's work have been shown at galleries including Breakfast in Santa Barbara, Hashimoto Contemporary in San Francisco, and Park Life in San Francisco. She also sells clothes and accessories with her artwork.

== Personal life ==
Stern lives and works in a trailer on her family's land in Inyokern, a small town in the Mojave Desert. She formerly lived in Ojai.
