= Jawbone Branch =

The Jawbone Branch, also known as the Lone Pine Branch, is a former Southern Pacific Railroad line in California. It opened in 1910 to aid in construction of the Los Angeles Aqueduct. It connected at Mojave with the railroad's main line, running north through the Owens Valley and connecting with the narrow gauge Carson and Colorado Railroad at Owenyo. Service continues on the south end as far as the interchange with the Trona Railway.

== History ==
The Los Angeles Aqueduct required new construction in remote areas. For the long haul of 130 miles (210 km) from Mojave north, the City of Los Angeles decided that it was necessary to have a railroad. The Owens Valley region was served by a narrow gauge railroad, which came south from the Central Pacific Railroad at Reno and Hazen, but that road did not come south of Owens Valley points. It was believed that building a standard gauge railroad into the area would make the agricultural and mining region tributary to Los Angeles, and would ultimately result in a standard gauge route through to the Central Pacific, which would be to the advantage of transportation possibilities for Southern California. For this reason it was desirable to have this road built by a railroad corporation, rather than the City, as the City would be forced to abandon the line after it was through with it for construction purposes.

Preliminary negotiations were entered into with the Santa Fe Railroad, Southern Pacific Company, and the Western Pacific Railroad, but the only organization that showed interest in the situation was the Southern Pacific Company. The general route of the road necessary for the construction of the Aqueduct was outlined, with a schedule of dates, showing when it would be necessary for the road to be built to certain points in order to facilitate the work, and figures on this basis were obtained from the Southern Pacific Company. The road was considered as extending from Mojave to Olancha, a distance of 100 miles (160 km), by the line of the City's survey, and 118 miles (190 km) by the route proposed by the Southern Pacific Company. The Southern Pacific line made a detour to the east of the Freeman Division, which made it necessary for the City to build and operate six miles (9.7 km) of branch line in the Red Rock Canyon of the Jawbone division. This extra cost of the Red Rock Spur was added, in the comparative estimate, to the figures of the Southern Pacific Company. While the Southern Pacific line in this estimate was considered as stopping at Olancha, where the City road would stop, it would actually continue 20 miles (32 km) beyond Olancha through Lone Pine to Owenyo. The estimated cost of building the road by the City was $1,390,000 in 1907. (Note: equivalent to $48 million in 2025 adjusted for inflation)

Construction of the Jawbone Branch began in February 1908, and it was completed in October 1910. Despite its intended use as a primarily freight link, SP did run passenger trains over the line, with overnight Pullman Company sleeping car service starting in June 1913. The sparsely-populated territory and break of gauge at the north end of the line were not conducive to ridership, though, and passenger services ceased in 1932.

The film Bad Day at Black Rock was shot partially along the Jawbone Branch south of Lone Pine.

The tunnel near Searles was damaged by a fire in February 1981. In order to continue service as the tunnel was being repaired, SP tore up tracks near Owens Lake which were used to build a bypass route. At that point, the company petitioned for abandonment of the Jawbone Branch north of Searles. Freight trains continue to run as far as the interchange with the Trona Railway.
