= Los Angeles Aqueduct =

Water conveyance system in California, United States

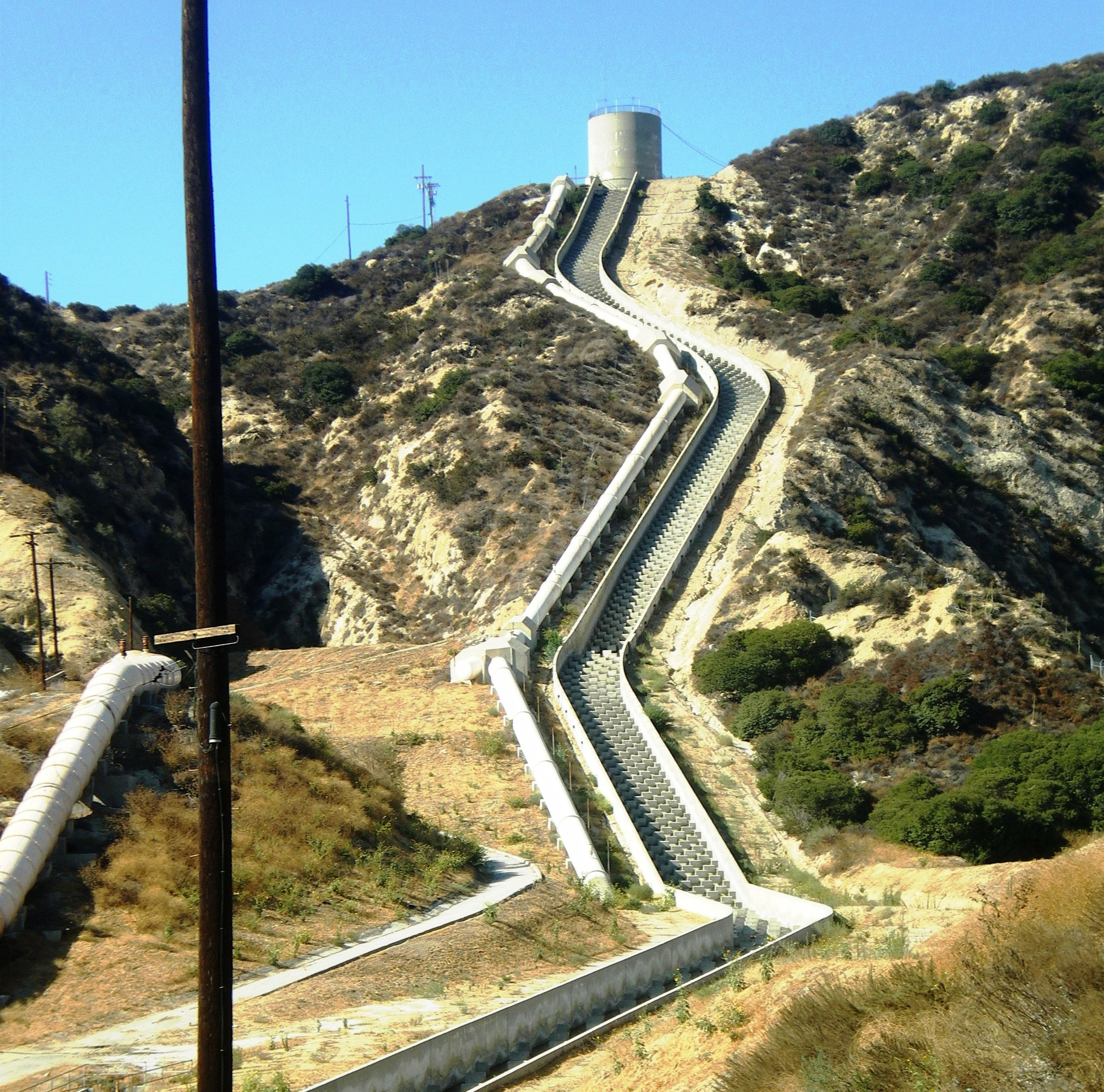
- The Second Los Angeles Aqueduct Cascades, Sylmar
- Coordinates: 36°58′32″N 118°12′37″W
- Begins: First Aqueduct; Owens River, Inyo County; 36.975678°N 118.210541°W; Second Aqueduct; Haiwee Reservoir, Inyo County; 36.182600°N 117.958470°W; Mono Extension; Upper Lee Vining Creek, Mono County; 37.936151°N 119.134426°W
- Ends: First & Second Aqueduct; Upper Van Norman Lake (Los Angeles Reservoir), Granada Hills, Los Angeles; 34.312860°N 118.492988°W; Mono Extension; Owens River, Mono County; 37.756910°N 118.890911°W
- Official name: Los Angeles Aqueduct; Second Los Angeles Aqueduct; Mono Extension
- Maintained by: Los Angeles Department of Water and Power

Characteristics
- Total length: 419 mi (674 km)
- Diameter: 12 ft (3.7 m)
- First section length: 233 mi (375 km)
- Second section length: 137 mi (220 km)
- Capacity: First Aqueduct; 422 cu ft/s (11.9 m^{3}/s); Second Aqueduct; 290 cu ft/s (8.2 m^{3}/s)

History
- Construction start: First Aqueduct; October 1908; Second Aqueduct; September 1965
- Opened: First Aqueduct; November 1913; Second Aqueduct; June 1970

Location
- Interactive map of Los Angeles Aqueduct

The Los Angeles Aqueduct system, comprising the Los Angeles Aqueduct (Owens Valley aqueduct) and the Second Los Angeles Aqueduct, is a water conveyance system, built and operated by the Los Angeles Department of Water and Power under the supervision of the department's Chief Engineer, William Mulholland. The system delivers water from the Owens River in the eastern Sierra Nevada mountains to Los Angeles.

The aqueduct's construction was controversial from the start, as water diversions to Los Angeles eliminated the Owens Valley as a viable farming community. Clauses in the city's charter originally stated that the city could not sell or provide surplus water to any area outside the city, forcing adjacent communities to annex themselves into Los Angeles.

The aqueduct's infrastructure also included the completion of the St. Francis Dam in 1926 to provide storage in case of disruption to the system. The dam's collapse two years later killed at least 431 people, halted the rapid pace of annexation, and eventually led to the formation of the Metropolitan Water District of Southern California to build and operate the Colorado River Aqueduct to bring water from the Colorado River to Los Angeles County.

The continued operation of the Los Angeles Aqueduct has led to public debate, legislation, and court battles over its environmental impacts on Mono Lake and other ecosystems.

== First Los Angeles Aqueduct ==
=== Construction ===
The aqueduct project began in 1905 when the voters of Los Angeles approved a US$1.5 million bond for the "purchase of lands and water and the inauguration of work on the aqueduct". On June 12, 1907, a second bond was passed with a budget of US$24.5 million to fund construction.

Construction began in 1908 and was divided into eleven divisions. The city acquired three limestone quarries, two tufa quarries and it constructed and operated a cement plant in Monolith, California, which could produce 1,200 barrels of Portland cement per day. Regrinding mills were also built and operated by the city at the tufa quarries. To move 14 million ton-miles of freight, the city contracted with Southern Pacific to build a 118-mile (190 km) long railroad from the Monolith mills to Olancha.

The number of men who were on the payroll the first year was 2,629 and this number peaked at 6,060 in May 1909. In 1910, employment dropped to 1,150 due to financial reasons but rebounded later in the year. In 1911 and 1912, employment ranged from 2,800 to 3,800 workers. The number of laborers working on the aqueduct at its peak was 3,900. In 1913, the City of Los Angeles completed construction of the first Los Angeles Aqueduct.

=== Route ===
The aqueduct as originally constructed consisted of six storage reservoirs and 215 mi (346 km) of conduit. Beginning 3.5 mi (5.6 km) north of Blackrock (Inyo County), the aqueduct diverts the Owens River into an unlined canal to begin its 233 mi (375 km) journey south to the Lower San Fernando Reservoir. This reservoir was later renamed the Lower Van Norman Reservoir.

The original project consisted of 24 mi (39 km) of open unlined canal, 37 mi (60 km) of lined open canal, 97 mi (156 km) of covered concrete conduit, 43 mi (69 km) of concrete tunnels, 12.00 mi (19.31 km) steel siphons, 120 mi (190 km) of railroad track, two hydroelectric plants, three cement plants, 170 mi (270 km) of power lines, 240 mi (390 km) of telephone line, 500 mi (800 km) of roads and was later expanded with the construction of the Mono Extension and the Second Los Angeles Aqueduct.

The aqueduct uses gravity alone to move the water and also uses the water to generate electricity, which makes it cost-efficient to operate.

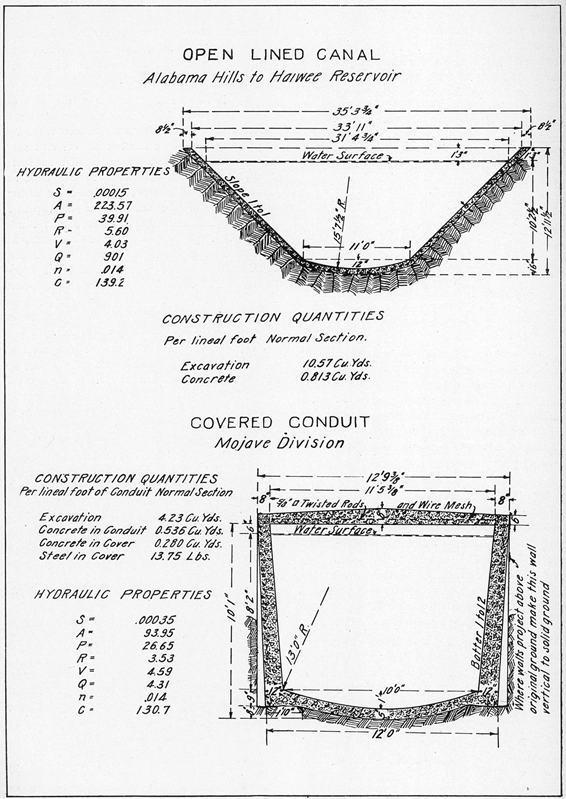
Typical construction view of lined canal and covered concrete conduit.

=== Reactions by impacted communities ===
The construction of the Los Angeles Aqueduct effectively eliminated the Owens Valley as a viable farming community and eventually devastated the Owens Lake ecosystem. A group labeled the "San Fernando Syndicate" – including Fred Eaton, Mulholland, Harrison Otis (the publisher of The Los Angeles Times), Henry Huntington (an executive of the Pacific Electric Railway), and other wealthy individuals – were a group of investors who bought land in the San Fernando Valley allegedly based on inside knowledge that the Los Angeles aqueduct would soon irrigate it and encourage development. Although there is disagreement over the actions of the "syndicate" as to whether they were a "diabolical" cabal or only a group that united the Los Angeles business community behind supporting the aqueduct, Eaton, Mulholland and others connected with the project have long been accused of using deceptive tactics and underhanded methods to obtain water rights and block the Bureau of Reclamation from building water infrastructure for the residents in Owens Valley, and creating a false sense of urgency around the completion of the aqueduct for Los Angeles residents. By the 1920s, the aggressive pursuit of water rights and the diversion of the Owens River precipitated the outbreak of violence known as the California water wars. Farmers in Owens Valley, following a series of unmet deadlines from LADWP, attacked infrastructure, dynamiting the aqueduct numerous times, and opened sluice gates to divert the flow of water back into Owens Lake. The lake has never been refilled, and is now maintained with a minimum level of surface water to prevent the introduction of dangerous, toxic lake-floor dust into the local community.

== Mono Basin extension ==
In an effort to find more water, the city of Los Angeles reached farther north. In 1930, Los Angeles voters passed a third US$38.8 million bond to buy land in the Mono Basin and fund the Mono Basin extension. The 105 mi (169 km) extension diverted flows from Rush Creek, Lee Vining Creek, Walker Creek, and Parker Creek that would have flowed into Mono Lake. The construction of the Mono extension consisted of an intake at Lee Vining Creek, the Lee Vining conduit to the Grant Reservoir on Rush Creek, which would have a capacity of 48,000 acre⋅ft (59,000,000 m^{3}), the 12.7 mi (20.4 km) Mono Craters Tunnel to the Owens River, and a second reservoir, later named Crowley Lake with a capacity of 183,465 acre⋅ft (226,301,000 m^{3}) in Long Valley at the head of the Owens River Gorge.

Completed in 1940, diversions began in 1941. The Mono Extension has a design capacity of 400 cu ft/s (11,000 L/s) of flow to the aqueduct. However, the flow was limited to 123 cu ft/s (3,500 L/s) due to the limited downstream capacity of the Los Angeles Aqueduct. Full appropriation of the water could not be met until the second aqueduct was completed in 1970.

=== The Mono extension's impact on Mono Basin and litigation ===
From 1940 to 1970, water exports through the Mono Extension averaged 57,067 acre-feet (70 million cubic meters) per year and peaked at 135,000 acre⋅ft (167 million m^{3}) in 1974. Export licenses granted by the State Water Resources Control Board (SWRCB) in 1974 increased exports to 167,000 acre⋅ft (206 million m^{3}) per year. These export levels severely impacted the region's fish habitat, lake level, and air quality, which led to a series of lawsuits. The results of the litigation culminated with a SWRCB decision to restore fishery protection (stream) flows to specified minimums, and raise Mono Lake to 6,391 feet (1,948 m) above sea level. The agreement limited further exports from the Mono Basin to 16,000 acre⋅ft (19.7 million m^{3}) or less per year during the transition period.

== Second Los Angeles Aqueduct ==
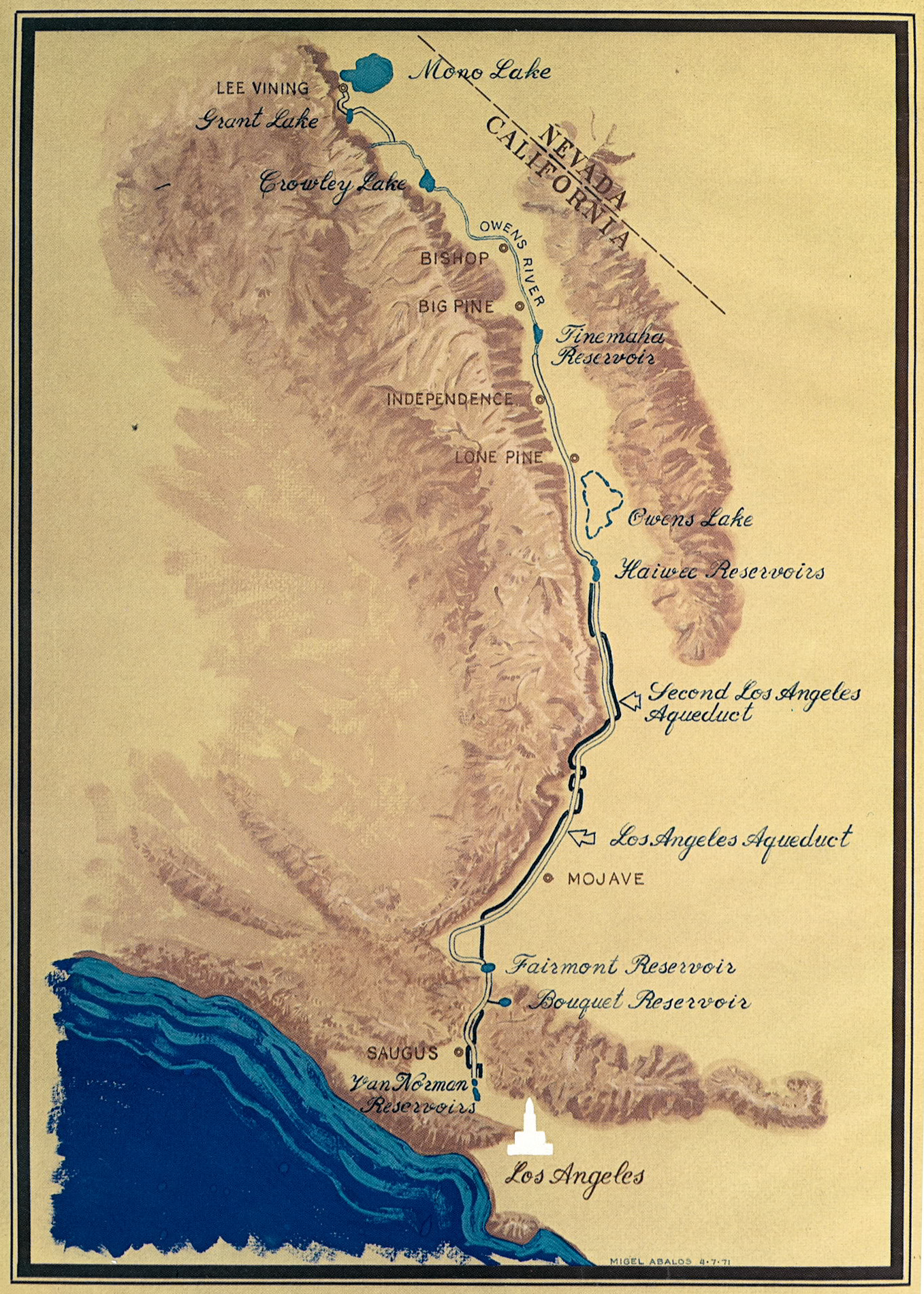
Los Angeles Aqueduct System, 1971

In 1956, the State Department of Water Resources reported that Los Angeles was exporting only 320,000 acre-feet (390 million cubic metres) of water of the 590,000 acre⋅ft (730 million m^{3}) available in the Owens Valley and Mono Basin. Three years later, the State Water Rights Board warned Los Angeles that they could lose rights to the water they were permitted for but not appropriating. Faced with the possible loss of future water supply, Los Angeles began the five-year construction of the aqueduct in 1965 at a cost US$89 million. Once the city received diversion permits, water exports jumped in 1970, adding 110,000 AF that year into the aqueduct system. By 1974, exports climbed to 450,000 acre⋅ft (560 million m^{3}) per year. Unlike the First Aqueduct which was built entirely by Public Works, the Second Los Angeles Aqueduct was primarily built on contract by various private construction firms including R.A. Wattson Co., Winston Bros., and the Griffith Co. The Los Angeles Department of Water and Power managed the project and performed some finishing construction on the Mojave conduit and Jawbone & Dove Spring pipelines.

=== Route ===
The 137-mile-long (220 km) aqueduct was designed to flow 290 cu ft/s (8,200 L/s) and begins at the Merritt Diversion Structure at the junction of the North and South Haiwee Reservoirs, south of Owens Lake, and runs roughly parallel to the first aqueduct. Water flows entirely by gravity from an elevation of 3,760 feet (1,150 m) at the Haiwee Reservoir through two power drops to an elevation of 1,200 ft (370 m) at the Upper Van Norman Reservoir.

The Second Aqueduct was not built as a single contiguous conduit. For design and construction purposes the aqueduct was divided into Northern and Southern sections and the two are connected by the San Francisquito Tunnels, which are part of the First Aqueduct.

The Northern Section carries water starting at the North Haiwee Reservoir through the Haiwee Bypass passing around the South Haiwee Reservoir. The flow then continues 115 miles (185 km) south through a series of pressure pipelines and concrete conduits where it connects with the First Aqueduct at the North Portal of the Elizabeth Tunnel near the Fairmont Reservoir.

The San Francisquito Tunnels (which include the Elizabeth Tunnel) have a flow capacity of 1,000 cu ft/s (28,000 L/s) and are large enough to handle the flow of both aqueducts. Once the combined flow reaches the penstocks above Power Plant #2, water is diverted into the Southern Section of the second aqueduct through the Drinkwater Tunnel to the Drinkwater Reservoir.

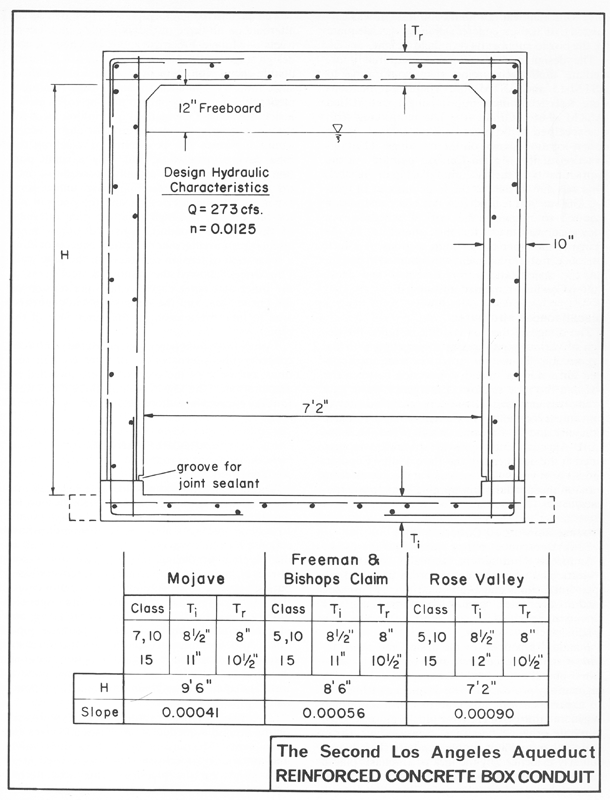
An updated version of the concrete box construction used on the second aqueduct.

The last segment of pipe, known as the Saugus Pipeline, carries water south past Bouquet Canyon, Soledad Canyon and Placerita Canyon in the city of Santa Clarita. From there it roughly parallels Sierra Highway before it enters Magazine Canyon near the Terminal structure and Cascades. Water from the Terminal structure can then flow to either the Cascade or penstock to the Foothill Power Plant and into the Upper Van Norman Reservoir.

In addition to the construction in the Northern and Southern sections, improvements were also made to the lined canal between the Alabama Gates and the North Haiwee Reservoir in the Northern Section that consisted of adding 24 in (610 mm) sidewalls to both sides of the canal and the raising of overcrossings. This work increased the capacity of the lined canal from 710 cu ft/s (20,000 L/s) to 900 cu ft/s (25,000 L/s) cfs.

=== Second aqueduct's impact on the water system ===
The increased flows provided by the second aqueduct lasted only from 1971 through 1988. In 1974 the environmental consequences of the higher exports were first being recognized in the Mono Basin and Owens Valley. This was followed by a series of court ordered restrictions imposed on water exports, which resulted in Los Angeles losing water. In 2005, the Los Angeles Urban Water Management Report reported that 40–50% of the aqueduct's historical supply is now devoted to ecological resources in Mono and Inyo counties.

== Influence on Los Angeles and the county ==
From 1909 to 1928, the city of Los Angeles grew from 61 square miles (160 km^{2}) to 440 square miles (1,100 km^{2}). This was due largely to the aqueduct, and the city's charter which stated that the City of Los Angeles could not sell or provide surplus water to any area outside the city. Outlying areas relied on wells and creeks for water and, as they dried up, the people in those areas realized that if they were going to be able to continue irrigating their farms and provide themselves domestic water, they would have to annex themselves to the City of Los Angeles.

Growth was so rapid that it appeared as if the city of Los Angeles would eventually assume the size of the entire county. William Mulholland continued adding capacity to the aqueduct, building the St. Francis Dam that would impound water creating the San Francisquito Reservoir, filed for additional water from the Colorado River, and began sending engineers and miners to clear the heading at the San Jacinto Tunnel that he knew was key to the construction of the Colorado River Aqueduct.

The aqueduct's water provided developers with the resources to quickly develop the San Fernando Valley and Los Angeles through World War II. Mulholland's role in the vision and completion of the aqueduct and the growth of Los Angeles into a large metropolis is recognized with the William Mulholland Memorial Fountain, built in 1940 at Riverside Drive and Los Feliz Boulevard in Los Feliz. Mulholland Drive and Mulholland Dam are both named after him.

=== St. Francis Dam failure ===
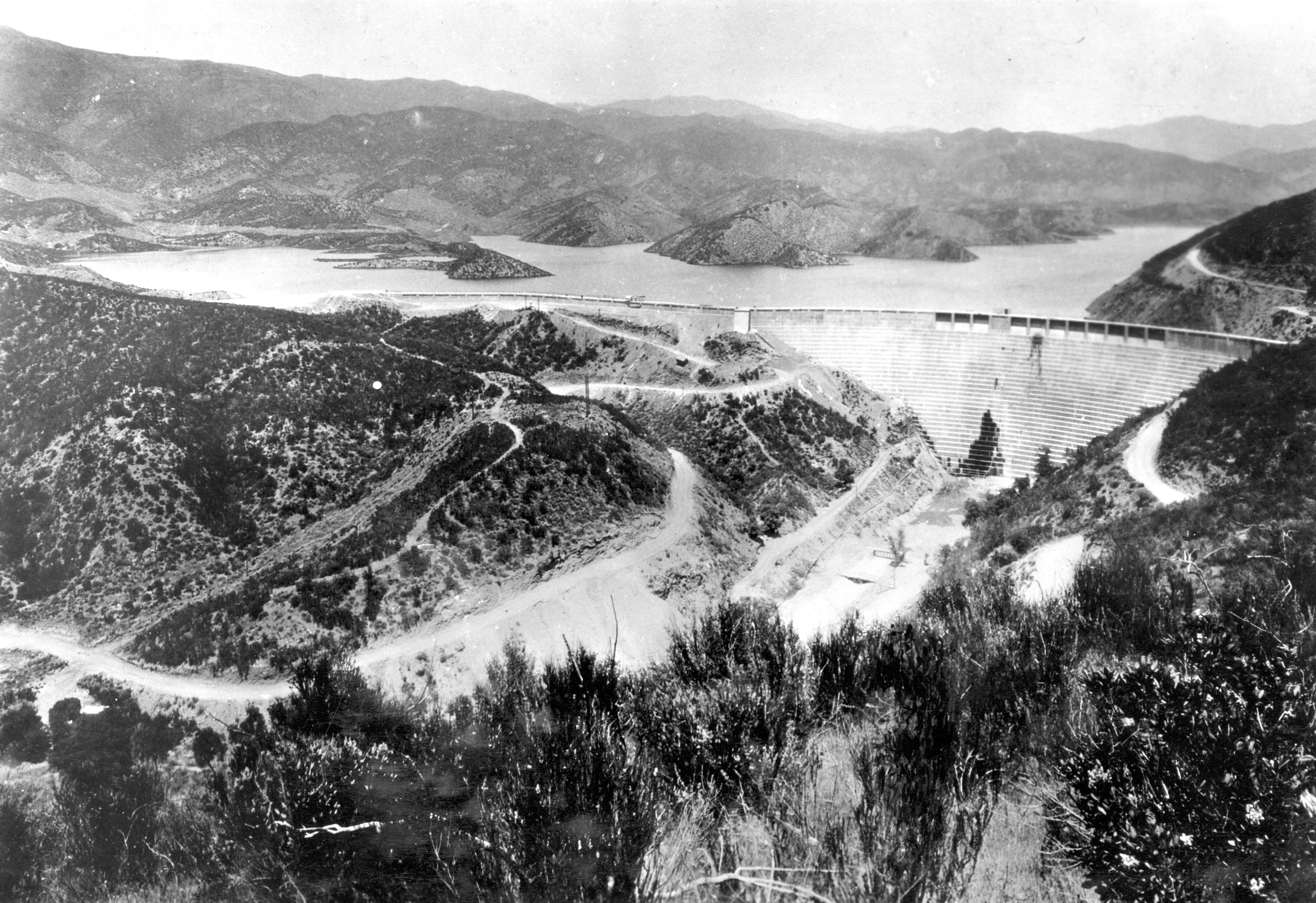
A photo of the St. Francis Dam, taken one year before its collapse

In 1917, The Bureau of Los Angeles Aqueduct sought to build a holding reservoir to regulate flow and provide hydroelectric power and storage in case of disruption to the aqueduct system. The initial site chosen was in Long Valley along the Owens River, but Eaton, who had bought up much of the valley in anticipation of the need for a reservoir, refused to sell the land at the price offered by Los Angeles. Mulholland then made the decision to move the reservoir to San Francisquito Canyon above what is now Santa Clarita, California. The resulting St. Francis Dam was completed in 1926 and created a reservoir capacity of 38,000 acre-feet (47,000,000 m^{3}). On March 12, 1928, the dam catastrophically failed, sending a 100-foot high (30 m) wall of water down the canyon, ultimately reaching the Pacific Ocean near Ventura and Oxnard, and killing at least 431 people. The resulting investigation and trial led to the retirement of William Mulholland as the head of the Los Angeles Bureau of Water Works and Supply in 1929. The dam failure is the worst man-made flood disaster in the US in the 20th century and the second largest single-event loss of life in California history after the 1906 San Francisco earthquake.

The failure of the dam raised the question in a number of people's minds whether the city had engineering competence and capability to manage such a large project as the Colorado River Aqueduct despite the fact that they had built the Los Angeles Aqueduct. After the collapse, the pace of annexation came to a rapid halt when eleven nearby cities including Burbank, Glendale, Pasadena, Beverly Hills, San Marino, Santa Monica, Anaheim, Colton, Santa Ana, and San Bernardino decided to form the Metropolitan Water District with Los Angeles. The city's growth following the formation of the MWD would be limited to 27.65 square miles.

== Environmental impact ==
=== Owens Valley ecosystem and agriculture ===
The impact of the Los Angeles Aqueduct Project to the Owens Valley region was immediate and detrimental to future agricultural work of local farmers. In 1923, in an effort to increase the water supply, the city of Los Angeles began purchasing vast parcels of land and commenced the drilling of new wells in the region, significantly lowering the level of groundwater in the Owens Valley, even affecting farmers who “did not sell to the city’s representatives.” By 1970, constant groundwater pumping by the city of Los Angeles had virtually dried up all the major springs in the Owens Valley, impacting the surrounding wetlands, springs, meadows, and marsh habitats. The consequent transfer of water out of the Owens Lake and Mono Lake decimated the natural ecology of the region, transforming what was a “lush terrain into desert.”

=== Ongoing revitalization efforts ===
Despite the ecological and environmental destruction of both Mono and Owens Lake from the construction of the Los Angeles Aqueduct, the Owens Valley and adjoining Mono Lake remain a sanctuary for many bird species that migrate to this region. The legal notion of a “Public Trust Doctrine” used by community members of Owens Valley has been successful in restoring regions of Mono Lake, Mono Highlands and the Owens Valley impacted by the Los Angeles Aqueduct, evident by the re-watering projects that have spurred revitalization of natural local ecosystems.

In 1991, the City of Los Angeles signed the Inyo-LA Long Term Water Agreement despite objections from community members and stakeholders. Concessions of the deal included mitigation projects like the Lower Owens River Project that sought to reduce further air contamination and health risks associated with the dust storms as well as future preservation of the ecology of the Owens Valley.

In 2001, the Los Angeles Department of Water and Power commenced studies on the environmental impact of dust storms, suggesting proposals in re-watering both Mono Lake and Lake Owens.

In 2006, work commenced on the Lower Owens River Project 15 years after it was signed, helping boost the number of fish in the river, restoring marsh habitats, and promoting recreational activities such as fishing and canoeing by re-watering 62 miles of riverbed.

In 2009, the Los Angeles Department of Water and Power resumed ongoing efforts to a proposed master plan in the preservation of the natural habitat of Lake Owens as part of its Owens Lake Dust Mitigation Program (OLDMP).

== Future water needs ==
Los Angeles faces significant challenges in securing its water supply for the future due to climate change, population growth, and increasing competition for resources. The city's reliance on imported water from the Los Angeles Aqueduct (LAA), the Colorado River Aqueduct, and the California State Water Project is becoming increasingly strained. These sources are threatened by reduced Sierra Nevada snowpack, prolonged droughts, and legal disputes over water rights.

Efforts to address these challenges include transitioning to more sustainable, local sources such as reclaimed water, desalination, and rainwater harvesting. The city is also exploring integrated water management strategies, including groundwater treatment and water reuse. Additionally, demand management measures, such as incentives for water conservation and public awareness campaigns, are being implemented to reduce dependency on imported water. Innovations in water pricing and regulation are expected to play a vital role in managing future demand.

== Social consequences ==
=== Farmers ===
In 1905, the city of Los Angeles began the process of acquiring water and land rights in the Owens Valley region in preparation for the construction of the Los Angeles Aqueduct, initially misleading farmers who were under the assumption that the purchases were intended for a local water project. Due to many farmers holding on to a very small portion of the total water in Owens Valley, no singular farmer had the means to influence or divert attention away from the desires of Los Angeles in wanting to acquire water and land rights in the region. Accordingly, farmers formed collective groups to increase their bargaining power, the most notable being the Owens Valley Irrigation District. Nevertheless, the city of Los Angeles bypassed such efforts from the collective farmer groups through engaging in checkerboarding, purchasing and acquiring surrounding land of an opposing farmer and essentially circumvent the need to buy their land altogether. By 1934, the city of Los Angeles had acquired 95% of the agricultural land in the Owens Valley.

=== Indigenous ===
According to archaeologists and anthropologists, the Paiute people, also known as Nüńwa Paya Hūp Ca’á Otūǔ’m (translates to “We are Water Ditch Coyote children"), settled in the Owens Valley region as early as 600 C.E., having long adopted and specialized in a hunting and harvesting economy.

As a result of mining and agricultural development in California in the mid-19th century following the annexation of the state as well as the subsequent influx of white settlers coming into the region, many Paiute people were relocated to what is now modern-day Porterville, California in 1863. The Paiute people that remained found it difficult to continue harvesting indigenous food sources as the ongoing siphoning of the Owens Valley water by the city of Los Angeles for the aqueduct project dramatically altered the supply of water in the surrounding region.

In 1937, the United States Federal Government signed into the law the Bankhead-Jones Farm Tenant Act, commonly known as the Land Exchange Act, which allowed Paiute people to trade 2,914 acres of allotted land to the city of Los Angeles in exchange for 1,392 acres of hospitable lands which became the Bishop, Big Pine, and Lone Pine Reservations located east from the Sierra Nevada Mountains. Nevertheless, the U.S. federal government was unable to secure for the Paiutes water rights from the city of Los Angeles, which insisted that they required a two-third vote from city residents to be able to transfer water. This left the Paiute people without adequate amounts of water to accommodate for their growing population.

In 1994, the Department of the Interior opened an ongoing investigation looking into the water rights issues between the city of Los Angeles and the Paiute people, led by the Owens Valley Indian Water Commission, a consortium comprising the Bishop, Big Pine, and Lone Pine Reservations.

== In popular culture ==
- Saugus High School derives the name of its daily newsletter, The Pipeline, from an exposed portion of the first aqueduct that passes southwest of the school's property.
- San Francisquito Canyon and DWP Power House #1 are featured in Visiting... with Huell Howser Episode 424.
- The serialized story "Dared for Los Angeles." by Roland Ashford Phillips takes place in a construction camp for the Los Angeles aqueduct and was serialized in five issues of the dime novel Nick Carter Detective from issue 134 (April 4, 1915) through issue 139 (May 8, 1915). Project Guttenberg link https://www.gutenberg.org/cache/epub/66485/pg66485-images.html

== California Historical Landmark – Cascades ==
The Cascades, which was completed on November 5, 1913, is located near the intersection of Foothill Boulevard and Balboa Boulevard, four miles northwest of San Fernando. It was designated as a California Historical Landmark on July 28, 1958.

== Gallery ==
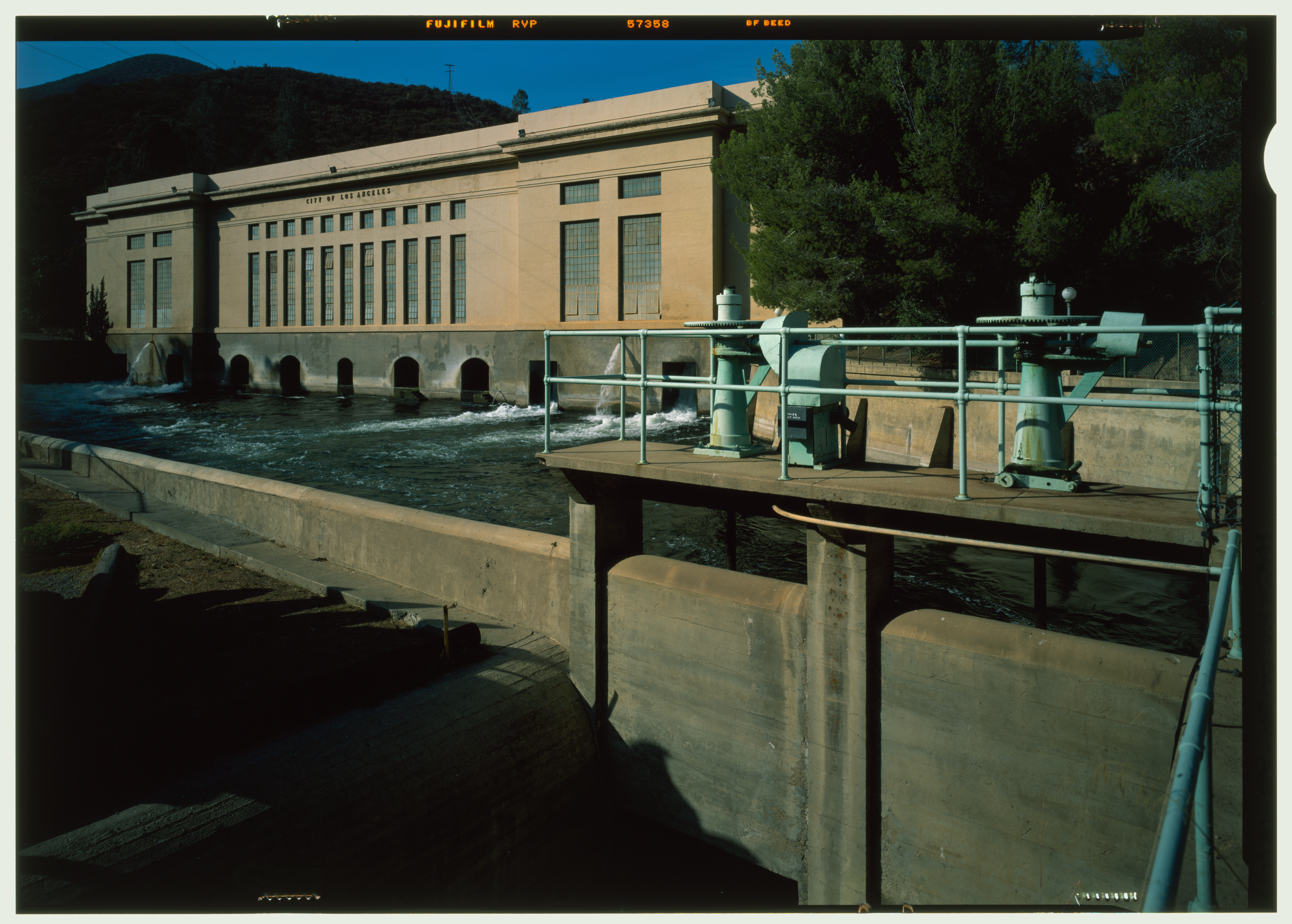
San Francisquito Power Plant No. 1

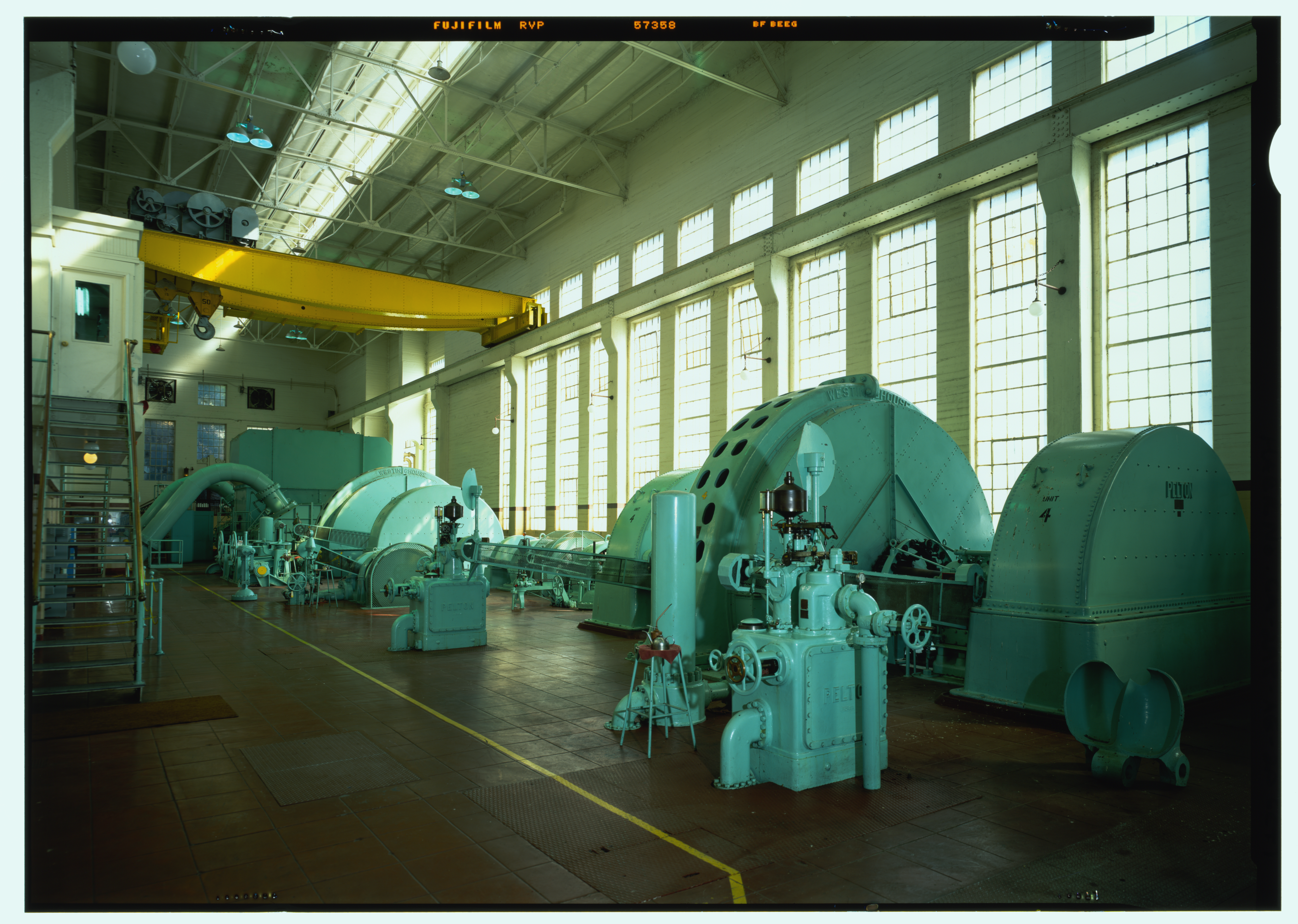
San Francisquito Power Plant No. 1

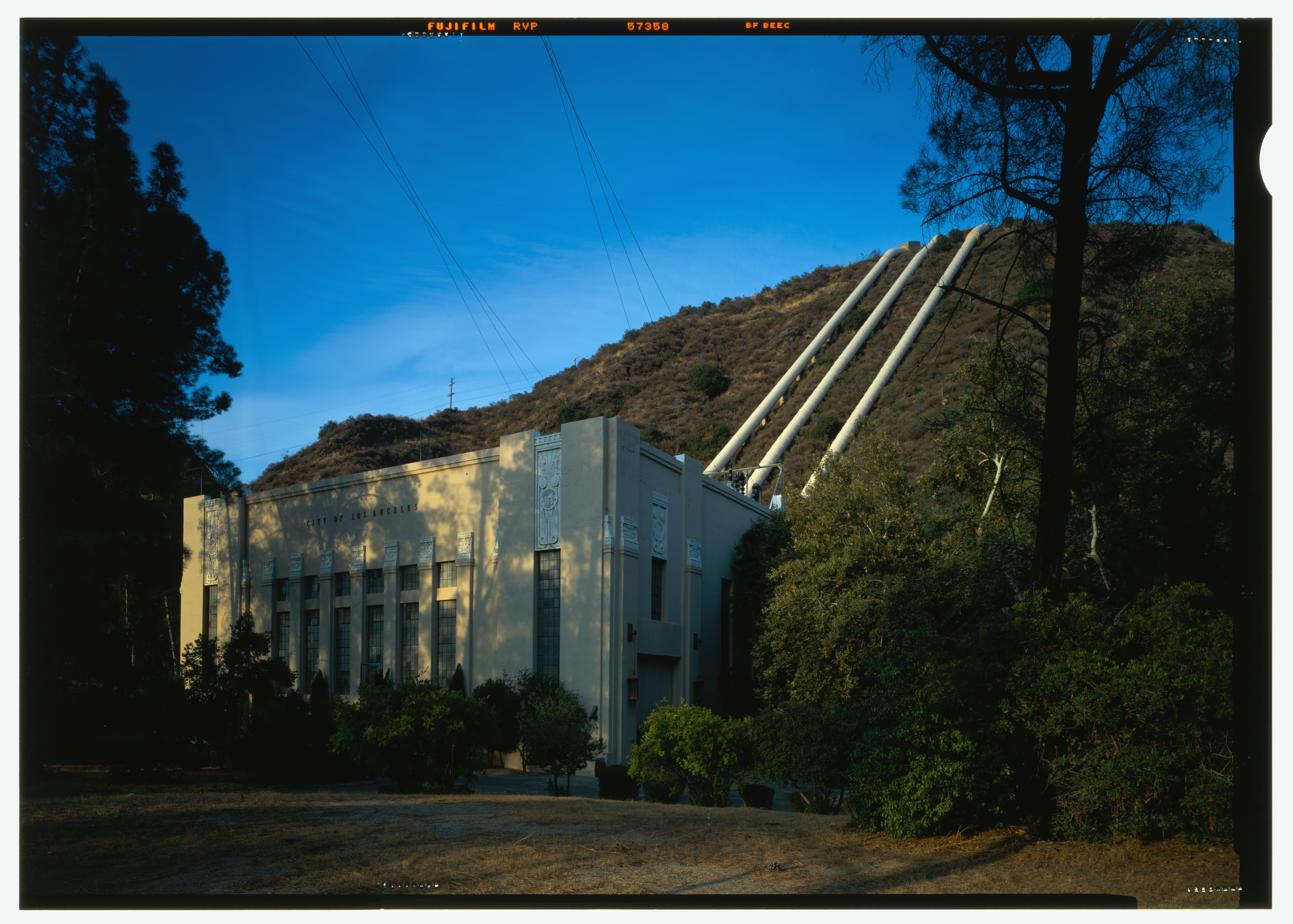
San Francisquito Power Plant No. 2

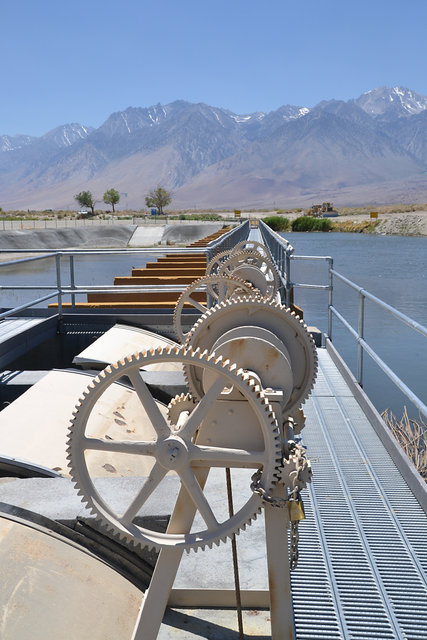
Diversion gates that control inflow to the Lower Owens River

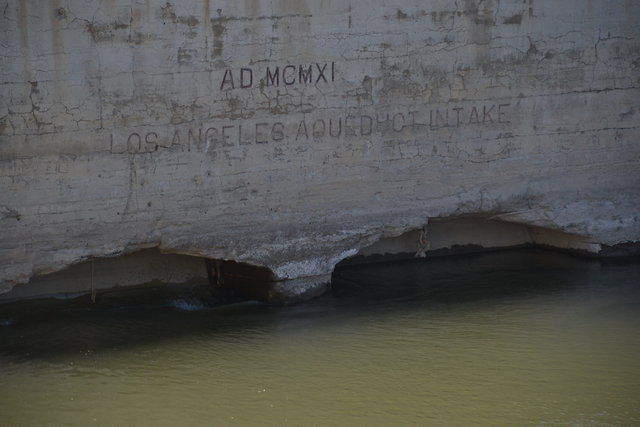
Intake where water is diverted from the Owens River

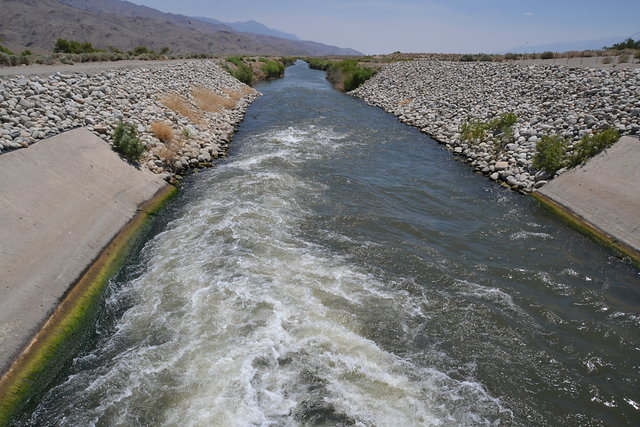
Water entering the aqueduct at its northern terminus

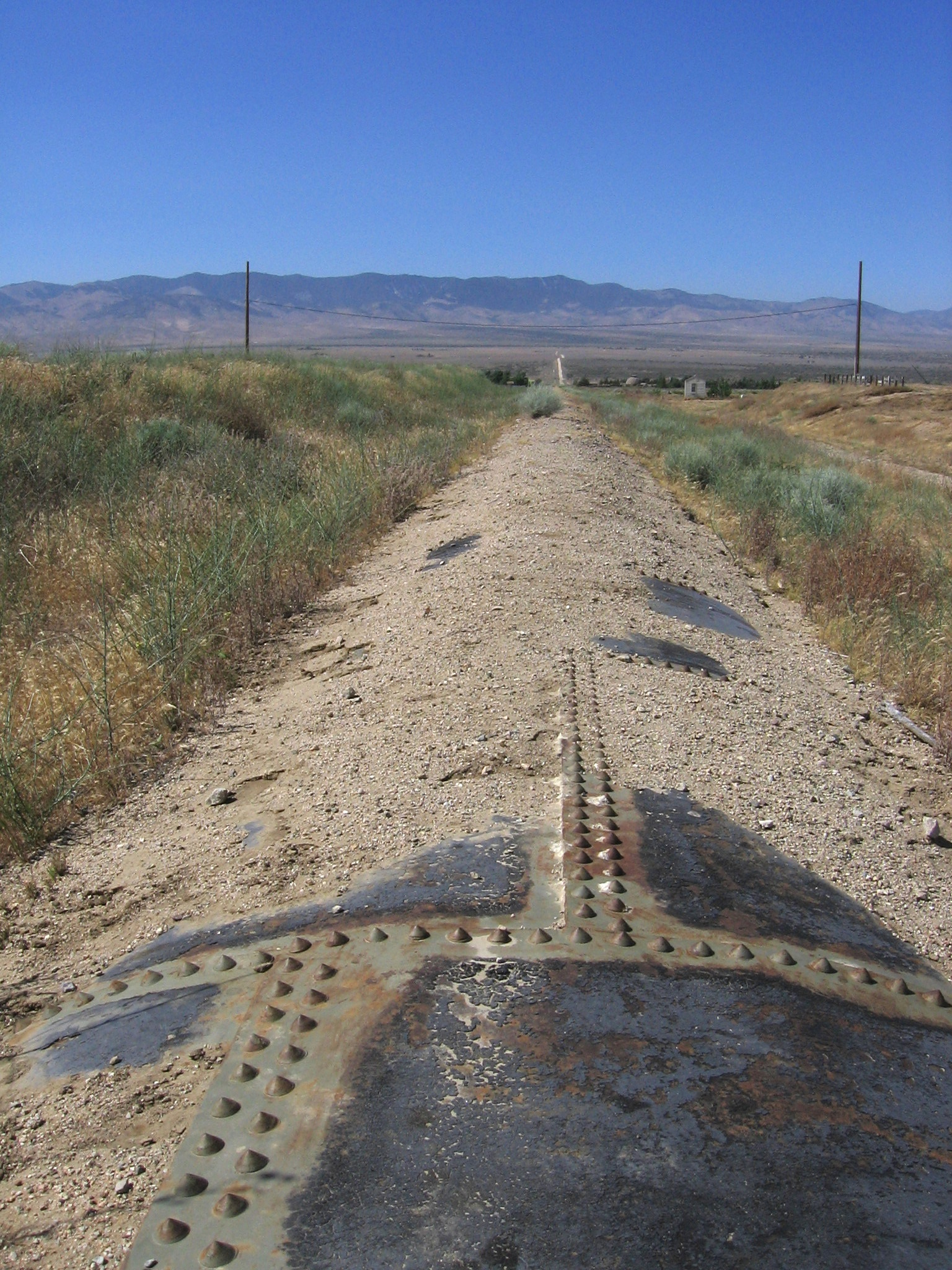
The Los Angeles Aqueduct in Antelope Valley

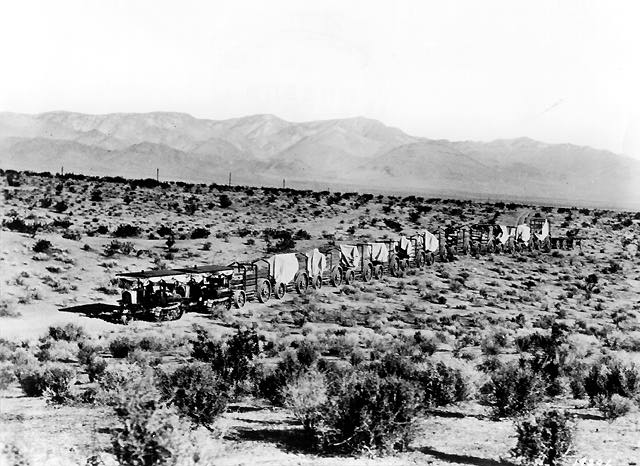
Holt tractors at work during construction of the first aqueduct in 1909

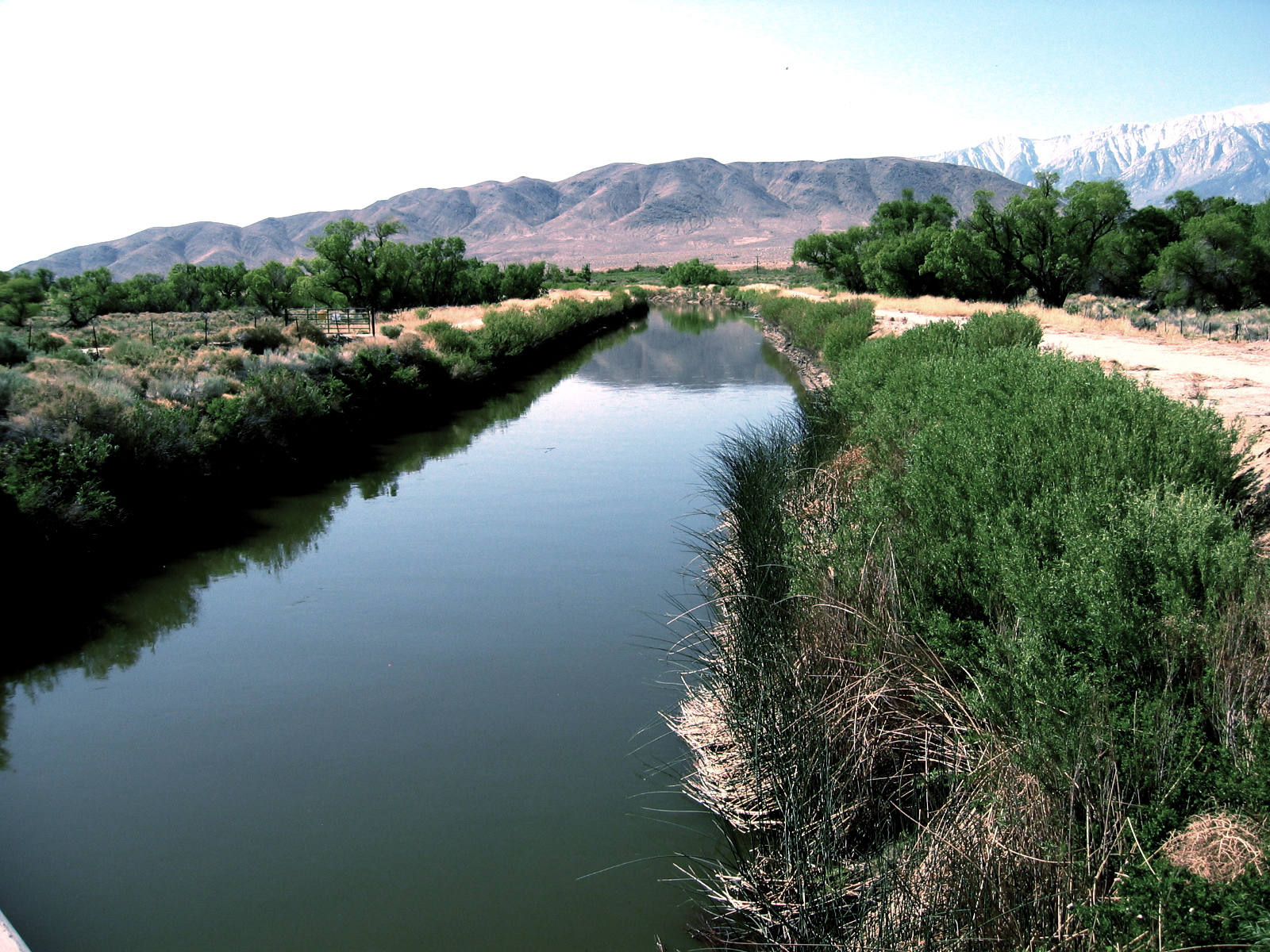
Unlined section of the Los Angeles Aqueduct, just south of Manzanar, near US Highway 395

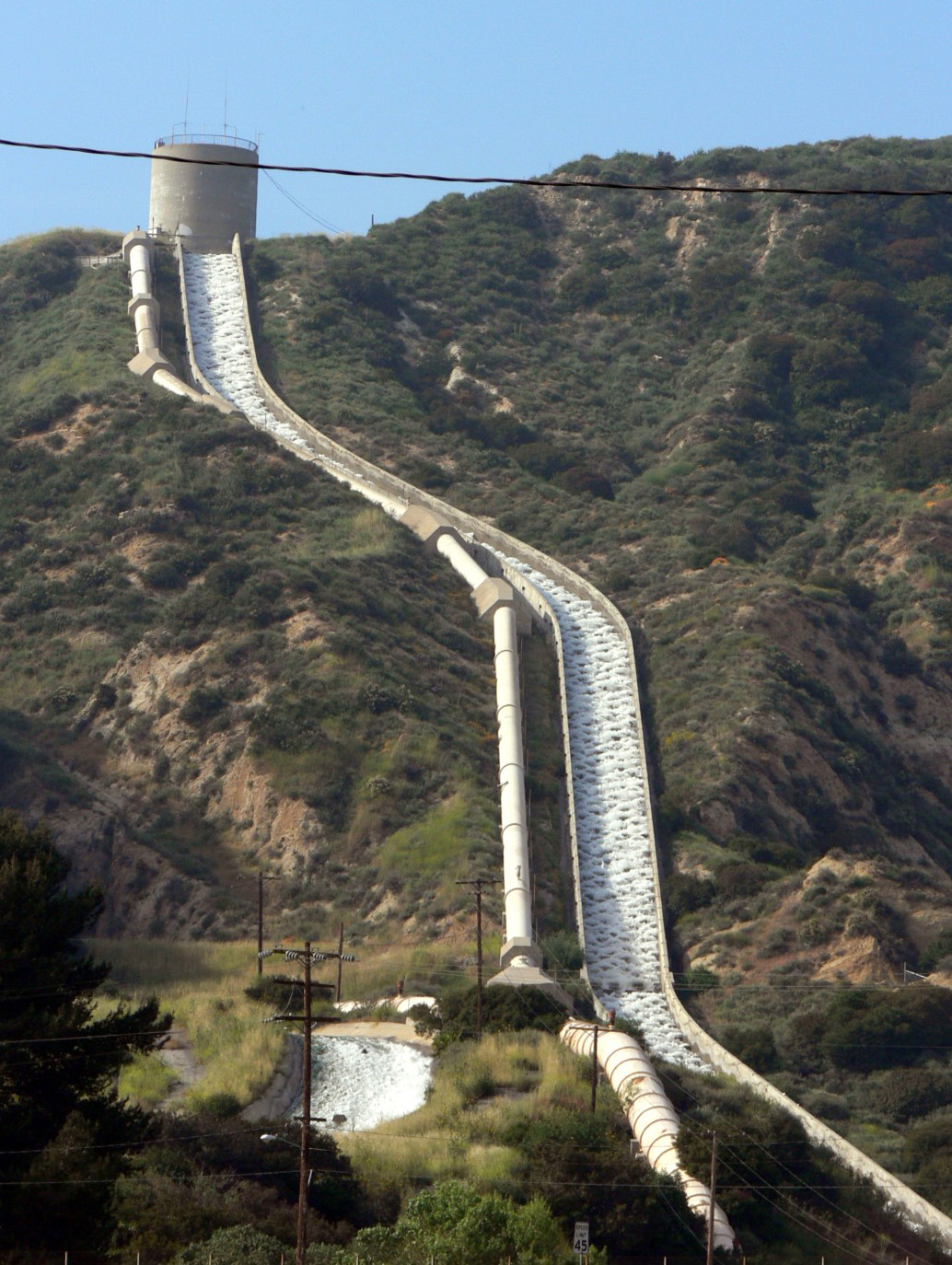
The Terminal Structure and penstock above and alongside the new Cascades on the Los Angeles Aqueduct near Newhall Pass

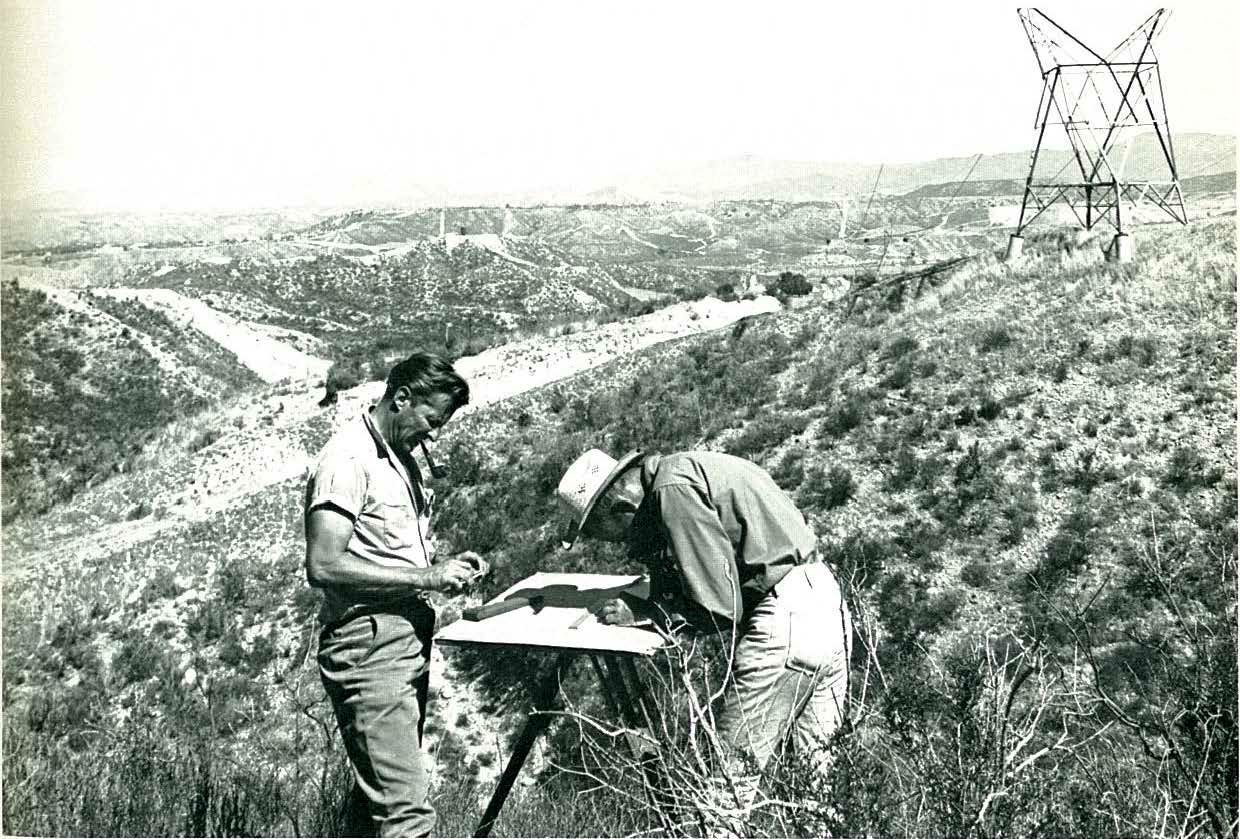
Department Surveyors plotting topography for Second Los Angeles Aqueduct.

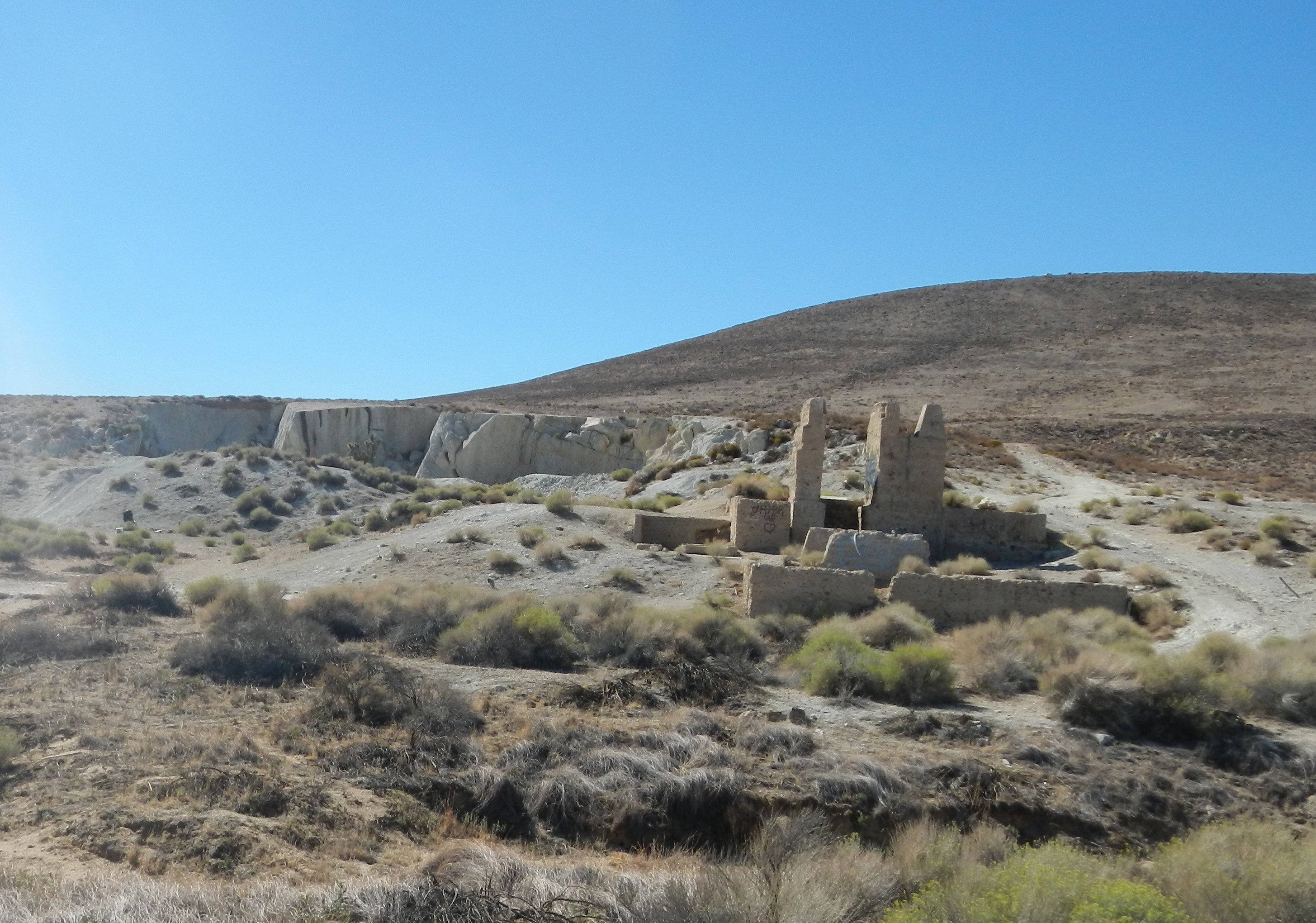
Fairmont Mill ruins on the east side of Fairmont Butte. This mill was one of three that the city ran to produce cement for the Los Angeles Aqueduct.

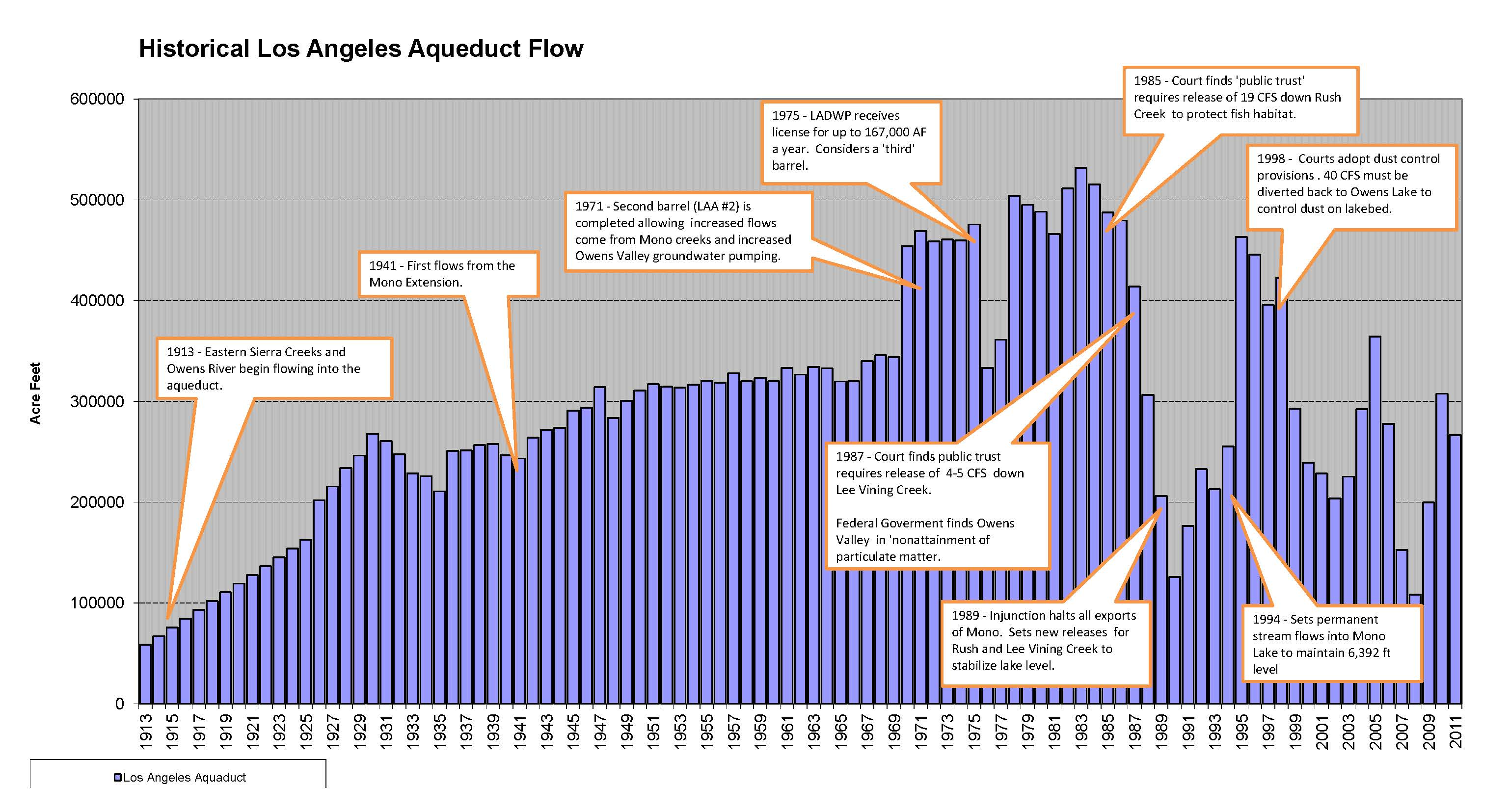
Chart showing water imports through the Los Angeles Aqueduct system from 1913 through 2011.

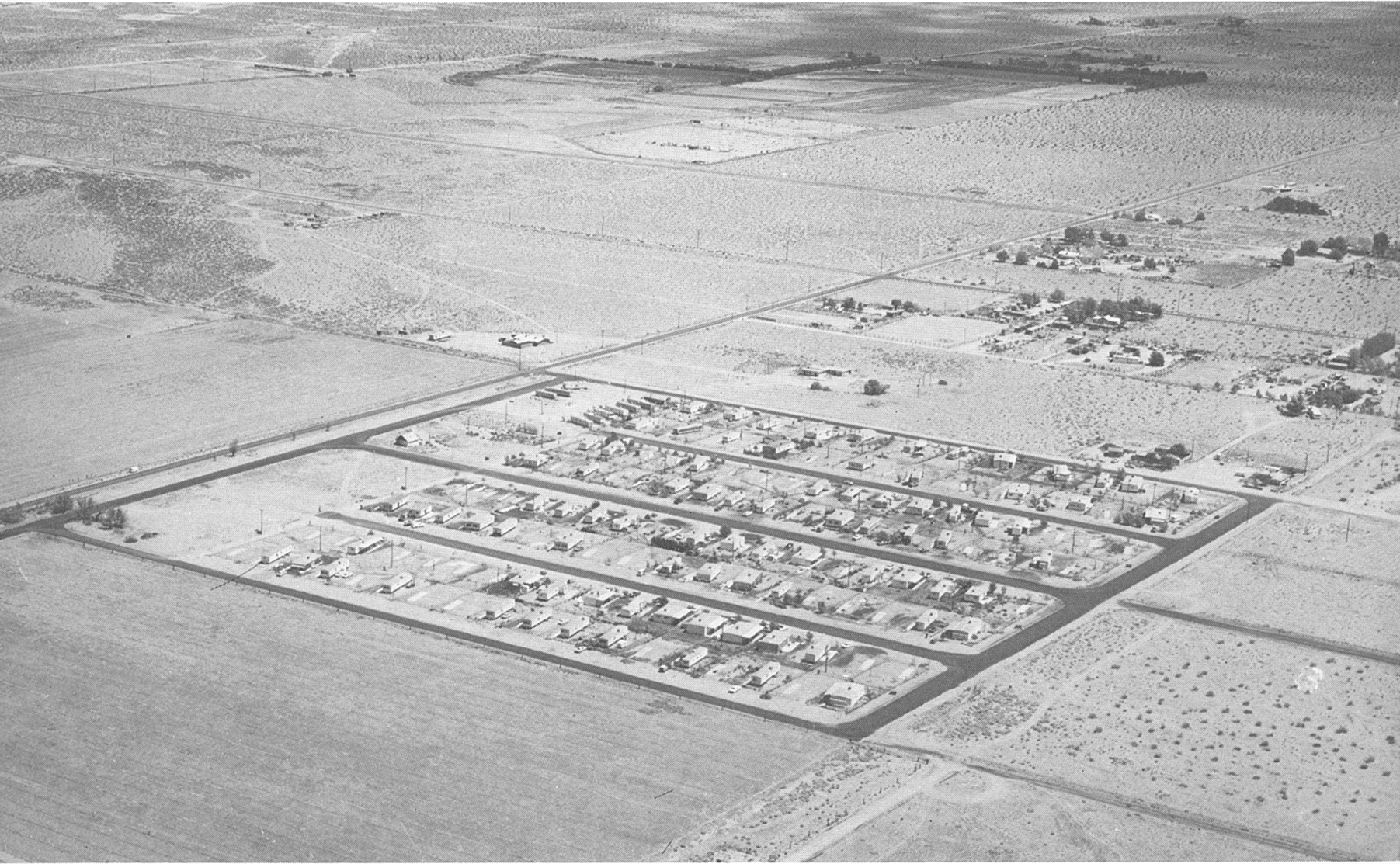
Shangri-La Estates in Ridgecrest, California, was built to provide temporary housing for personnel during the construction of the SLAA.

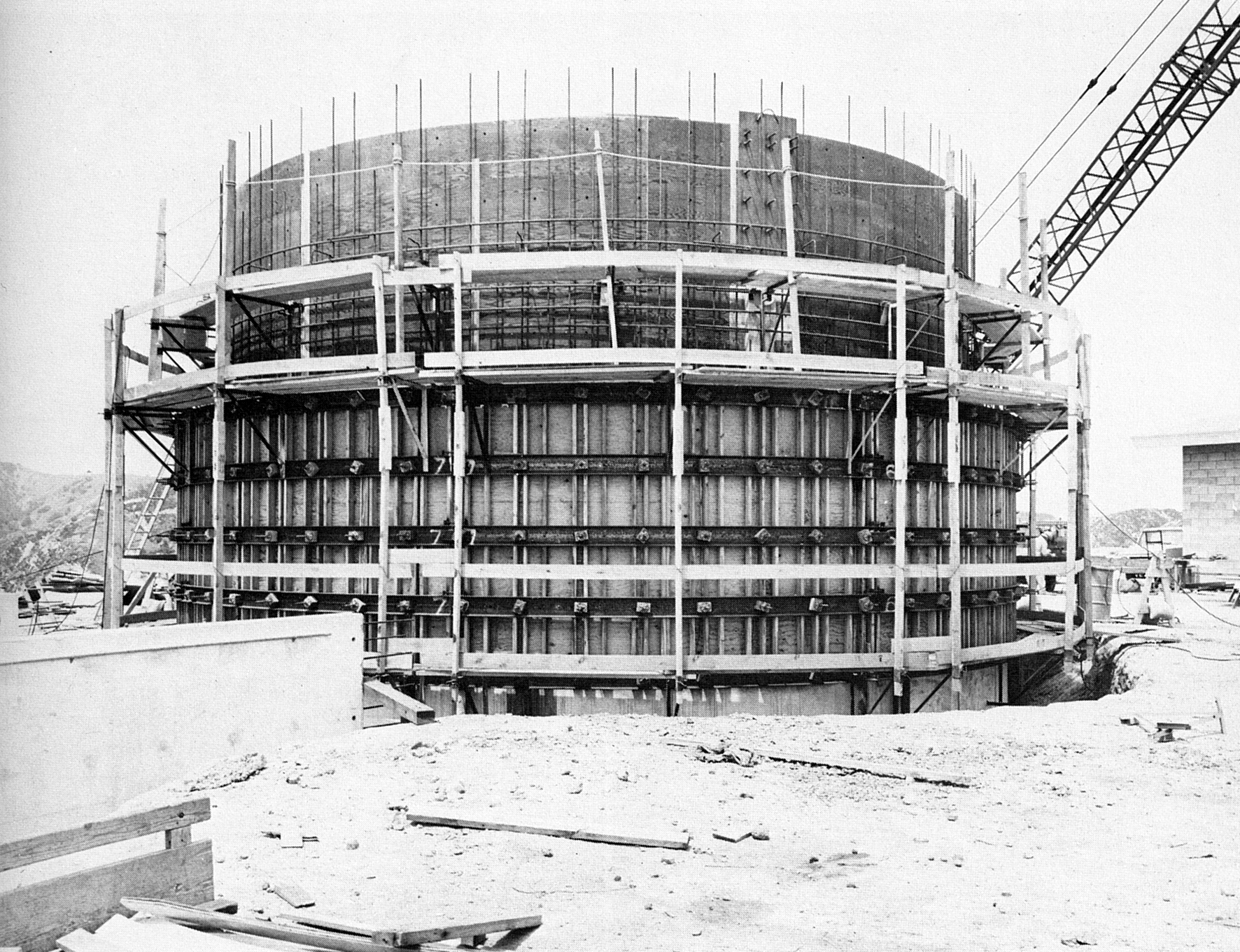
Forming in place for Terminal Structure above the SLAA cascade.

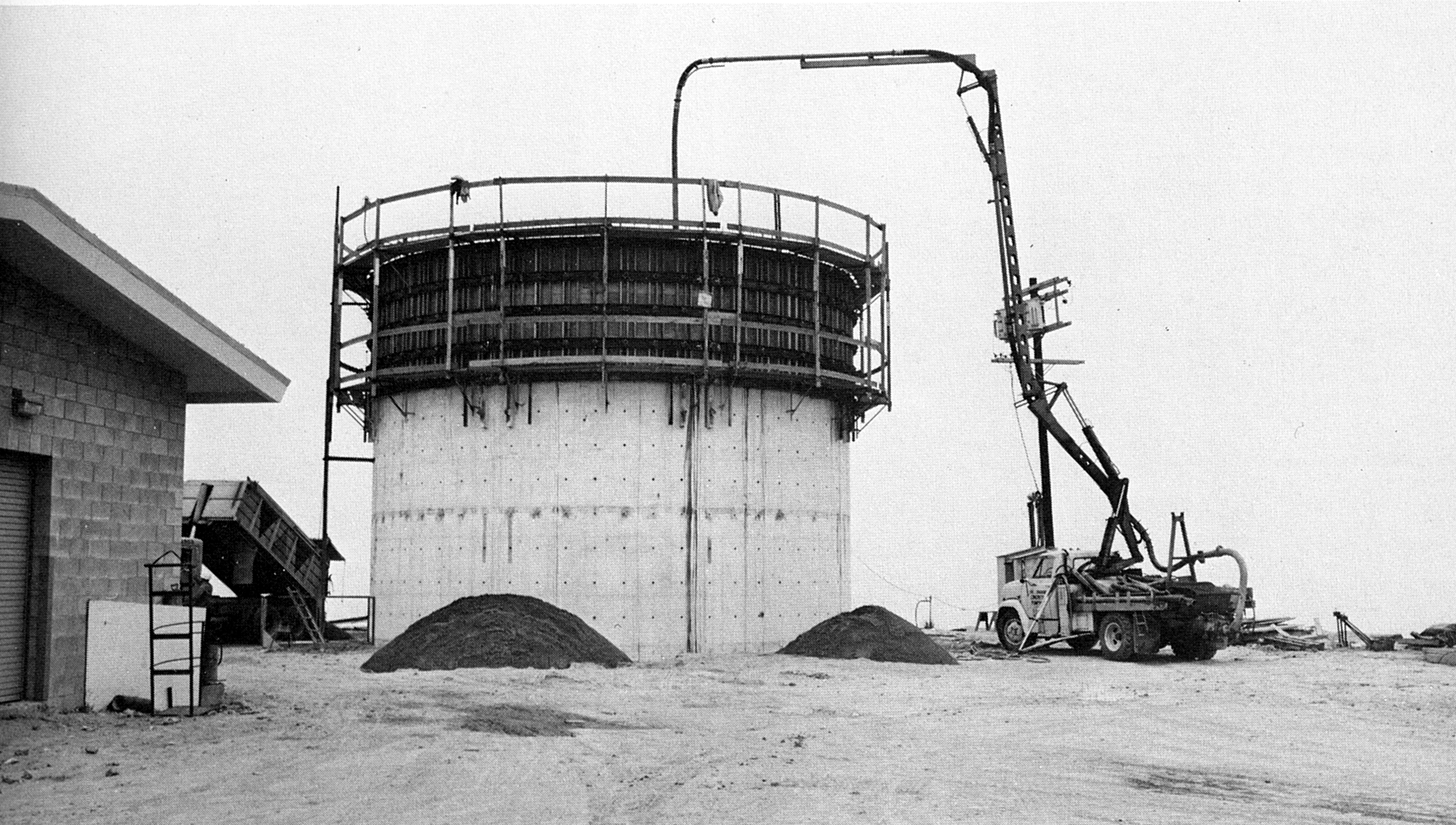
Pouring concrete for Terminal Structure above the SLAA cascade.

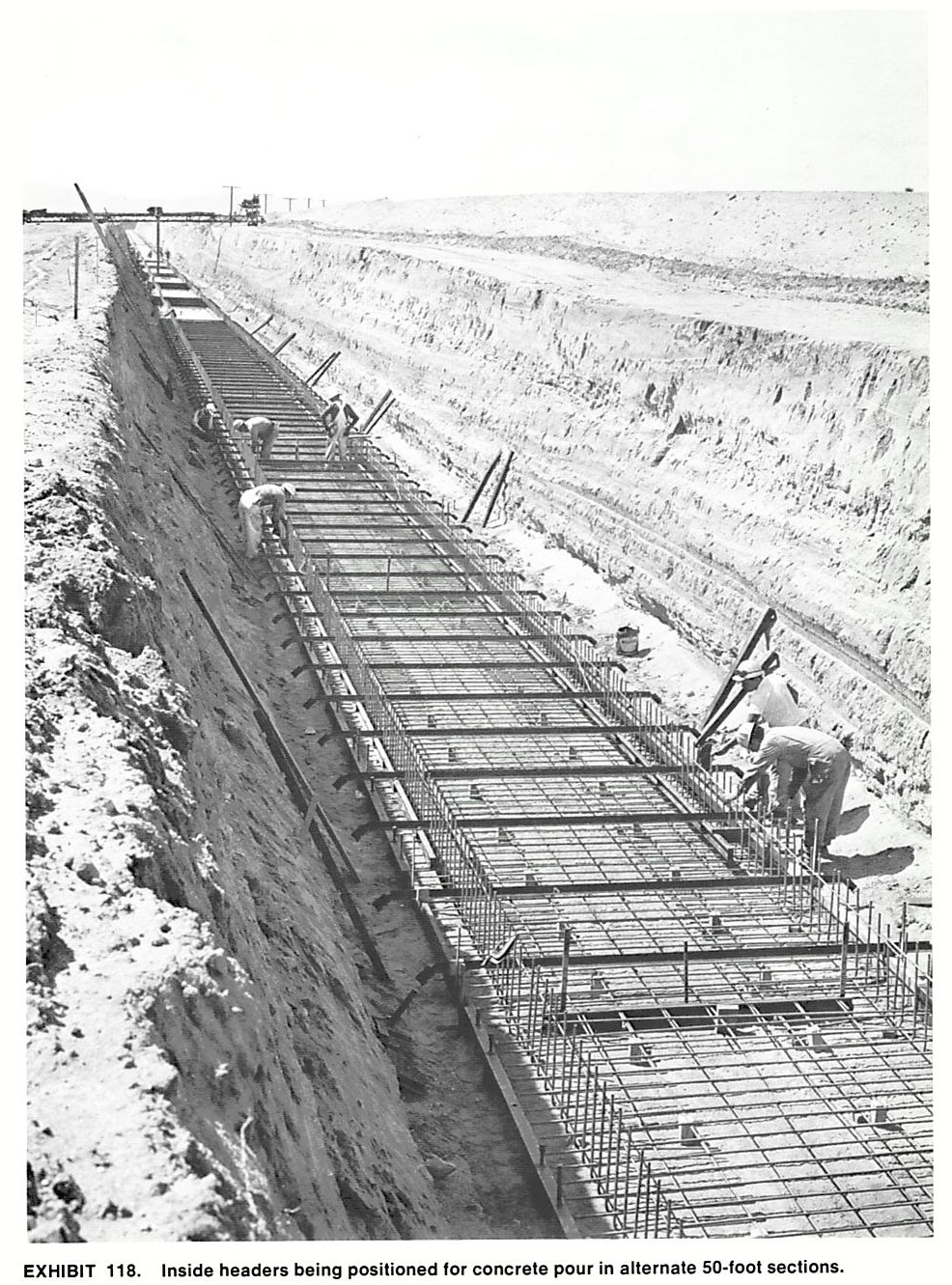
Construction of the Second Los Angeles Aqueduct.

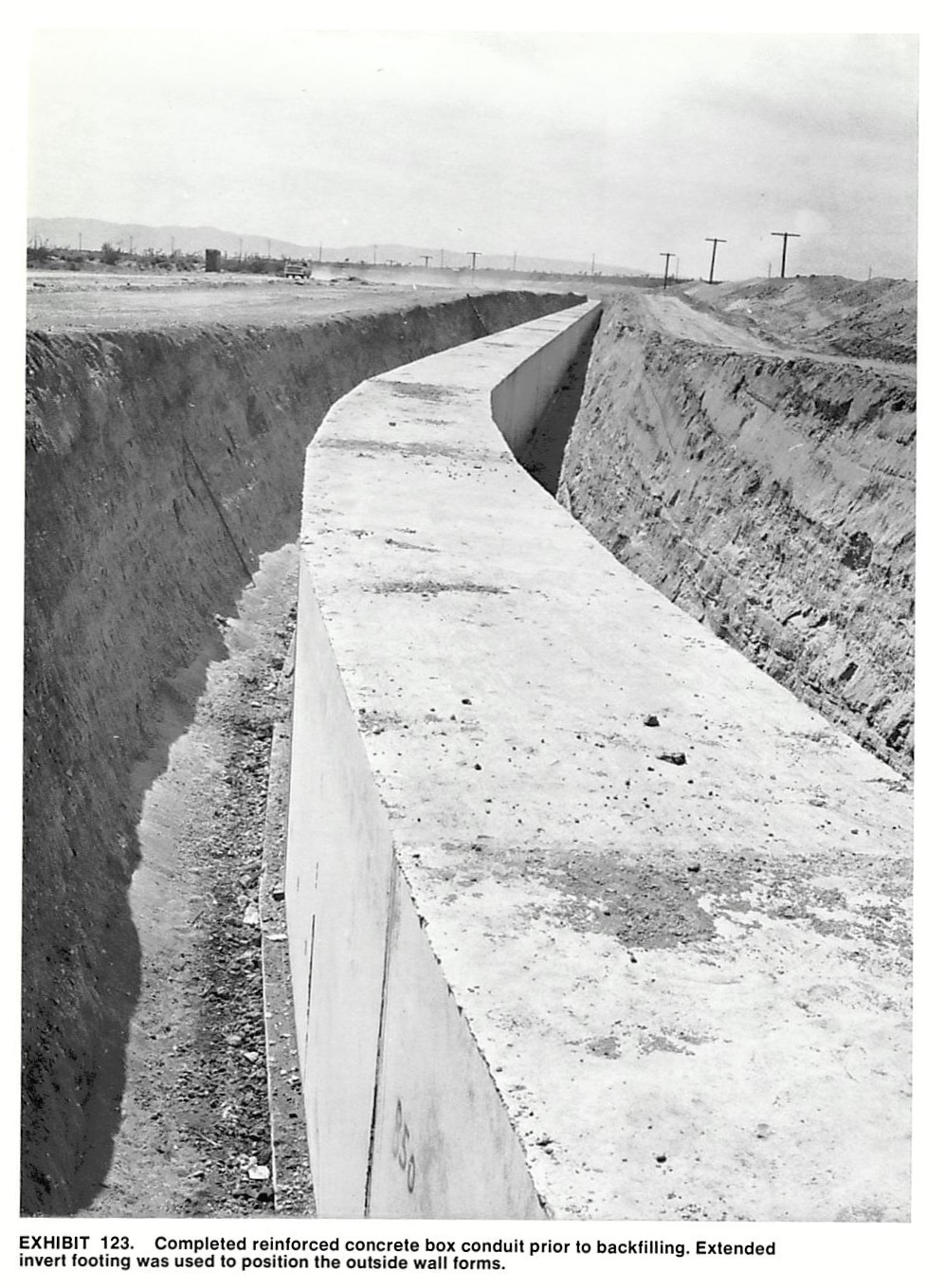
Finished concrete box on the Los Angeles Aqueduct.

== See also ==
- American Water Landmark
- California Aqueduct
- Colorado River Aqueduct
- State Water Project
- Owensmouth
