= Searles Valley =

Valley in California, United States

Coordinates: 35.6°N 117.3°W

Searles Valley is a valley in the northern Mojave Desert of California, with the northern half in Inyo County and the southern half in San Bernardino County, California, United States.

Searles Valley is located between the Argus Range to the west and the Slate Range to the east. Death Valley is to the northeast. The valley contains the landform features of Searles Lake and the Trona Pinnacles.

The valley was named after John Wemple Searles.

== Settlements ==
The Searles Valley Minerals company town of Trona is the primary settlement. Other towns in the Searles Valley include: Westend, Argus, Borosolvay, Pioneer Point, Homewood Canyon, and Searles Valley. Sometimes Argus, Westend, Pioneer Point, and Trona are collectively referred to as Trona.

== See also ==
- Trona Railway
- Panamint Valley
- Indian Wells Valley
- Potash wars (California)
