= American Trona Corporation Building =

- U.S. National Register of Historic Places
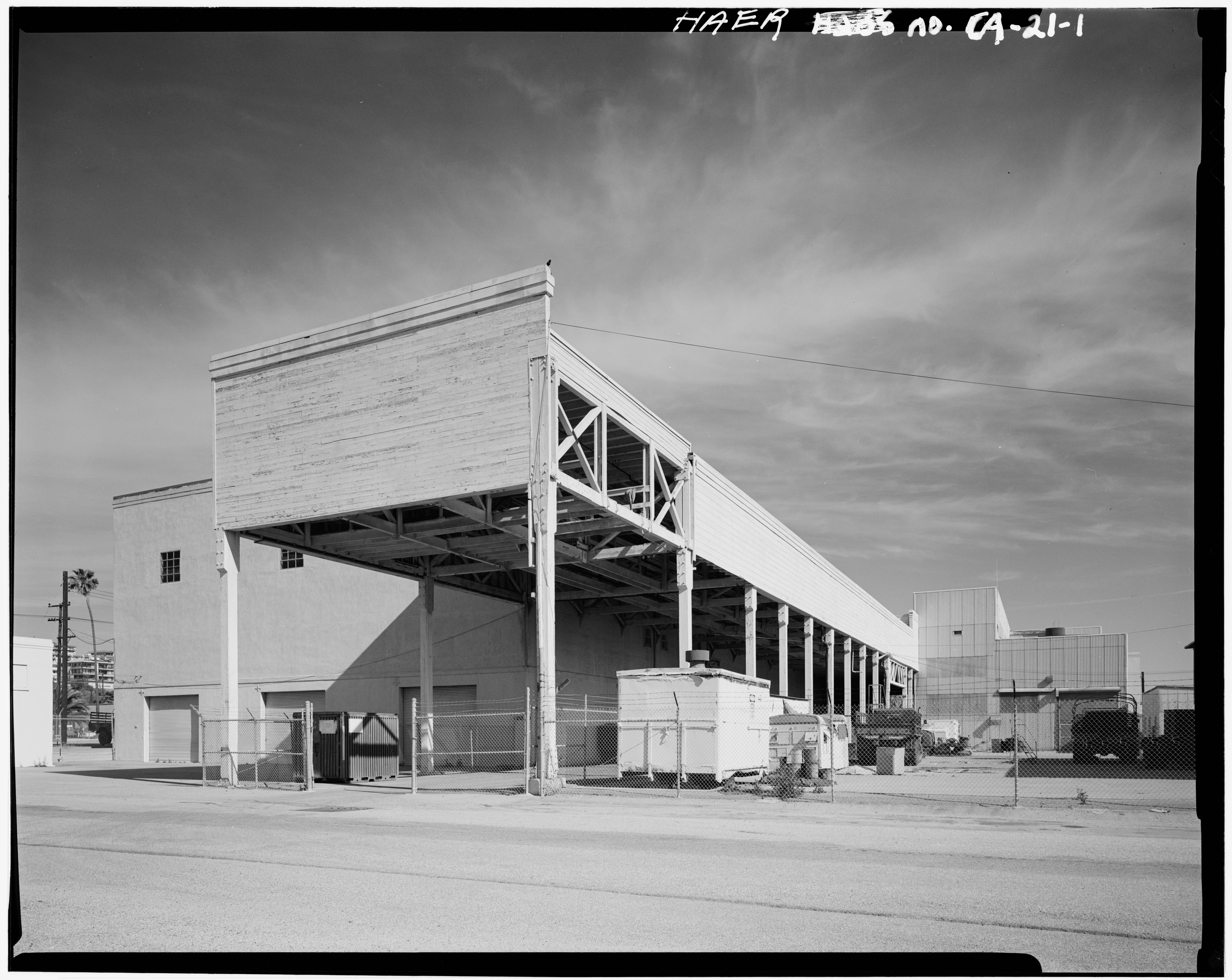
- c. 1982 HABS photo

- Location within the Los Angeles metropolitan area Location within California Location within the United States
- Location: Pacific Avenue, San Pedro, Los Angeles, California
- Coordinates: 33°43′3″N 118°17′15″W
- Area: less than one acre
- Built: 1916
- NRHP reference No.: 84000785
- Added to NRHP: August 30, 1984

American Trona Corporation Building is an industrial building on Pacific Avenue between 28th and 30th Streets in the San Pedro neighborhood of Los Angeles, California. It was built from 1916-1917 by the American Trona Corporation of California, to process and store salt potash from the company's mining facilities at Searles Lake in the Mojave Desert, near Trona in eastern San Bernardino County, California. It is now on the grounds of the Fort MacArthur housing annex of the Los Angeles Air Force Base.

== History ==
Mining

The building originally included crushers, separators and a network of conveyor belts to process the potash. The building has approximately 25,000 square feet (2,300 m^{2}) of interior space on two floors and is said to be one of the largest still existing wood structural spaces in an industrial building on the West Coast. The foundation and interior walls of the first floor were built with reinforced concrete, and the entire upper section is made of wood.

Due to advances in methods for separating potash, the plant was used for that purpose for only a short time, and there is some indication that the facility never went into full production.

Other uses

In 1920, the building was offered for sale at $200,000 to become part of a proposed submarine naval base at the Los Angeles Harbor. The building was converted to use as a saw mill and warehouse during the 1920s and 1930s.

The building became part of the U.S. Army Fort MacArthur in 1942, and has remained under military ownership since that time. The ownership of Fort MacArthur transferred to the U.S. Air Force in 1982.

The building was listed on the National Register of Historic Places in 1982.

== See also ==
- List of Los Angeles Historic-Cultural Monuments in the Harbor area
- National Register of Historic Places listings in Los Angeles, California
- Potash wars (California)
