= Epsom Salts Monorail =

Former monorail in California

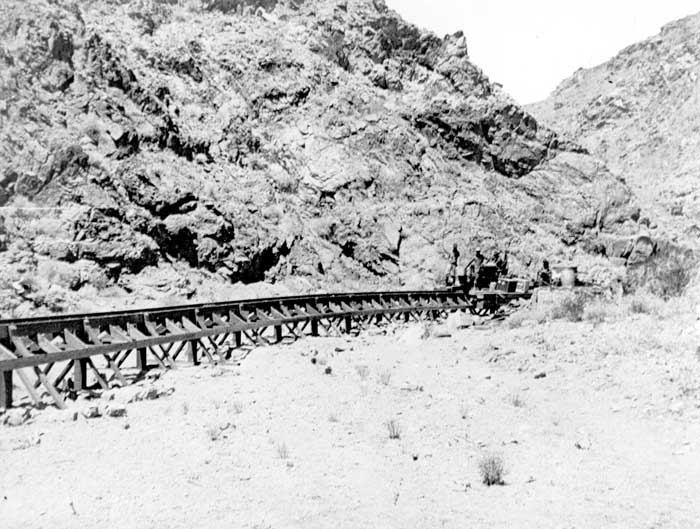

Overview
- Other name: Magnesium Monorail
- Owner: American Magnesium Company
- Coordinates: 35°41′N 117°23′W
- Stations: none

Service
- Type: monorail

History
- Opened: 1924
- Closed: June 1926

Technical
- Line length: 45 km (28 mi)
- Operating speed: 56 km/h (35 mph)
- Highest elevation: 1,067 m (3,501 ft)

The Epsom Salts Monorail or Magnesium Monorail was a short-lived monorail in San Bernardino County, California, in the United States. It was built to carry epsomite from a deposit in the Owlshead Mountains to a siding of the Trona Railway. It ran nearly due east from Trona, for a distance of about 28 mi (45 km). The monorail was opened in 1924 and closed in June 1926.

== History ==
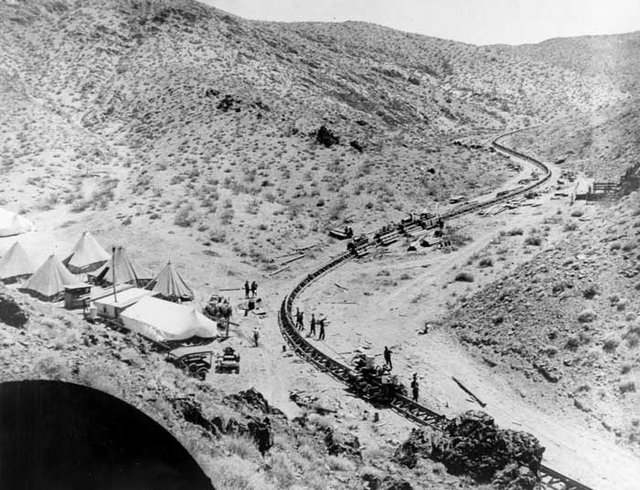
Camp of the Epsom Salts Monorail

Thomas Wright, a florist from Los Angeles, set up a camp in Crystal Hills Wash in 1918 and prepared an area for salt mining, where he had previously found some minerals. He and his reconnaissance team needed to transport their supplies by truck from Randsburg on inadequate tracks over a distance of 40 miles (64 km). Building a narrow-gauge railway line was considered to be too expensive, so that they decided to build a monorail on wooden trestles. They founded the American Magnesium Company to construct the monorail track from freshly logged Douglas firs, which were shipped to San Pedro and then transported by the Trona Railway to the sidings at Magnesia near Searles. Construction began in 1922 and by September they had passed the half-way point with 15 of 28 miles (25 of 45 km).

The monorail was completed and inaugurated in 1924. It became known as the "fastest monorail of the world", because it could pass the 28 miles (45 km) long track fully loaded within an hour. However, it transported less salt than originally estimated within the first two years of its use.

The mine employed 12–15 workers in 1924/25. The epsomite could initially be scraped from the surface using gardener's tools, but the high-quality minerals were quickly depleted, and the remainder was mixed with 50% contaminants of sand, debris and other salts. The return on investment was hampered by the high transportation cost to the factory of the American Magnesium Company in Wilmington, especially caused by the high maintenance cost for the wooden track, which distorted when the beams dried, by initially inappropriate locomotives and by landslides which damaged the track. The mine was closed in 1926. As no buyers could be found for the complete installation, only a small percentage of the initial investments could be rescued during the liquidation of the company.

== Route ==
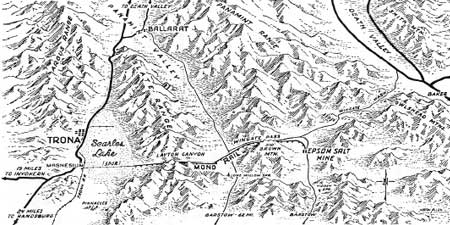
Map of the Epsom Salts Monorail

The monorail started at the sidings in Magnesia, crossed the dry bed of the Searles Lake and climbed on a ramp through the Layton Canyon with a gain of 1,800 feet (550 m) in 5 miles (8.0 km), i.e. a 7% gradient. It passed the Layton Pass, whose summit is 3,500 feet (1,100 m) above sea level, and followed a steep canyon downwards to the bed of the Panamint Valley with only one road crossing on its way. At the other side of the valley it climbed with a gradient of 10–12% to the Wingate Pass, followed then the Wingate Wash and the Crystal Hills Wash and turned finally eastwards to the camp and mine.

== Track ==
Before construction began, a prototype was built and a patent was taken out on June 23, 1923.

A conventional steel rail with 50 to 80 lb/yd (25–40 kg/m) was installed on a central 4 by 6 inches (10 by 15 centimetres) wooden beam. This was supported by trestles 8 feet (2.4 m) apart. 2 by 6 inches (5.1 by 15.2 centimetres) balancing boards attached to the sides of the trestles.

== Rolling stock ==
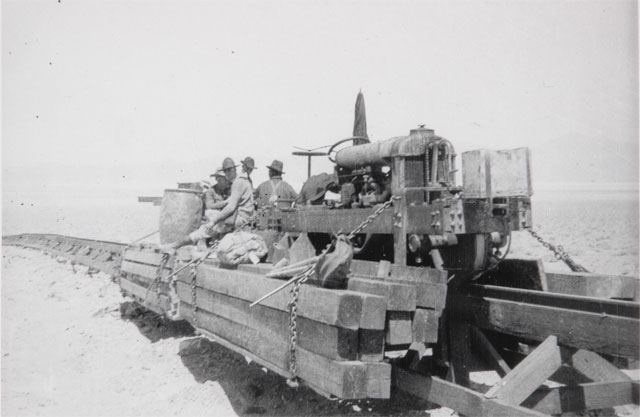
Epsom Salts Monorail 12 carrying construction materials

The locomotives and carriages had rectangular steel frames, in which a double-flanged steel wheel ran at either end. To balance the vehicle, it had spring-suspended steel rollers with 8 inches (20 cm) height and 8 inches (20 cm) diameter. The couplings between the carriages were reused from scrapped Los Angeles trams.

The load was stored in two containers on either side of the vehicles, to keep the center of gravity as low as possible, similar to loading the saddle bags of a mule. The locomotives had a design similar to the carriages. The first locomotive was battery-operated, but it was not powerful enough to tow loaded trains. Therefore, seven conventional Fordson tractors and one Buda tractor were modified to build articulated monorail locomotives.

Brakes were only installed on the locomotives, which caused recurring problems. Each locomotive could carry a maximum of 3,400 pounds (1.5t) while the carriages could carry 8,500 pounds (3.9t) each. The maximum downhill speed was 35 miles per hour (56 km/h) and in the flat area 30 miles per hour (48 km/h) could be reached. Normal operating speed was 8 miles per hour (13 km/h) on the uphill and up to 15 miles per hour (24 km/h) in the flat area.

== Remains ==
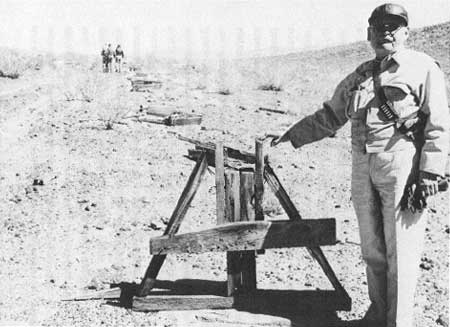
Remains of wooden supports in Wingate Pass

The monorail was disassembled for scrap in the late 1930s. Only some A frames remained. The largest part of the monorail is now in a restricted area of the China Lake Naval Weapons Center "B" Range. The mine, however, is inside the Death Valley National Park and accessible via the Fort Irwin National Training Center near Tecopa. The sidings of the Trona Railway can be reached by an unsurfaced track from California Highway 178. If carriages are parked on the sidings, these are easy to spot. There are some concrete foundations and ruins of houses in the area.

== See also ==
- Potash wars (California)
