= Potash wars (California) =

Conflict over potash deposits in the Searles Valley of California between 1910 and 1915

Searles Lake
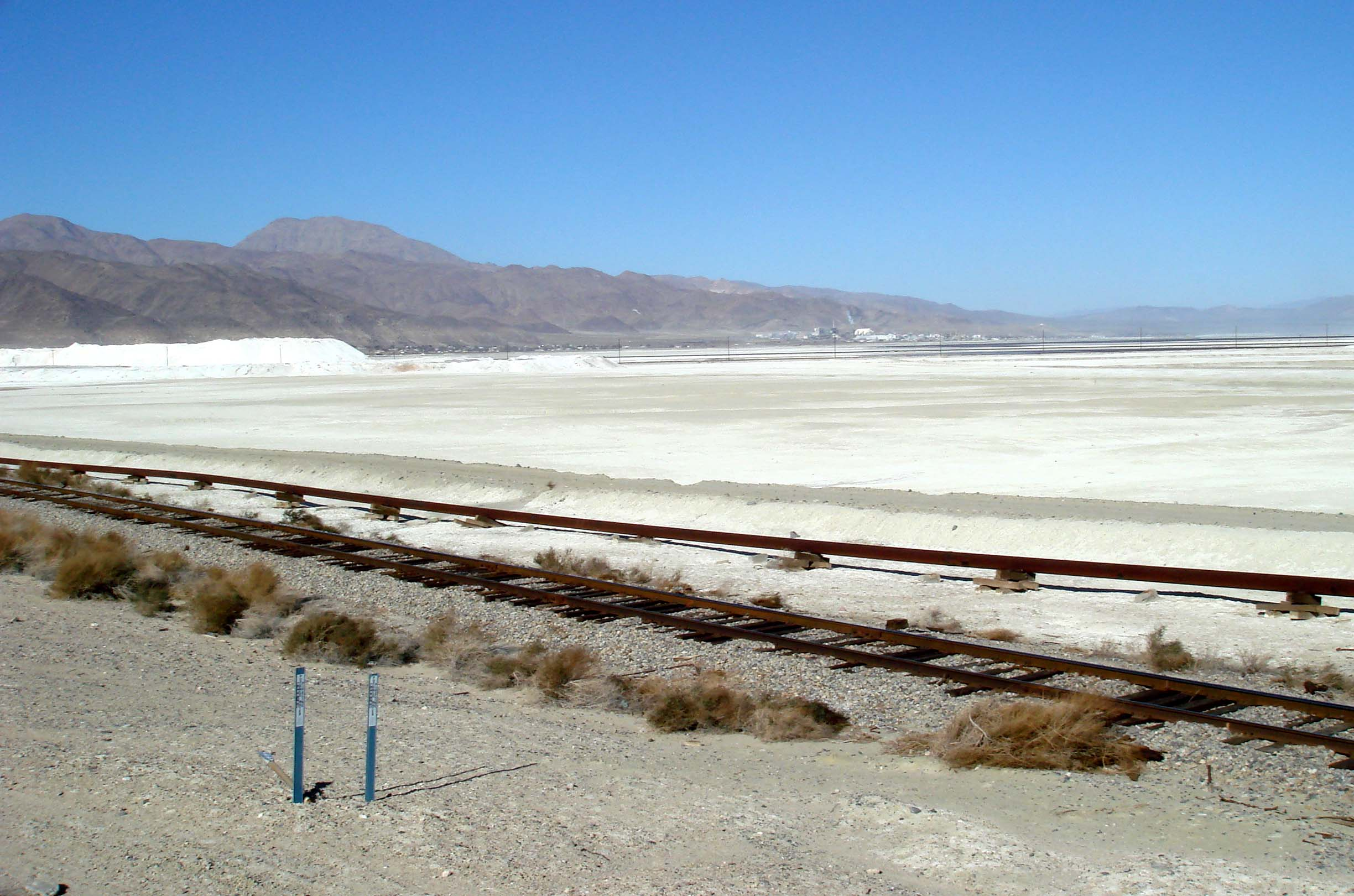
- Trona, California, abuts northwest of the dry Searles Lake bed.

- Location within California
- 35°45′28″N 117°22′38″W
- Location: Trona Rd at Center St., San Bernardino County, California

California Historical Landmark
- Designated: August 16, 1962
- Reference no.: 774

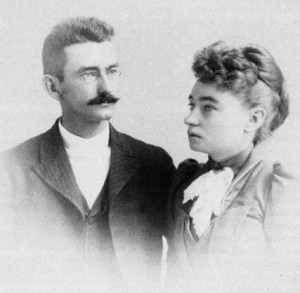
Stafford Wallace Austin and wife Mary Hunter Austin in 1910

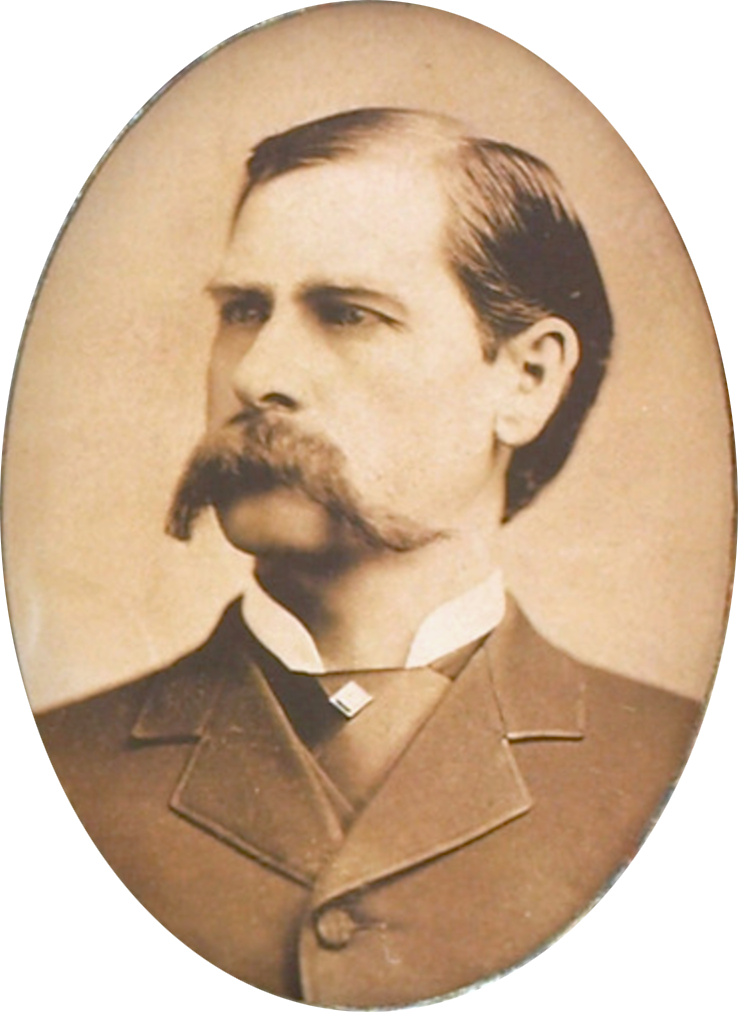
Wyatt Earp, part of the Potash wars

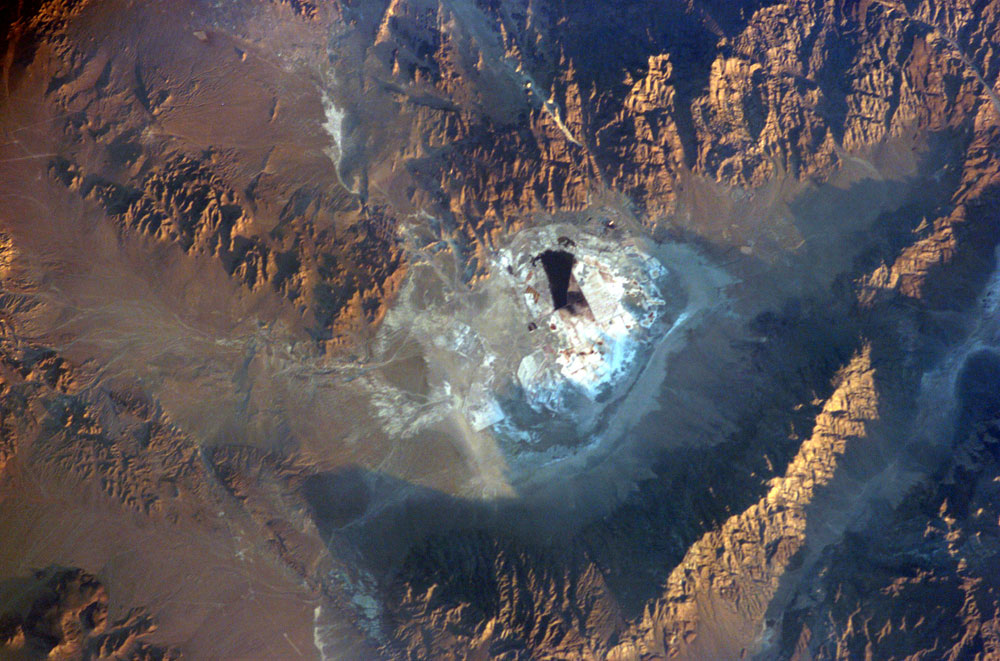
Searles Lake playa bounded by the Argus and Slate Mountains

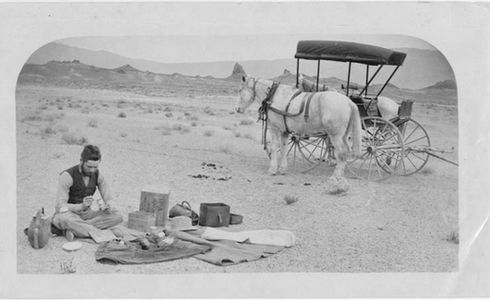
Dennis Searles in 1890 at Searles Lake

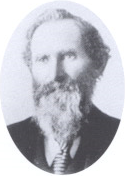
John W. Searles in 1873

The Potash wars were a series of conflicts over mineral rights that took place from 1910 to 1915 in the Searles Valley near Searles Lake, a dry lake (also called Slate Range Lake and Borax Lake), near the present-day town of Trona in San Bernardino County, California. The Potash wars gained national and international attention at the time due to the involvement of famous lawman Wyatt Earp and the importance of the valley's supply of potash, a term referring to various potassium salts widely used as crop fertilizers for which the Searles Valley was a major supplier in the 1910s.

== Background ==
In the mid-19th century and earlier, potash was produced almost exclusively in asheries from burning wood or kelp, but by 1861 Germans pioneered the mining of potassium salts and American farmers soon started using them as fertilizers on a wide scale.

In 1863, John W. Searles (1828–1897) discovered concentrated minerals in the saline deposits of the Slate Range in the Mojave Desert southwest of Death Valley. While looking for gold with a party led by Dr. S. G. George, John and his brother Dennis Searles discovered borax near a dry lakebed now known as Searles Lake. John and Dennis filed claims for the minerals in 1873. John filed paperwork for a federal land patent from the United States General Land Office in 1874 and began mining and selling the minerals. In 1878, Searles sold his interests and the patented land to the San Bernardino Borax Mining Company, founded by Francis Marion “Borax” Smith (1846–1931). Mining in the Searles Valley ended in 1895 when Smith moved his operations to Death Valley to work on the Pacific Coast Borax Company deposits. C. E. Dolbear founded the California Trona Company and filed 250 land claims for 160 acres around the Searles Valley in 1908. To add to its mining right, the California Trona Company leased 2,240 acres of patented lands for five years from the San Bernardino Borax Mining Company. To finance production, the California Trona Company mortgaged some of the land to the Foreign Mines Development Company, a subsidiary of the Consolidated Gold Fields Company of South Africa, for two million dollars. In return, the Trona Company gave the Foreign Mines Development Company 1,000 shares of its stock and a percentage of future gross sales.

The California Trona Company built two experimental plants to recover soda ash, potash, borax and sodium sulfate from the dry lake. The plants were not successful and troubles developed between the California Trona Company and the Foreign Mines Development Company. Claims of incompetence, fraud, and conspiracy in both companies were made. The Foreign Mines Development Company began legal action to sell the property to recover the mortgage debt on September 7, 1909. Stanford Wallace Austin was appointed receiver of the Trona Company.

By the beginning of the 20th century, Germany had a practically worldwide monopoly on potash production from its Magdeburg–Halberstadt rock salt basin. In June 1909, Americans attempted to buy the mineral not from the national syndicate but from independent producers at far lower prices. This led to the 1910 potash controversy between Germany and the United States over pricing, taxes, and tariffs. The production of potash at Searles Lake thus became a federal issue with the involvement of United States federal courts and President William Howard Taft. On March 26, 1912, President Taft sent a message to Congress about the Searles deposit at Borax Lake and his concern about Senator Reed Smoot's bill; he requested an amendment as concern with a placer claim bill.

== The war ==
On June 17, 1910, eight men were spotted heading to Borax Lake to claim jump land claimed by the California Trona Company. The men were unprepared for the remote, harsh Mojave Desert. The next day, Austin sent two employees to the lake, who found six of the claim jumpers in poor health with no water; the leader of the claim jumpers, Chas S. Davidson, died on the lake. According to an entry in Austin's diary dated June 20, 1910: "On Saturday afternoon when the boys were brought to Borax I furnished them with food and had them all sign a quitclaim deed relinquishing to California Trona."

On October 19, 1910, 44 new claim jumpers from Los Angeles arrived at Searles Lake, including their leader Henry E. Lee, an Oakland attorney. The group had surveyors, laborers and 20 armed guards/gunmen. The leader of the armed guards was Wyatt Earp, already a national celebrity for his work as a lawman in Tombstone, Arizona and other places across the western frontier. Beginning in 1901, Earp had gone to the desert from Los Angeles and made a number of mining claims. The party camped at the abandoned town of Slate Range City. To help stake their claim, five of Earp's armed men went to the nearby Austin claim in the morning. Earp told the group they were trespassers on the claim they owned. One of the men reportedly grabbed Earp's shotgun being held by one of his men. Earp pulled his automatic weapon and told the man to let go and he did. As calm returned, one man accidentally discharged his gun. On October 25, a U.S. Marshal arrived to arrest Earp and 27 of his men and served them with a summons from Judge Charles W. Slack to appear before the U.S. Circuit Court for contempt.

The October 1910 event came up in a 1916 court case. Nick Cataldo claimed that Earp was working at the request of Tom Lewis, a Los Angeles Police Department Commissioner. He also claimed that Austin and three armed men came into Earp's camp and told the Lee party to depart. Engineer Lou Rasor told how Earp grabbed one of Austin's men's rifles and then had a revolver put to his face.

In December 1912 Lee put a second crew together to go back and try to reclaim his land claim. With political unrest starting in Germany, which controlled the world potash market, and with the importance of potash in the U.S., on December 23, 1912, a federal court instructed that Lee's claims be guarded by United States officers, deputy sheriffs and the William J. Burns International Detective Agency. The action was taken due to the threat of Lee's armed men seeking to get back claims they said were taken from them in the rich potash and borax deposits of Searles Lake. The news reminded many of the claim jumpers and mining camp fights during the California gold rush in 1849. On December 27, 1912, Lee dropped his claim, as there was a time limit on him re-staking this old claim and he was not able to get his men to the old site and set up before the December 31 deadline.

== Aftermath ==
In 1913, the British-owned Consolidated Gold Fields of South Africa founded the American Trona Corporation, which acquired the California Trona Company due to the debt they held on the land. In 1914 the Trona Railway Company opened a 31-mile rail line from Trona to the Searles Station junction of the Southern Pacific Railroad. With access to the rail line, the products became successful. With the new boom, the American Trona Corporation founded the town of Trona, a company-owned town.

In 1917, the American Trona Corporation built the American Trona Corporation Building in San Pedro to process and store salt potash. The building was listed on the National Register of Historic Places in 1982.

From 1922 to 1928, the Epsom Salts Monorail crossed the Searles Lake on a wooden trestle. In 1926, American Trona became the American Potash and Chemical Company, which was sold in 1967 to Kerr-McGee Corporation, an Oklahoma oil and natural gas producer. On December 3, 1990, the land and production was sold by Kerr-McGee to North American Chemical for $210 million. The sale included the plants, railroad and vast mineral reserves. In 1998, IMC Global purchased the plant. In 2004, Sun Capital purchased the plant and renamed it Searles Valley Minerals Incorporated. In 2008, Nirma purchased the Searles Valley Minerals Incorporated plant.

On August 16, 1962, John W. Searles' discovery site was designated a California Historical Landmark. The California Historical Landmark marker reads:

- NO. 774 SEARLES LAKE BORAX DISCOVERY - John Searles discovered borax on the nearby surface of Searles Lake in 1862. With his brother Dennis, he formed the San Bernardino Borax Mining Company in 1873 and operated it until 1897. The chemicals in Searles Lake-borax, potash, soda ash, salt cake, and lithium-were deposited here by the runoff waters from melting ice-age glaciers, John Searles' discovery has proved to be the world's richest chemical storehouse, containing half the natural elements.

A 2000 E Clampus Vitus monument was placed to remember the Searles brothers. The marker reads:

- This monument commemorates two wagon routes used by the Searles brothers to haul borax from their plant on Borax Lake (now Searles Lake) to the railhead at Mojave. The southern route traveled west of the Trona Pinnacles to Searles' freight station at Garden City. This is the present route of the Trona Railway which connects with the Union Pacific at Searles Station. Garden City was a virtual oasis, providing food and shelter for the teamsters and a barn accommodating 100 mules. The western route went through Salt Wells Canyon (Poison Canyon) to a dry station one mile from the head of the canyon and on to garden City where both routes joined. It then continued through Garlock and connected with the road to Mojave. Erected 2000 by Billy Holcomb Chapter No. 1069, E Clampus Vitus in cooperation with Searles Valley Historical Society.

== Stafford Wallace Austin ==
Stafford Wallace Austin, born May 16, 1862, at Hilo, Hawaii. He graduated from the University of California, Berkeley. His first job was working for the United States General Land Office in Lone Pine, California. He witnessed the actions of the Los Angeles Department of Water and Power in the Owens Valley and wrote a report to the Secretary of the Interior about the issue. He departed the Land Office in 1906 and moved to Oakland, California to practice private law. In addition to his practice he was also a teacher. He married Mary Hunter Austin on May 18, 1891, who wrote the book The Land of Little Rain about the Owens Valley. They had one child, Ruth Austin (1891–1918). Austin and his brother came up with a new irrigation system and tried to market it, but were unsuccessful. His private law firm became the receiver for foreclosure proceedings of the California Trona Company. His response was to find a way for the unsuccessful California Trona Company to move out of debt. Much that is known about the Potash wars can be found in the daily diary he kept from December 16, 1909 to November 30, 1917. He was paid $270 per month by the Foreign Mines Development Company. Austin had a test drill done and found that the mineral-rich layers ran about 100 feet under the dry lake. Austin later served as Trona city's first postmaster, appointed on March 27, 1914. He died on September 14, 1931, in Los Angeles, California. The Austins designed and built a home in Independence, California which later became California Historical Landmark No. 229.

== John Wemple Searles ==
John Wemple Searles was born on November 16, 1828, in Tribes Hill, New York. His parents were George Searles (1802–1851) and Helen Wemple (1803–?). Both were from Montgomery County, New York. John was the oldest of five children. John Searles was one of the many '49ers that came to California in a wagon train looking for gold. His first claim was in 1852 at Indian Creek in Shasta County, California, with his brother Dennis. The Searles brothers mined and farmed, but in 1858 they lost their mining claims and farm in a debt lawsuit. To start fresh they traveled to Southern California after hearing about the gold and silver finds in the Slate Range. Near the Slate Range was a dry lake thought to be only salt and sodium carbonate. Searles heard that there may be useful borax at the lake, so they took some samples to San Francisco in 1863, but were told by a dishonest appraiser that there was no borax. However, Searles became suspicious after being followed on the way home. They had some good gold and silver finds in the Slate Range, but in the end, they again lost everything after another debt lawsuit in 1870. John was seriously injured by a California grizzly bear in 1871 but survived. John Searles married Mary Ann Covington (1851–1923) in Los Angeles, California, on January 1, 1873. They had one son they named Dennis (after John's brother), who was born February 27, 1874. They changed their focus from mining to the deposits at the Slate Range dry lake that now bears their name. The next test showed that the lake was rich in borax. The Searles brothers with other partners filed claims to 640 acres in 1873. They founded the new San Bernardino Borax Mining Company and built a plant to refine the borax and haul it out, just like the better known 20 Mule Team Borax team. Claim jumpers tried to get in on the action, but the harsh desert drove them out. Eventually, the high cost of refining and transporting the borax closed the company. In 1878, Searles sold his interests and the claim patents for the dry lake to the San Bernardino Borax Mining Company. Searles died on October 7, 1897, at the age of 68, in St. Helena, California. John and Mary are interred at Saint Helena Cemetery in Napa County, California.

== See also ==
- Panamint Valley
- Indian Wells Valley
- California water wars
