= Slate Range =

Slate Range may refer to:

- Slate Range (Alberta)
- Slate Range (California)
