= Trona High School =

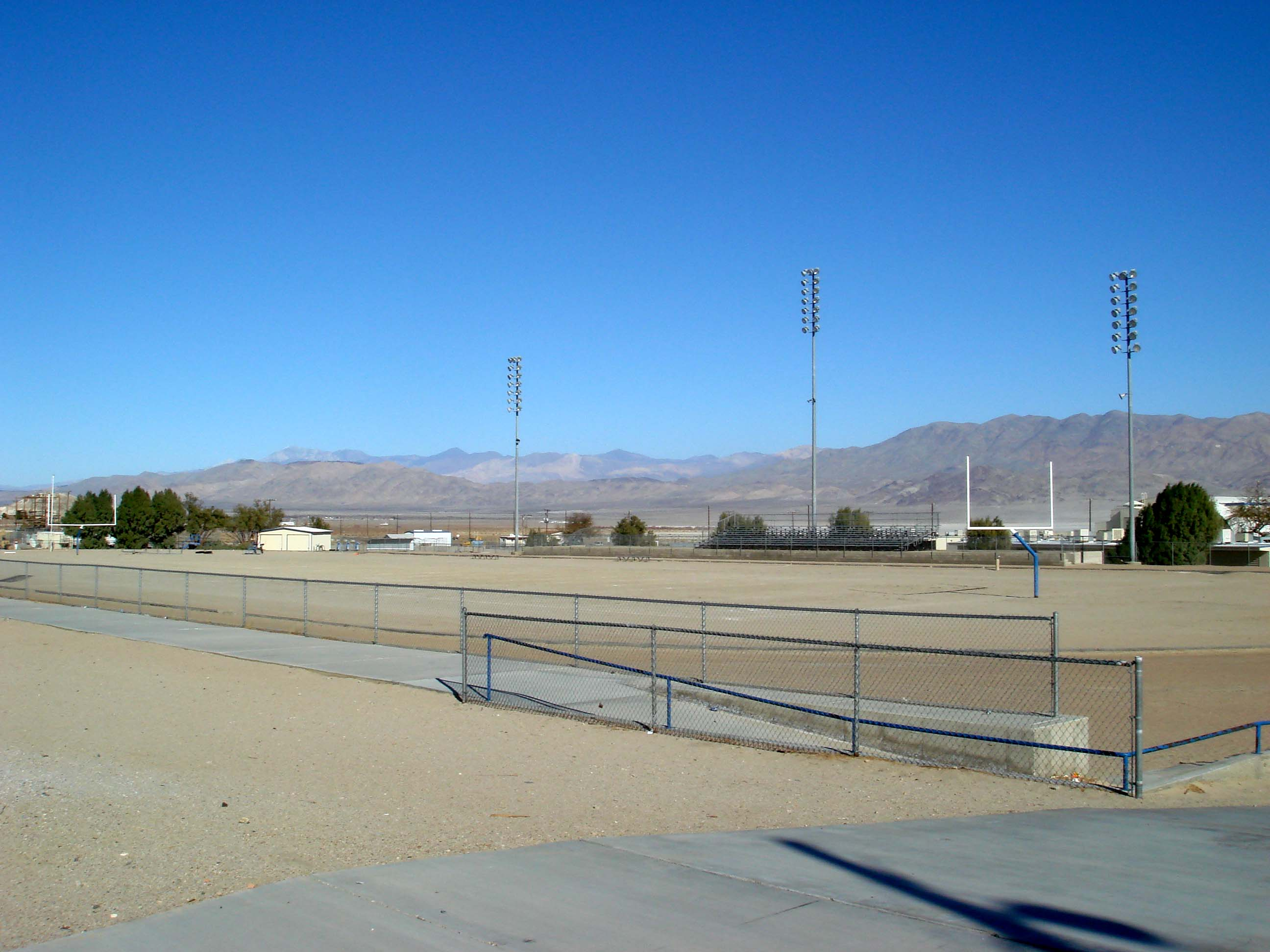
- Trona's all-dirt football field

Location
- 83600 Trona Road; Trona, San Bernardino, California 93562; United States; 35.770624°N 117.369518°W

Information
- Type: Public
- School district: Trona Joint Unified School District
- Principal: Lauretta Eldridge
- Grades: 7-12
- Enrollment: 116 (2022-2023)
- Colors: Blue and white
- Athletics conference: CIF Central Section
- Mascot: Tornado
- Team name: Tornadoes
- Website: http://trona.tjusd.net/home

Trona High School is a public high school in Trona, California, United States.

== History ==
Trona High School opened in January 1942 and its first graduating class was in June 1942. Its first yearbook was published in 1943 and included a photograph of the 1942 graduates.

== Football Field ==
Trona's football field is all-dirt and is known as "The Pit". The high school maintenance crew keeps the field free of stones and they regularly drag the field to keep the surface from getting too hard. The field is watered on game day and leveled to ensure that the playing surface is safe for all participants.

Until several years ago an annual game was played against Boron High School. Referred to as the Borax Bowl by some, the game was a matchup of two mining towns that are world leaders in producing potash and borax, minerals used in a number of products.
