= Searles Valley Minerals =

U.S. mining and chemical company

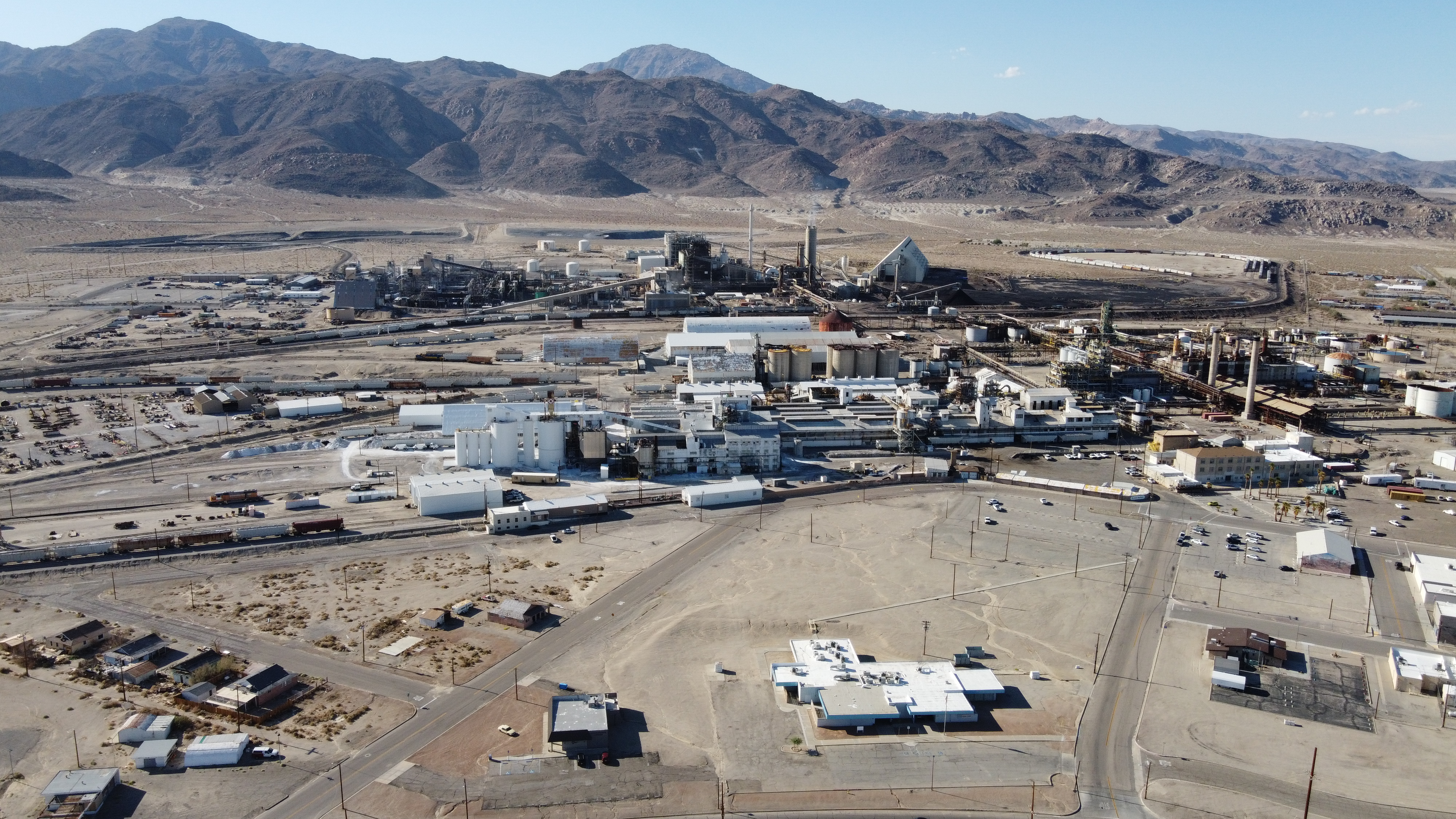
The Searles Valley Minerals Plant (front) and the Argus Cogeneration Plant (back)

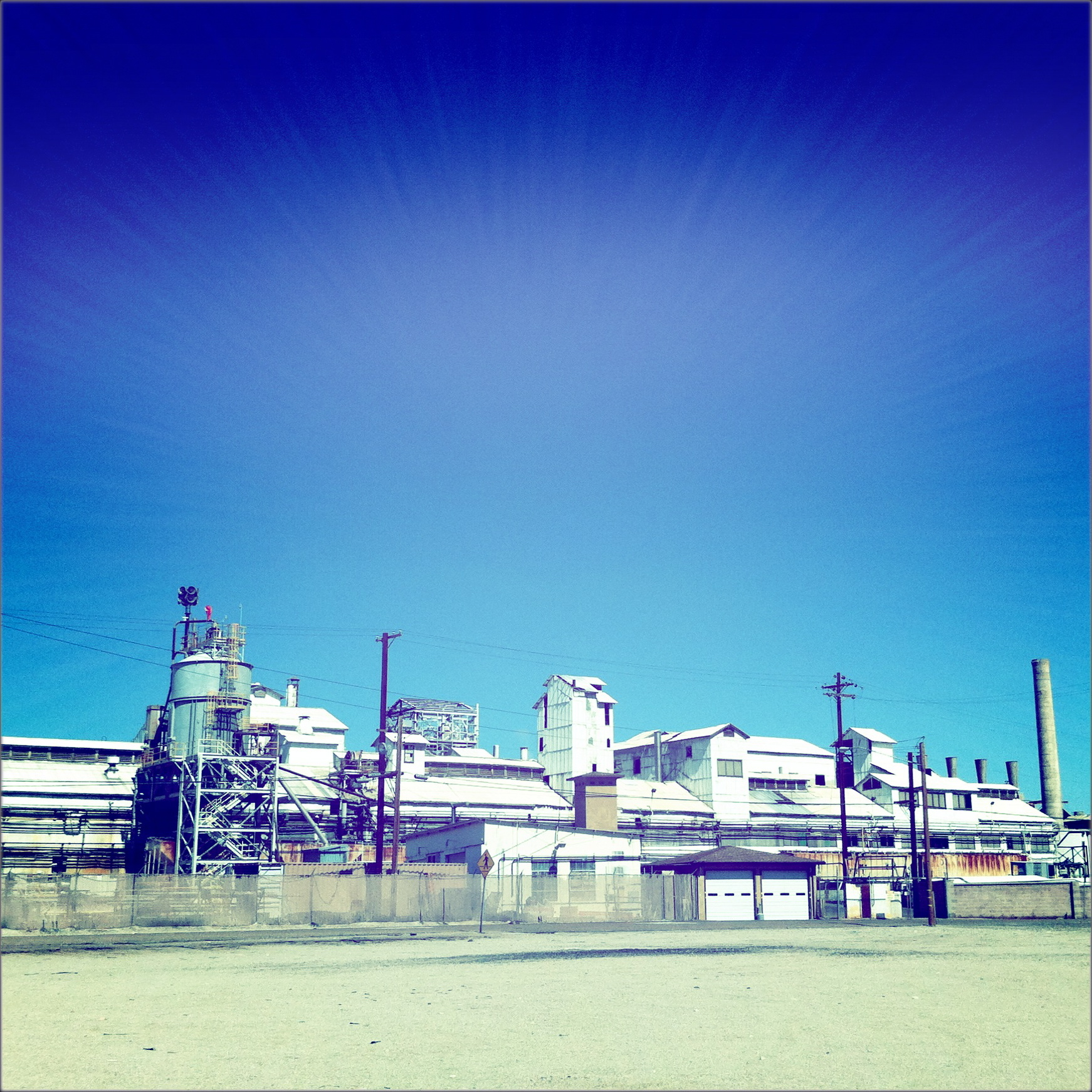
Searles Valley Minerals plant in Trona, California

Searles Valley Minerals Inc. is a raw materials mining and production company with corporate offices in Overland Park, Kansas. It is owned by the Indian company Nirma. It has major operations in the Searles Valley centered in Trona, California where it is the town's largest employer. The company produces borax, boric acid, soda ash, salt cake, and salt. It also owns the Trona Railway.

The Trona facility extracts and ships 1.75 million tons of chemicals per year.

== History ==
The mining, production, and assets of the present day Searles Valley Minerals Inc. have a long and varied history.

When John Wemple Searles arrived in the area in the 1860s, he was looking for gold and silver to mine. Instead he found a white crystalline powder, borax, in the dry Searles Lake bed. In 1873, he went into production as the San Bernardino Borax Mining Company to mine borax. Long mule teams were used to haul borax in wagons to San Pedro, until the much closer settlement of Mojave was used after the Southern Pacific Railroad reached it in 1876.

In 1895 The San Bernardino Borax Mining Company was sold by Searles to the Pacific Coast Borax Company, owned by Francis "Borax King" Smith. He shut down production at the company's section of Searles Lake the next year.

=== American Trona Company ===
The American Trona Company was founded in 1913 by the British-owned Consolidated Gold Fields of South Africa company. In 1914 the company completed the Trona Railway line from Searles Station south to a junction with the Southern Pacific Railroad. Also in 1914, the American Trona Corporation established the company-owned town of Trona, named for crystals of soda ash formed by the evaporation of chemical-rich water commonly found in the lake bed. The production of potash began in 1915.

In 1917, construction was completed on the American Trona Corporation Building in San Pedro, to process and store salt potash. In 1926, after becoming the American Potash & Chemical Corporation, it began producing borax, soda ash, and sodium sulfate. Productions of these chemicals continued to expand until the 1980s.

=== Post-WW II ===
After World War II, American Potash had labor relations problems due to allegations that Latino workers were paid lower wages than White workers. Later, Latino workers were promoted to managerial positions. In 1962 the company received nationwide recognition and an award for its innovative solvent extraction process to recover boric acid and potassium sulfate from weak brines.

In 1974 American Potash and Chemical was acquired by Kerr-McGee. However they didn’t want to own the company town and sold it. They cut production in half in 1982 and instituted massive layoffs.

Kerr-McGee sold the Searles Valley production facilities in 1990, to capital investors D. George Harris and Associates, which formed the North American Chemical Company. Ownership changed again in 1998 when IMC Global corporation acquired North American Chemical Company.

=== 21st century ===
In 2004 when Sun Capital, LLC purchased IMC Global corporation, the North American Chemical Company facilities at Trona and Westend were renamed Searles Valley Minerals, Inc.

In November 2007, Karnavati Holdings, a subsidiary of the Indian corporation Nirma Limited based in Ahmedabad (India), purchased Searles Valley Minerals corporation from Sun Capital Partners.

Searles Valley Minerals Inc. is part of Climate VISION (Voluntary Innovative Sector Initiatives: Opportunities Now), a public/private partnership which is seeking to reduce US industry greenhouse gas emissions by 18 percent between 2002 and 2012. As it operates on government owned land, Searles Valley Minerals Inc. pays royalties of millions of dollars each year to both the federal and state governments. Much of those royalties cover the expenses of local school districts.

In June 2026, Searles Valley Minerals filed for Chapter 11 bankruptcy protection in an effort to initiate a court-supervised sale of all of its assets.

== Argus Cogeneration Plant ==
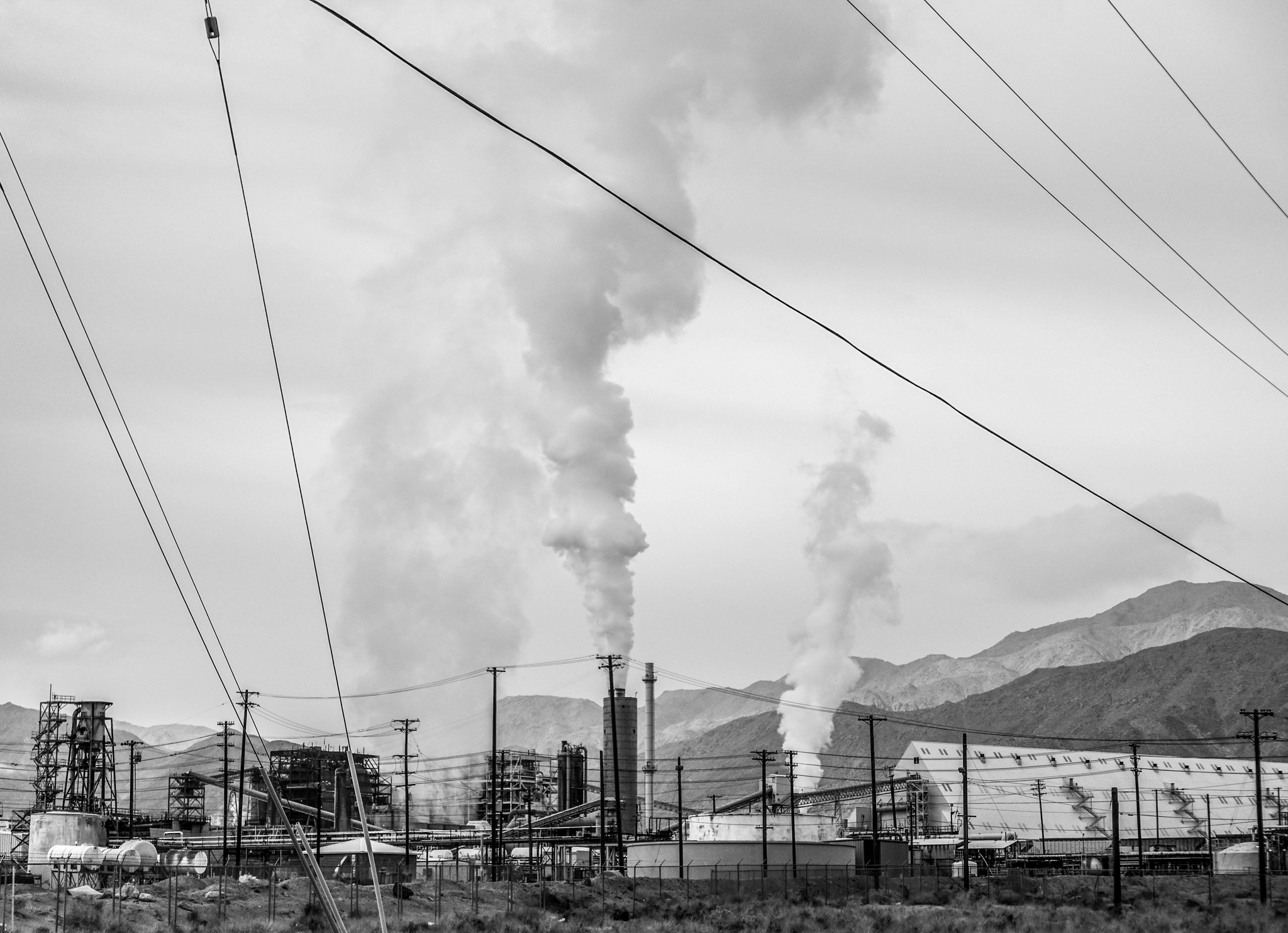
The Argus Cogeneration Plant of Searles Valley Minerals.

The Argus Cogeneration Plant is a coal-fired power station located adjacent to the mineral processing plant in Trona, California. The power station has nameplate capacity of 63 MW and produced 296 GWh of electricity in 2018. It is the last coal-fired power station still operating in California.

Unit 1 was commissioned in 1978 and has a nameplate capacity of 63 MW. Unit 2 was commissioned in January 1991 and had a nameplate capacity of 103 MW before ceasing operations on October 2, 2014.

The power station is located at the coordinates 35°45′54″N 117°22′56″W.

In 2025, the owner announced a plan to partially replace it with solar thermal technology from GlassPoint Solar.

== Environmental problems ==
The California Department of Fish and Wildlife found that migrating birds stopping at the Trona plant brine ponds have died from salt toxicosis, salt encrustation, and oiling. In 2005, Searles agreed on a mitigation plan which "allows for the continuing take of birds (not to exceed an average of 241 birds/year) in exchange for continued bird protection and rescue efforts and a contribution of up to $550,000 (plus $10K/year for maintenance for 40 years) for a 100+ acre wetlands creation project at the south end of Owens Lake," about 55 miles north.

There are allegations of arsenic poisoning of plant workers. SVM argued to the State Water Resources Control Board, that concentration of total dissolved solids, chlorides, sodium and other minerals are higher in natural ephemeral pools than in the company's depleted brine ponds.

The Searles Lake brine is rich in arsenic, and a unique anaerobic, extremely haloalkaliphilic bacterium which uses arsenic for respiration has been isolated from the mud.

== See also ==
- Energy in California
