= Slate Range (California) =

Mountain range in California, United States

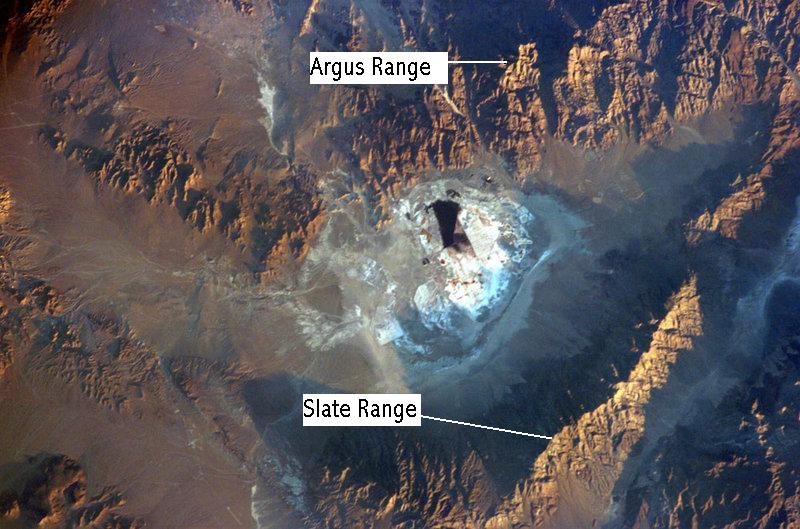
- Slate Range, near Searles Dry Lake in the Mojave Desert

Highest point
- Elevation: 1,583 m (5,194 ft)

Geography
- Location within California
- Country: United States
- State: California
- District: San Bernardino County
- Range coordinates: 35°36′31.855″N 117°12′40.174″W
- Topo map: USGS Pilot Knob Valley West

The Slate Range is located in the Mojave Desert in San Bernardino County, California, southwest of Death Valley and east of Trona.

The mountains lie to the east of Searles Lake and the Argus Range at the southern end of the Panamint Range. The southern part of the range lies in the Naval Air Weapons Station China Lake, which is off-limit to the general public. Manly Pass lies at the northern end of the Slate Range, with Layton Pass at the southern end.

== See also ==
- Mountain ranges of the Mojave Desert
- North American desert flora
- Potash wars (California)
