= Nirma =

Indian conglomerate

- Type: Private
- Industry: Fast-moving consumer goods
- Founded: 1969
- Founder: Karsanbhai Patel
- Headquarters: Ahmedabad, Gujarat, India
- Products: Detergent, Soaps, Cements, Putty, Soda ash, Injectables
- Subsidiaries: Nirma Ltd; Nuvoco Vistas Corporation; Searles Valley Minerals Inc.; Aculife Healthcare; Alivus Life Sciences
- Website: www.nirma.co.in

Nirma is a conglomerate based in Ahmedabad, India, involved in the manufacture of various products, including detergents, soaps, cement, cosmetics, salt, soda ash, linear alkyl benzene, and injectables. It was founded in 1969 by Karsanbhai Patel, a laboratory technician, as a one-man operation.

== History ==
In 1969, Dr. Karsanbhai Patel, a chemist at the Gujarat Government's Department of Mining and Geology manufactured phosphate-free synthetic detergent powder, and started selling it locally. The new yellow powder was priced at ₹3.50 per kg, at a time when HUL's Surf was priced at ₹13. Nirma sold well in Ruppur (Gujarat), Patel's hometown. He started packing the formulation in a 10x10 ft room in his house. Patel named the powder Nirma, after his daughter Nirupama. He was able to sell about 15-20 packets a day on his way to the office on bicycle, some 15 km away. By 1985, Nirma washing powder had become one of the most popular household detergents in many parts of the country, which was aided in part by the popular "Washing Powder Nirma" television advertisement.

By 1999, Nirma was a major consumer brand, offering a range of detergents, soaps and personal care products. The group also set up a healthcare subsidiary called Nirlife to manufacture intravenous fluids.

In November 2007, Nirma purchased American raw materials company Searles Valley Minerals Inc., making it among the top seven soda ash manufacturers in the world.

Nirma Group started cement manufacturing in 2014 from a single plant in Nimbol, with a newly established company Nuvoco Vistas Corporation. In 2016, Nirma acquired Lafarge India's cement assets for $1.4 billion. In February 2020, Nirma acquired Emami Cement for ₹5,500 crore (US$742.24 million).

In September 2023, Nirma acquired a 75% stake in Glenmark Life Sciences from Glenmark for ₹5,652 crore (US$680 million). In 2024, Glenmark Life Sciences was renamed Alivus Life Sciences.

== CSR ==
The company established Nirma University in 1995, which is managed by the Nirma Education and Research Foundation (NERF). It also runs the Nirmalabs education program, which has been dedicated to training and supporting entrepreneurs since 2004.

== See also ==
- Nirma University of Science & Technology
