= Trona Pinnacles =

Geological formation in California

- IUCN category III (natural monument or feature)
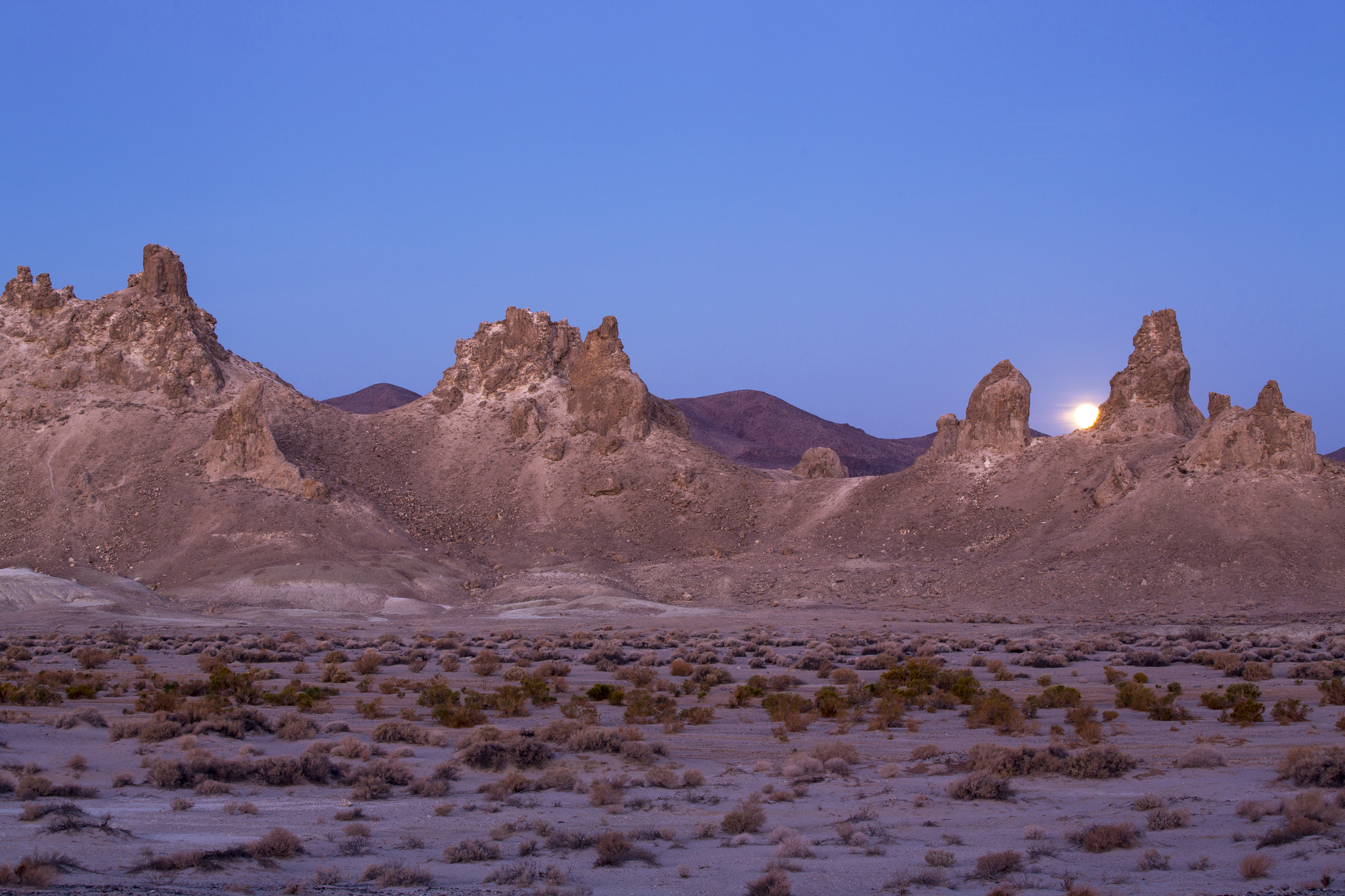

- Location within California
- Location: San Bernardino County, California, United States
- Nearest city: Trona, California
- Coordinates: 35.6168°N 117.3703°W
- Area: 3,800 acres (15 km^{2})
- Established: 1968
- Governing body: Bureau of Land Management

U.S. National Natural Landmark
- Designated: 1967

The Trona Pinnacles are an unusual geological feature in the California Desert National Conservation Area. The landscape consists of more than 500 tufa spires (porous rock formed as a deposit when springs interact with other bodies of water), some as high as 140 ft (43 m), rising from the bed of the Searles Lake (dry) basin. The pinnacles vary in size and shape from short and squat to tall and thin, and are composed primarily of calcium carbonate (tufa). They now sit isolated and slowly crumbling away near the south end of the valley, surrounded by many square miles of flat, dried mud and with stark mountain ranges at either side.

== Geography ==
The Trona Pinnacles, at an elevation of 1,800 ft (550 m) above sea level, are located approximately 10.0 mi (16.1 km) south of Trona, California. Access to the site is from a BLM dirt road (RM143) that leaves State Highway 178, about 7.7 mi (12 km) east of the intersection of State Highway 178 and the Trona-Red Mountain Road. The 5.0 mi (8 km) long dirt road from State Highway 178 to the Pinnacles is usually accessible to 2-wheel drive vehicles; however, the road may be closed during the winter months after a heavy rain.

The Pinnacles are located within 3,800 acres (15 km^{2}) of federal land managed by the Bureau of Land Management. The Trona Pinnacles are inside a BLM Area of Critical Environmental Concern (ACEC) designated to protect and preserve unique resources.

== Geology ==
During the Pleistocene, massive runoff spilled from the Sierra Nevada into a chain of inland seas. The system of interconnected lakes stretched from Mono Lake to Death Valley and included Searles Lake.

Deep beneath Searles Lake, calcium-rich groundwater and alkaline lake water combined to grow tufa formations. Similar (modern) formations can be found today at Mono Lake to the north.

Known as tufa pinnacles, these strange shapes formed underwater 10,000 to 100,000 years ago. The pinnacles did not all form at the same time. They are divided by age and elevation into three groups. The groups are dubbed the northern, middle, and southern groups because they formed during the three ice ages.

The northern group is the youngest at 11,000 to 25,000 years old. These are the best examples of what are known as tufa towers. The northern group also include shapes called tombstones, ridges, and cones. The small middle group claims only 100 spires, but boasts the tallest "tower", rising 140 ft (43 m). The southern group includes 200 tufa formations aged 32,000 to 100,000 years old.

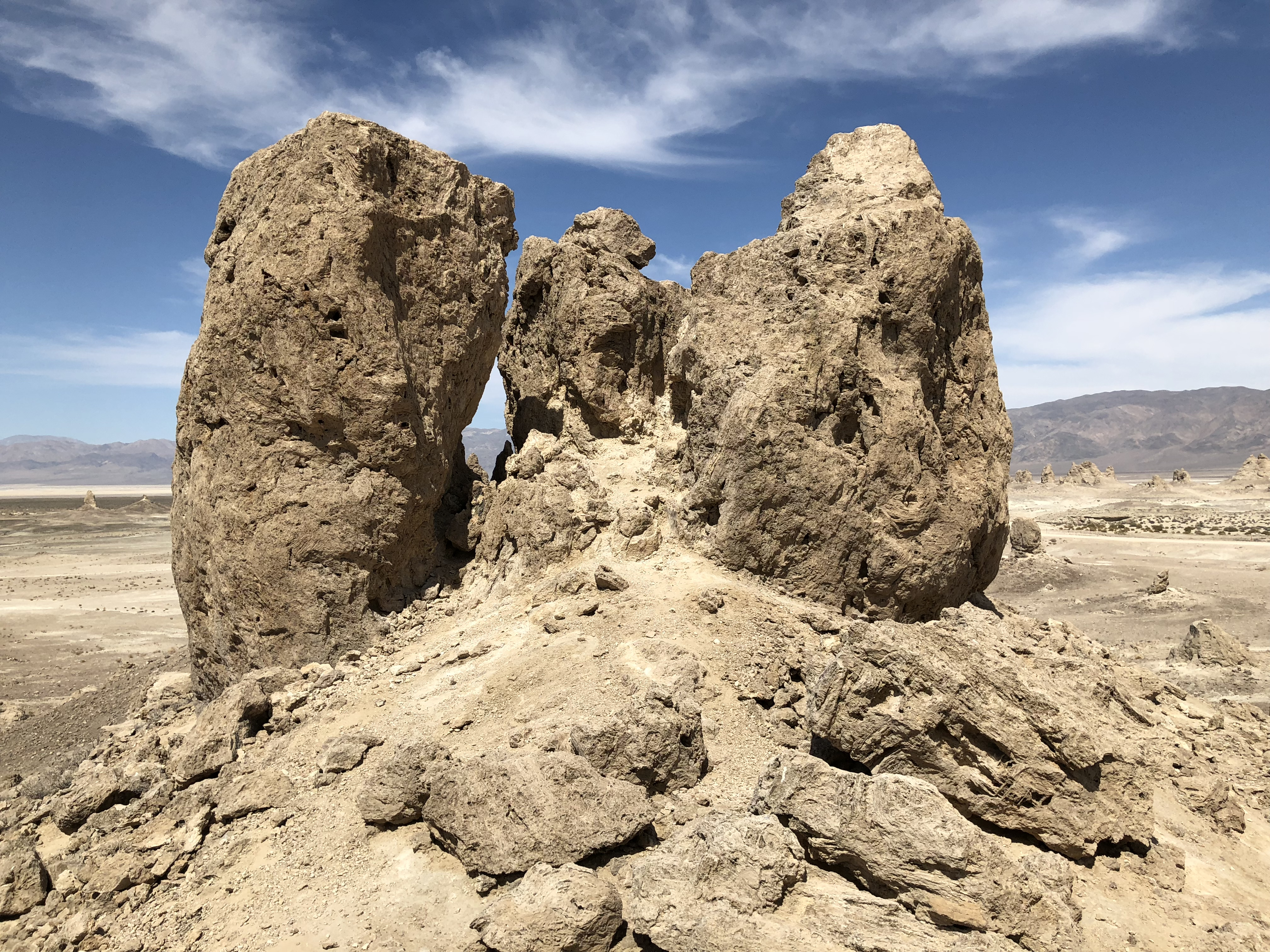
A close-up of one of the major clusters of pinnacles. June 2018.

People have historically given names to the strange forms. These ancient spires were once dubbed "Cathedral City". Geologically, the pinnacles are classified into four general shapes. Towers are taller than they are wide and rise 30–40 ft (9–12 m). Tombstones are stubby and squat and rise 20–30 feet (6–9 m). Most tombstones are in the northernmost tufa formations. Ridges are massive toothy tufa ruins. Trona has three ridges, one in the northern tufa cluster and two in the middle group. One ridge is 800 ft (240 m) long and 500 feet (150 m) wide and 140 ft (43 m) tall. Cones are less than 10 ft (3 m) tall. Dumpy and mounded, cone shapes lie scattered throughout the Trona Pinnacles.

== In media ==
The Pinnacles are recognizable in more than a dozen hit movies. Over thirty film projects a year are shot among the tufa pinnacles, including backdrops for car commercials and sci-fi movies and television series such as Battlestar Galactica, Star Trek V: The Final Frontier, Disney's Dinosaur, The Gate II: Trespassers, Lost in Space, and Planet of the Apes. Music videos for Rihanna's 2016 single "Sledgehammer" and Lady Gaga's 2020 single "Stupid Love". The album cover for Phoebe Bridgers' studio album "Punisher" was shot at the Pinnacles.
