= Trona, San Bernardino County, California =

Unincorporated community in San Bernardino County, California, United States

Trona
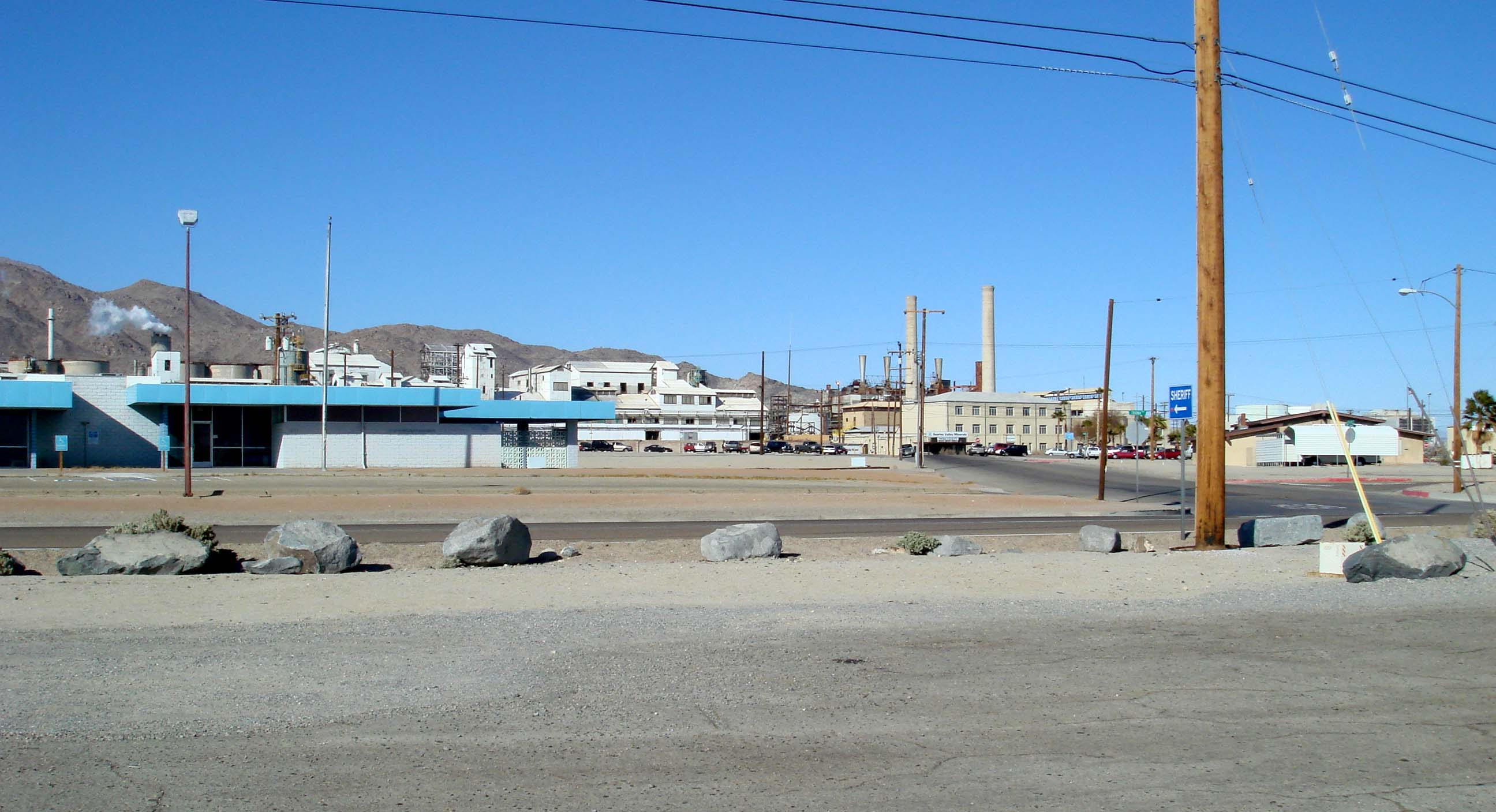
- Searles Valley Minerals chemical plant dominates Trona

- Location within the state of California Trona (the United States)
- Coordinates: 35°45′55″N 117°22′58″W
- Country: United States
- State: California
- County: San Bernardino
- Time zone: UTC-8 (Pacific (PST))
  - Summer (DST): UTC-7 (PDT)
- ZIP codes: 93562

Trona is an unincorporated community in San Bernardino County, California. In 2015 it had a population of approximately 1,900. Trona is at the western edge of Searles Lake, a dry lake bed in Searles Valley, southwest of Death Valley. The town takes its name from the mineral trona, abundant in the lakebed. It is about 170 miles (274 km) northeast of Los Angeles, on State Route 178. The ZIP code is 93562.

Trona is known for its isolation and desolation, as well as the nearby Trona Pinnacles. The local school plays on a dirt football field because the searing heat and highly saline soil kills grass. At one point it boasted an 18-hole golf course that was all sand except for the "greens", which were a softer grade of brown colored dirt.

== History ==
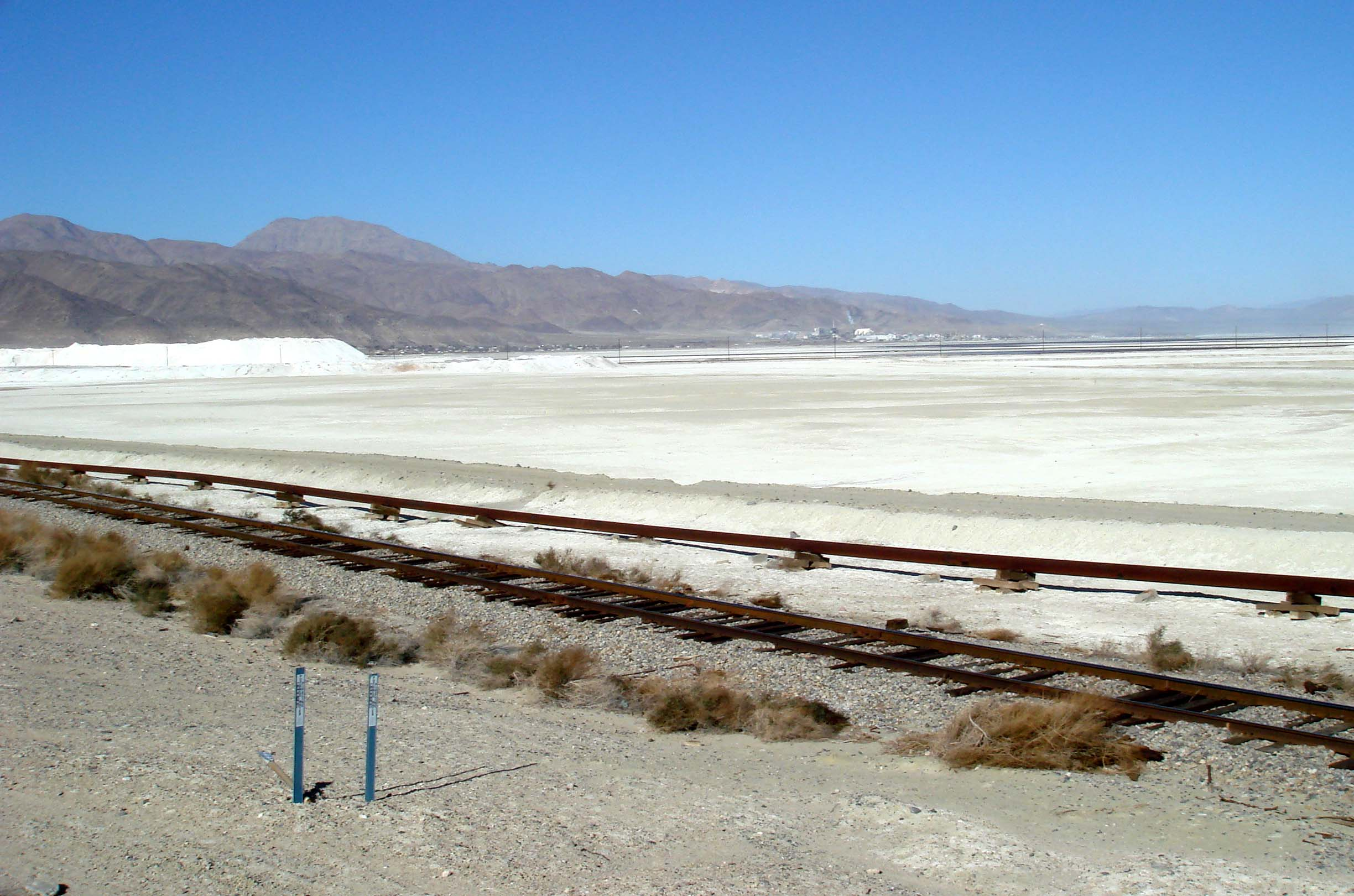
Trona, in the distance, on the edge of Searles Lake

In 1863, John Searles began mining for borax on the dry bed of the lake that what would later be named Searles Lake after him.

Trona was officially established in 1913, as a self-contained company town, wholly operated by its resident mining company to house employees. Employees were paid in company scrip instead of cash. The mining company also built a library, a scrip-accepting for-profit grocery store, a school, basic housing, and minimal recreation facilities. The Trona Railway was built in 1913–14 to provide the town with a rail connection to the Southern Pacific (now the Union Pacific) line at Searles. The railway still operates today.

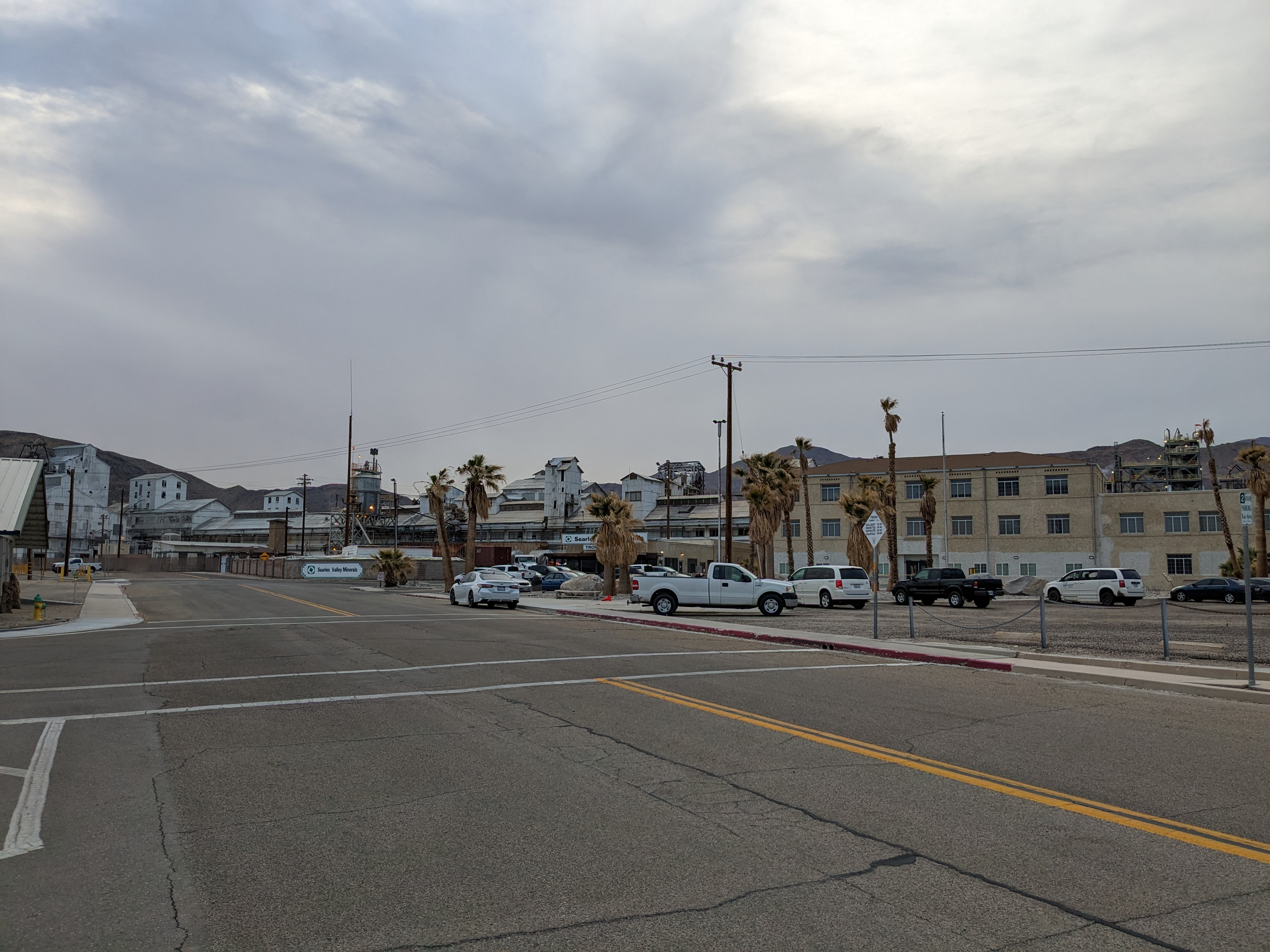
Searles Valley Mineral Company Facility

Economic booms and busts followed. Its most notable boom occurred during World War I, when Trona was the only reliable American source of potash, an important element used in the production of gunpowder. In 1974, the company, now known as American Potash, was bought by Kerr-McGee, who did not want a company town. Their attempts to make everybody leave were resisted by the inhabitants.

Today, Searles Valley Minerals Inc.'s soda ash processing plant remains the largest firm in town. Other operations nearby include evaporative salt extraction from the dry lake bed's surface, and a lime quarry. Searles Valley Minerals is the largest employer in Trona, and many employees live in Ridgecrest, California, commuting daily to Trona.

Since its heyday, Trona's population has decreased, with more and more services relocating to the nearest town, Ridgecrest.

== Geography ==
The same collection of geologic forces which created the Searles Valley where Trona sits also created the natural resource of Searles Dry Lake, which contains rich deposits of chemicals, including dozens of minerals.

Located a few miles to the south are the Trona Pinnacles, an unusual landscape consisting of more than 500 tufa spires, some as high as 140 feet, rising from the bed of the Searles Lake basin.

Trona is a seismically active area, and was heavily affected by the 2019 Ridgecrest earthquakes. Trona is located in the Eastern California Shear Zone, a seismically active zone that accommodates up to 25% of the fault movement between the Pacific and North American plates.

== Climate ==
Trona has an arid climate with cool winters and hot summers. Average January temperatures are a maximum of 58.2 °F (14.6 °C) and a minimum of 32.9 °F (0.5 °C). Average July temperatures are a maximum of 105.5 °F (40.8 °C) and a minimum of 73.3 °F (22.9 °C). There are an average of 140.1 days with highs of 90 °F (32 °C) or higher and an average of 45.3 days with lows of 32 °F (0 °C) or lower. The record high temperature was 118 °F (48 °C) on August 13, 1933; July 25, 1943; May 27, 1951; and June 29, 1956. The record low temperature was 8 °F (−13 °C) on December 23, 1990.

Average annual precipitation is 3.98 inches (101 mm) and there are an average of 18 days annually with measurable precipitation. The wettest year was 1941 with 9.01 inches (229 mm) and the driest year was 1953 with .41 inches (10 mm). The most precipitation in one month was 5.01 inches (127 mm) in January 1995. The most precipitation in 24 hours was 2.25 inches (57 mm) on August 15, 1984. Snowfall is very rare in Trona, averaging only 0.3 inches (7.6 mm), but there was 9.0 inches (230 mm) in January 1974.

Climate data for Trona, California (1991–2020 normals, extremes 1920–present)
Month	Jan	Feb	Mar	Apr	May	Jun	Jul	Aug	Sep	Oct	Nov	Dec	Year
Record high °F (°C)	83 (28)	88 (31)	93 (34)	102 (39)	111 (44)	118 (48)	119 (48)	118 (48)	116 (47)	107 (42)	96 (36)	83 (28)	119 (48)
Mean daily maximum °F (°C)	60.1 (15.6)	66.1 (18.9)	73.2 (22.9)	80.8 (27.1)	90.1 (32.3)	100.3 (37.9)	107.3 (41.8)	105.7 (40.9)	98.9 (37.2)	85.6 (29.8)	70.9 (21.6)	59.8 (15.4)	83.2 (28.4)
Daily mean °F (°C)	47.4 (8.6)	52.6 (11.4)	59.2 (15.1)	65.8 (18.8)	74.7 (23.7)	84.1 (28.9)	90.5 (32.5)	89.8 (32.1)	82.9 (28.3)	70.0 (21.1)	56.5 (13.6)	47.0 (8.3)	68.4 (20.2)
Mean daily minimum °F (°C)	34.7 (1.5)	39.0 (3.9)	45.2 (7.3)	50.7 (10.4)	59.3 (15.2)	67.9 (19.9)	73.7 (23.2)	73.8 (23.2)	66.8 (19.3)	54.5 (12.5)	42.1 (5.6)	34.2 (1.2)	53.5 (11.9)
Record low °F (°C)	10 (−12)	7 (−14)	20 (−7)	25 (−4)	36 (2)	41 (5)	54 (12)	50 (10)	40 (4)	23 (−5)	7 (−14)	8 (−13)	7 (−14)
Average precipitation inches (mm)	0.77 (20)	0.91 (23)	0.48 (12)	0.11 (2.8)	0.07 (1.8)	0.02 (0.51)	0.09 (2.3)	0.06 (1.5)	0.09 (2.3)	0.20 (5.1)	0.24 (6.1)	0.58 (15)	3.62 (92)
Average precipitation days (≥ 0.01 in)	2.8	3.2	2.0	0.9	0.5	0.2	0.9	0.7	0.6	1.0	1.3	1.9	16.0
Source: NOAA

== Education ==
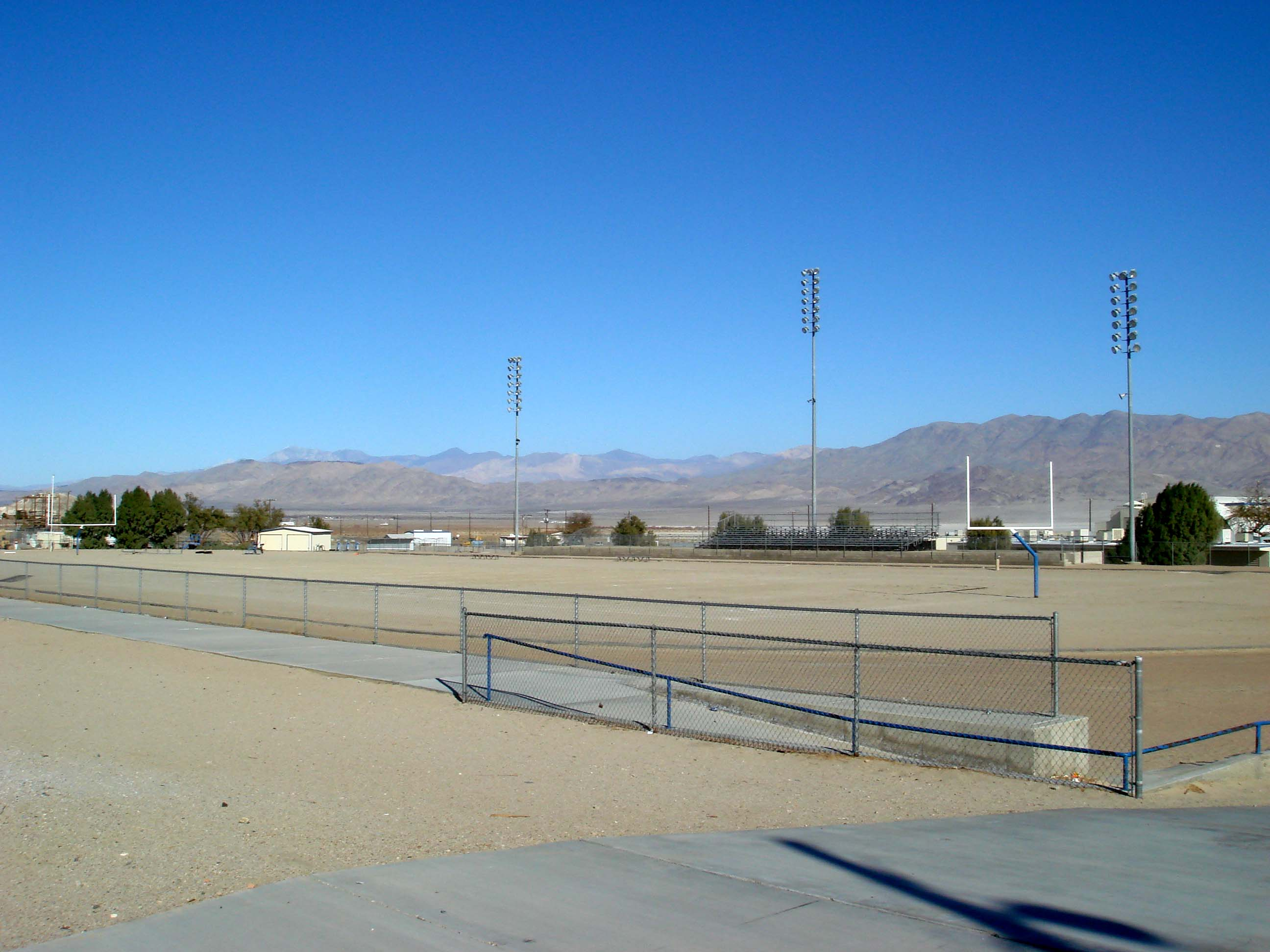
Trona High School's unique dirt football field

K-12 public education is provided through the Trona Joint Unified School District. The California Department of Education indicates that 255 students were enrolled in the district's schools during the 2015-16 academic year, down from 576 students in 1996-97 (the earliest data available on their website).

Trona Joint Unified School District operates two schools: Trona Elementary School and Trona High School. There is no junior high or middle school; instead, the high school houses 7th and 8th grades in addition to the traditional 9th through 12th grades. Course offerings at Trona High are supplemented by online classes offered by California State University, Dominguez Hills and Cerro Coso Community College in Ridgecrest, California.

95 students were enrolled at Trona High during the 2014-15 school year and its sports teams compete as the Tornadoes. The school's football field, known as "The Pit," has received national attention from The New York Times, Good Morning America, and the Los Angeles Times as the only dirt American football field in the United States — the region's heat and salty soil make upkeep of a grassy field nearly impossible. Barrow High School in Alaska previously had a dirt field as well, but it was replaced with blue Astroturf in 2007.

== In popular culture ==
A number of Hollywood films have been shot in the surrounding desert (particularly around the Trona Pinnacles), including Star Trek V: The Final Frontier and Planet of the Apes. In the 21st century, the town itself served as the setting for three films, Trona (2004), Just Add Water (2008) and Lost Lake (2012). On April 26, 2016, Toro y Moi traveled to the Trona Pinnacles in California and recorded a live concert film, Toro y Moi - Live from Trona.

== Government ==
In the state legislature, Trona is located in the 19th Senate District, represented by Republican Rosilicie Ochoa Bogh, and in the 34th Assembly District, represented by Republican Tom Lackey

In the United States House of Representatives, Trona is in California's 23rd Congressional District, represented by Republican Jay Obernolte.

In the 2014 general election, 350 Trona Joint Unified residents voted, out of 692 registered, according to the San Bernardino County Registrar of Voters. That 50.5 percent rate beat the 42.2 percent statewide average that election.

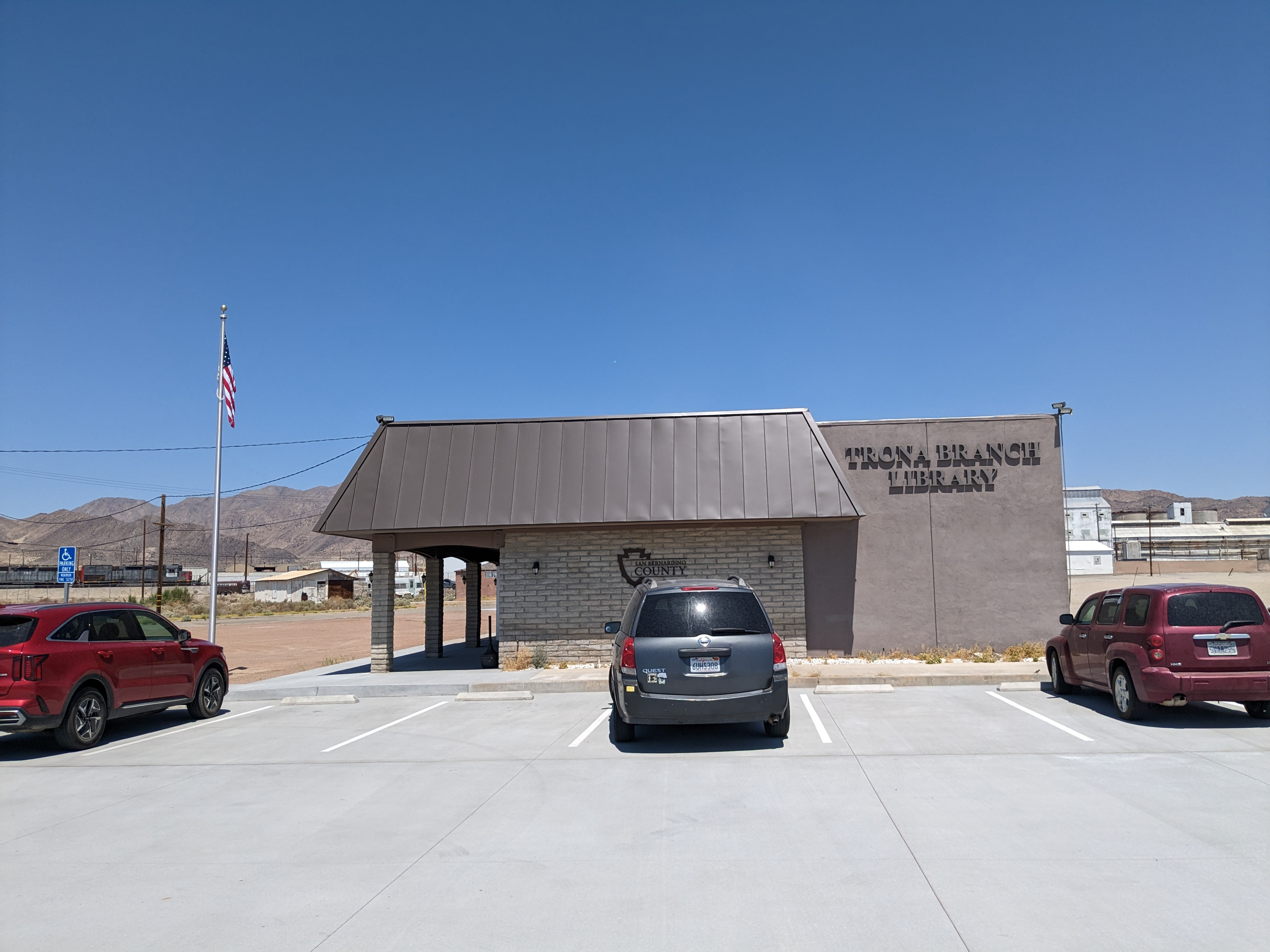
Trona Branch Library

Public works services in Trona are provided by County Service Area 82 Searles Valley. The entity is responsible for the maintenance of Trona's only park/rest area, sewer service, street lighting, animal control services, and cemetery services. Cemetery services are contracted out to the Searles Valley Cemetery Association

== Arts and culture ==
In October, Trona historically hosts Gem-O-Rama, an event hosted by Searles Lake Gem and Mineral Society as a way to teach kids about minerals found in Searles Lake.

In March 2014, Trona celebrated its Centennial Celebration of the town's founding.

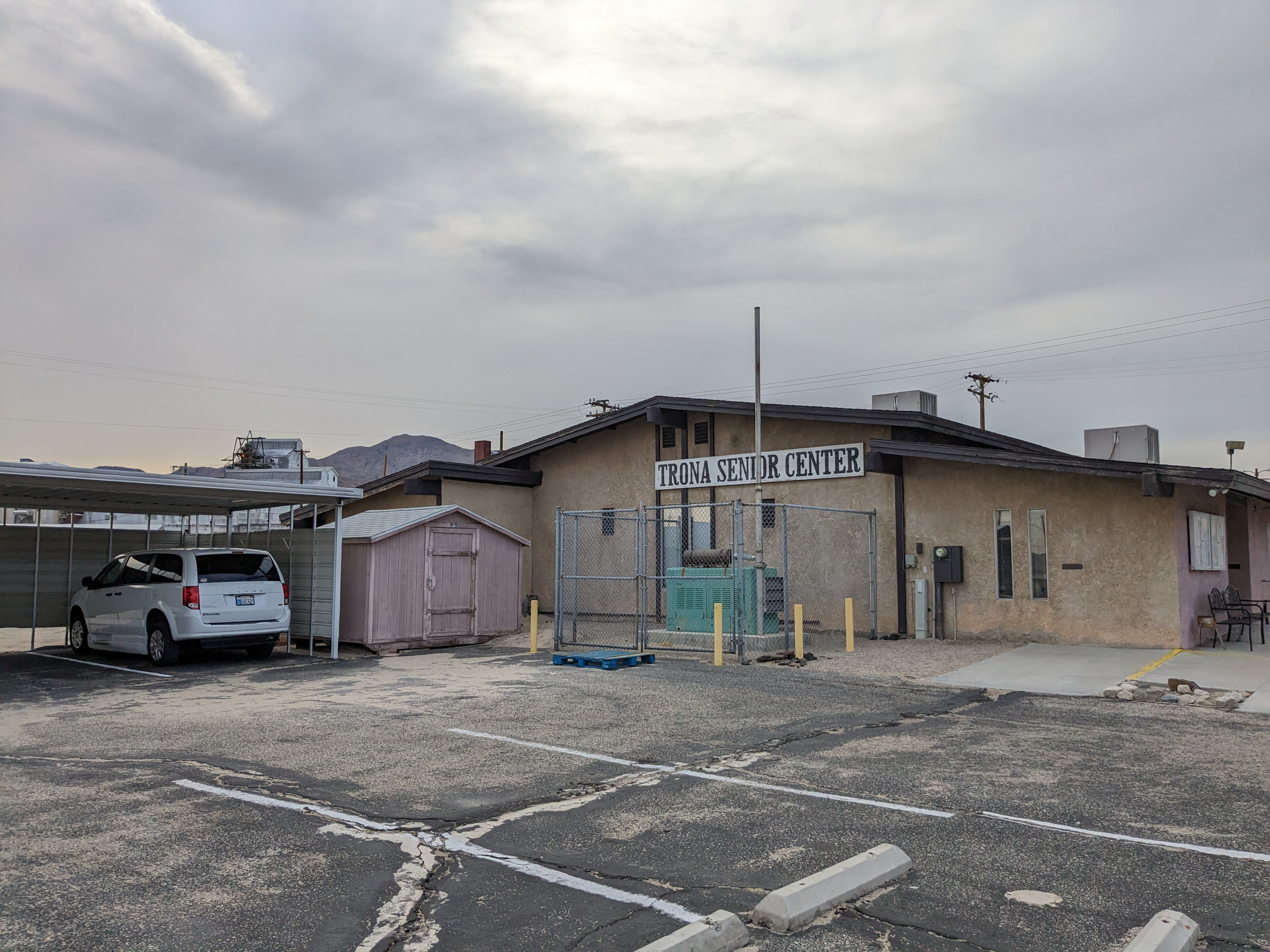
Trona Senior Center

== Transportation ==
Although the community of Trona doesn't have a fixed route bus serving the community, Victor Valley Transit Authority offers a lifeline service, that is contracted out to the Trona Community Senior Center, to offer one day per week shuttle service to Ridgecrest to all residents for their shopping needs. VVTA also provides economic assistance to the Trona Community Senior Center, for senior transportation services

=== Trona Airport ===
The Trona Airport, located in neighboring Inyo County, serves the community as a general aviation airfield.

== Views of Trona ==
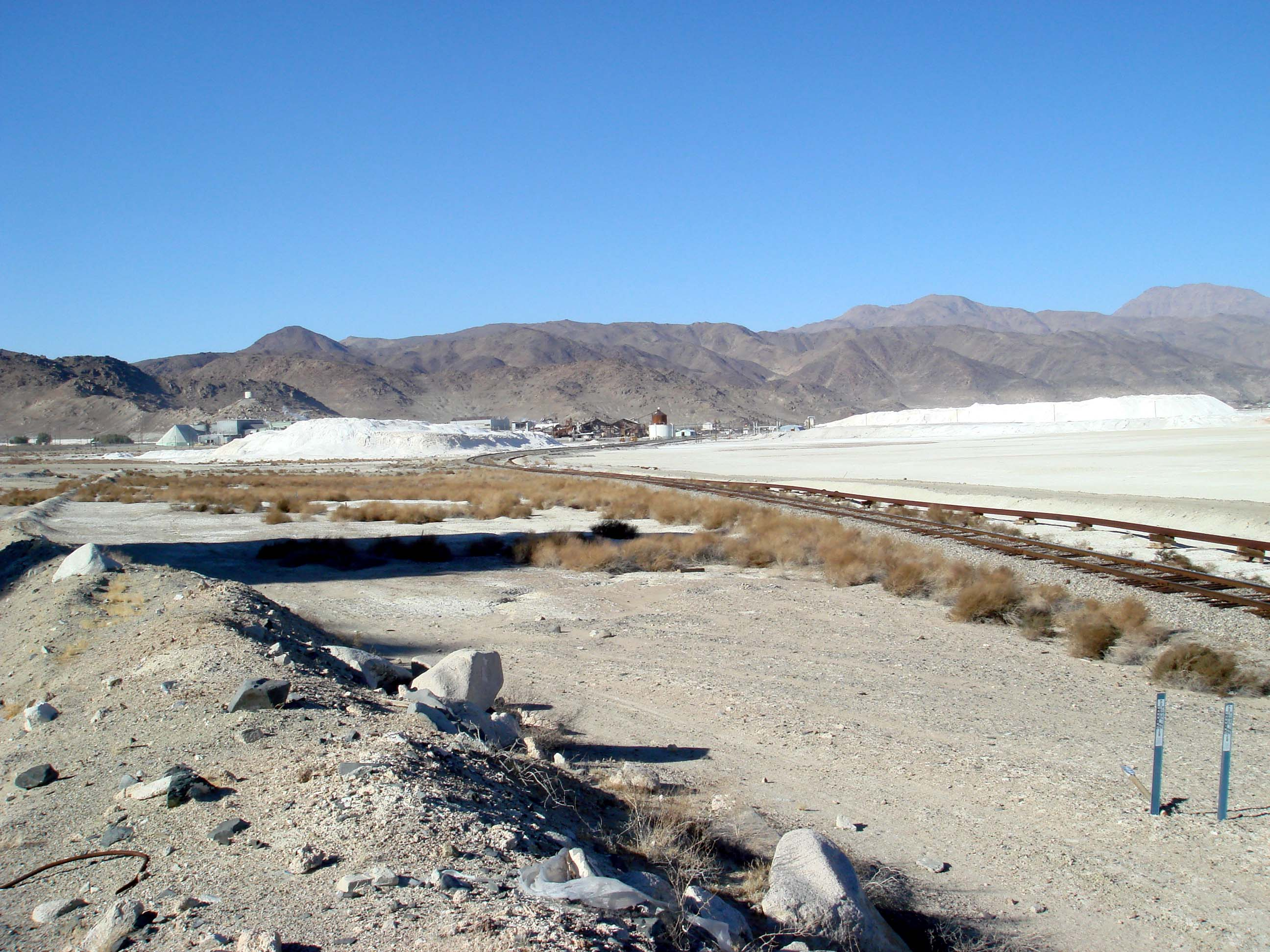
Piles of lime dust sit just south of Trona on the Trona Railway.

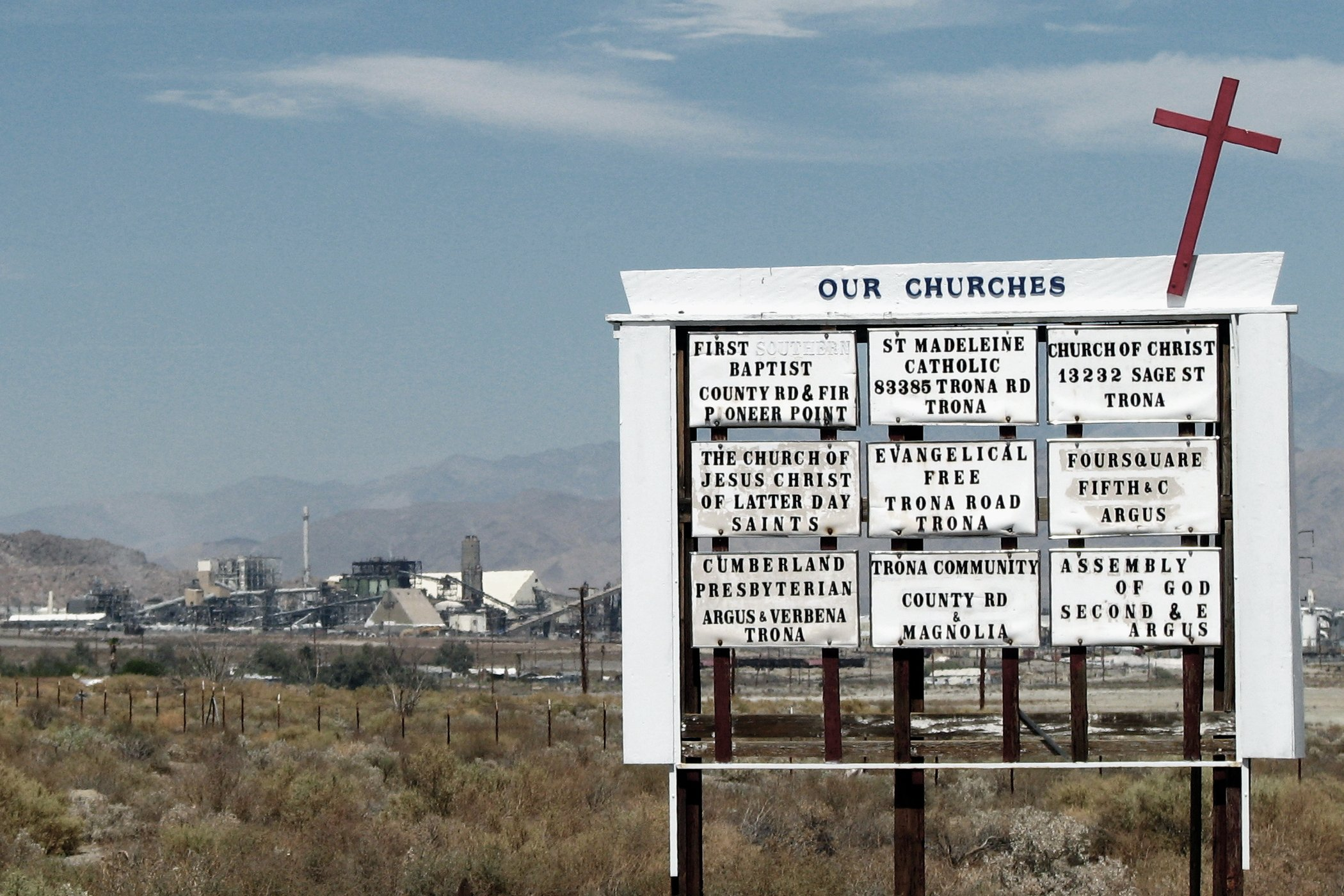
Entrance to town

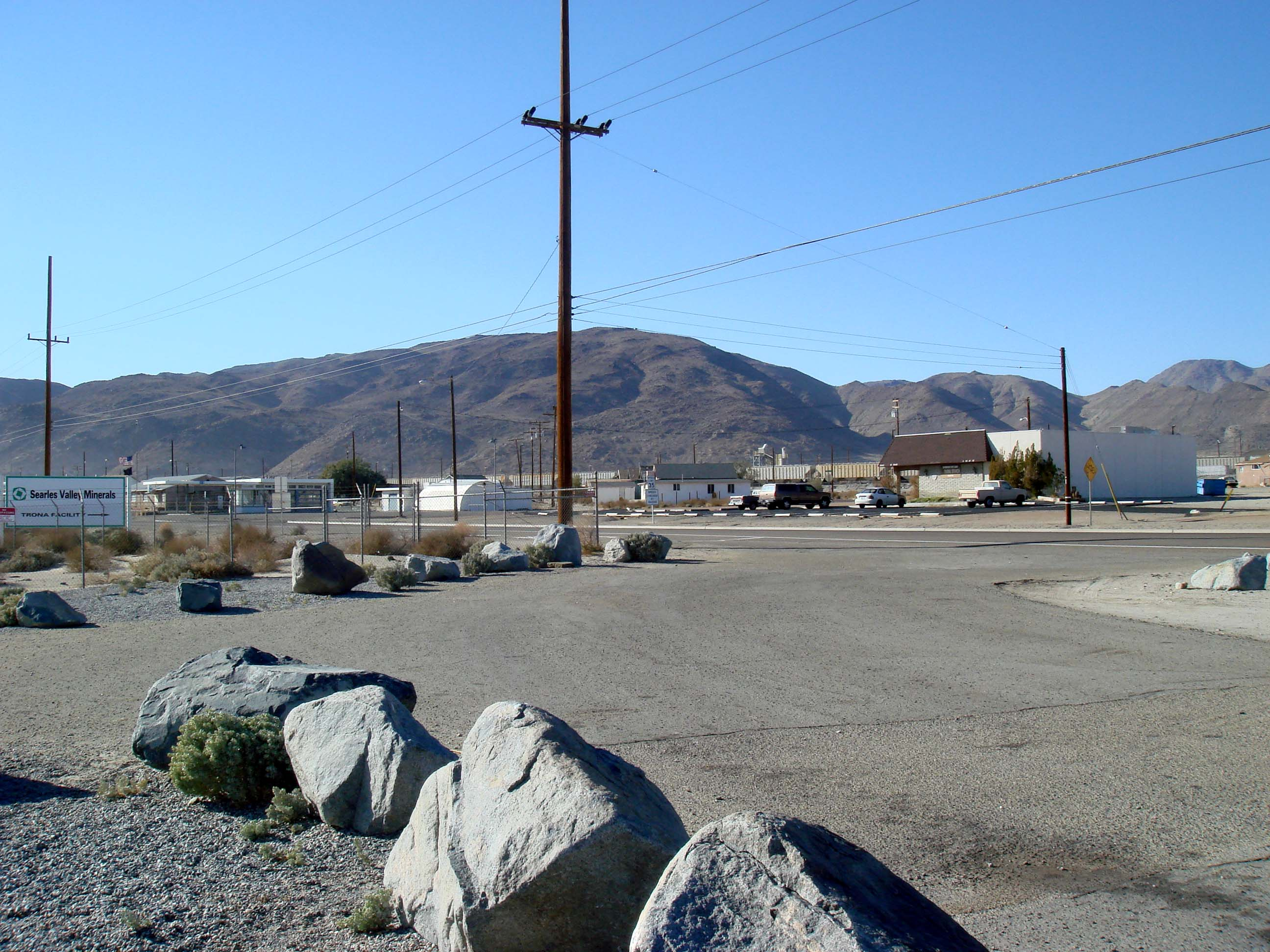
Trona from the tourist rest stop

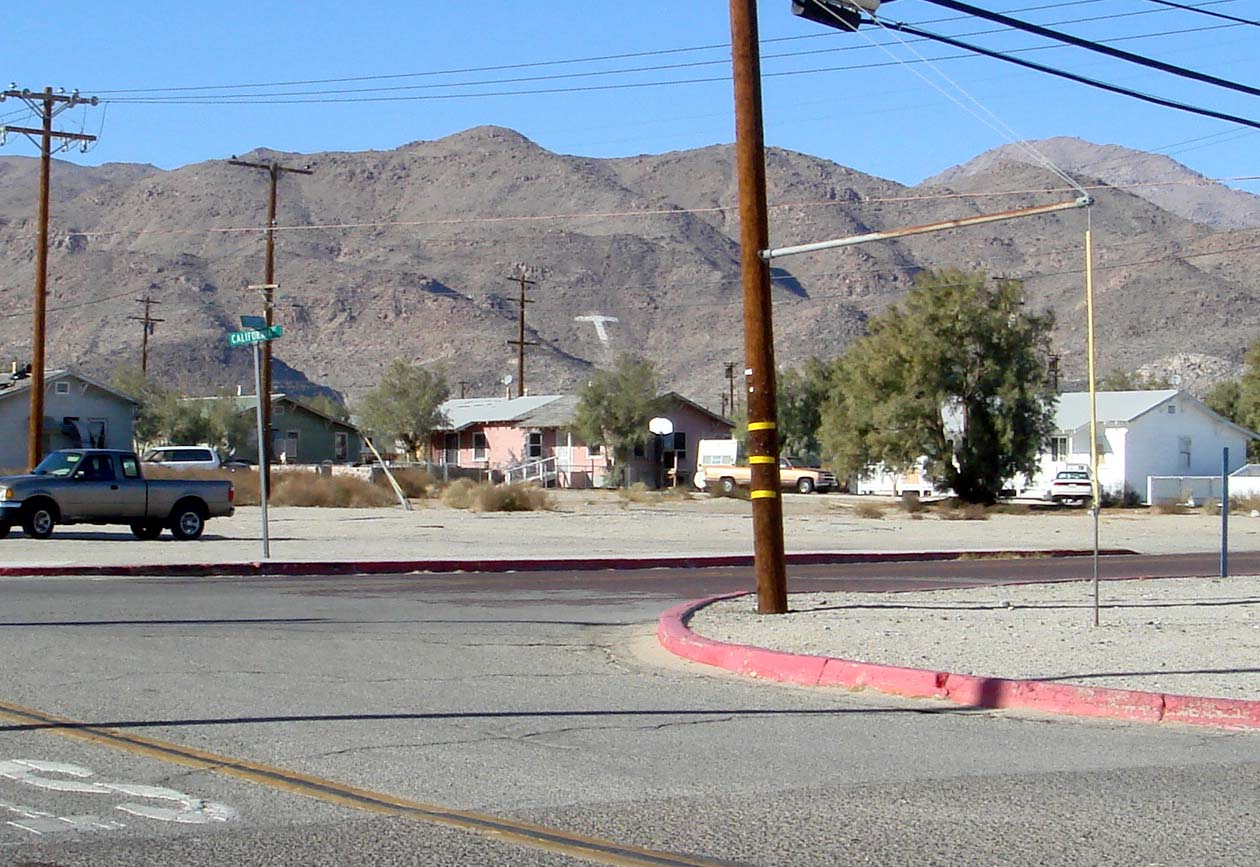
A Mountain Monogram "T" sits on the hills above Trona.

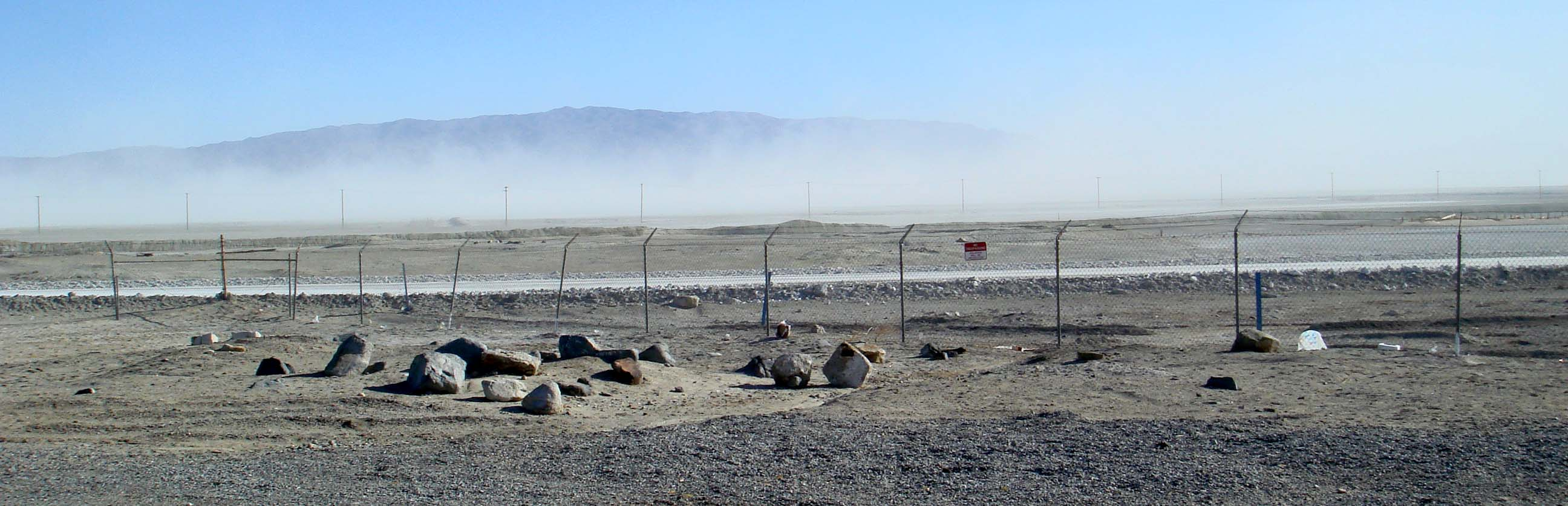
A dust storm forms over the dry Searles Lake bed, viewed from the Trona tourist stop.

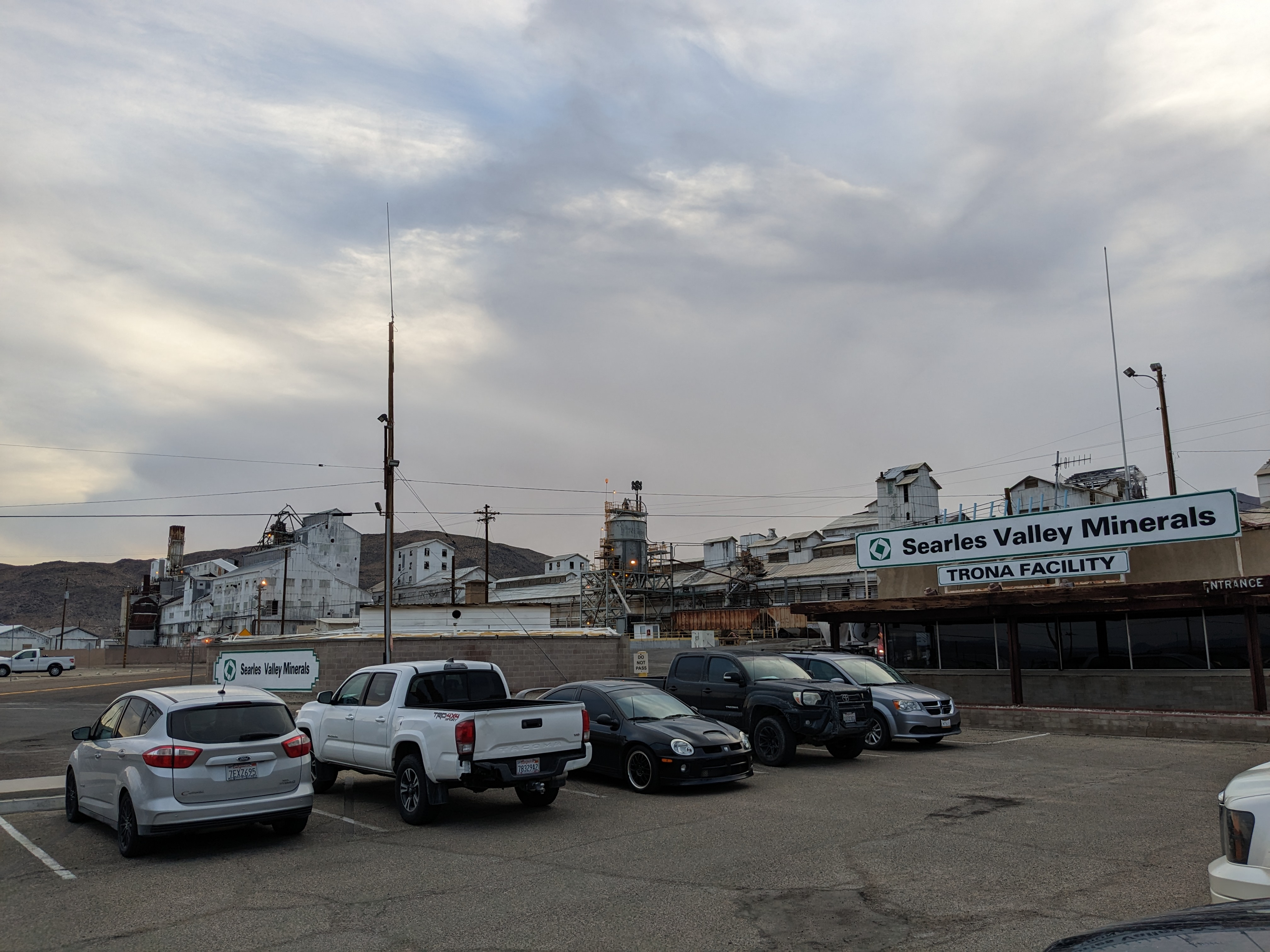
Searles Valley Minerals Facility Sign

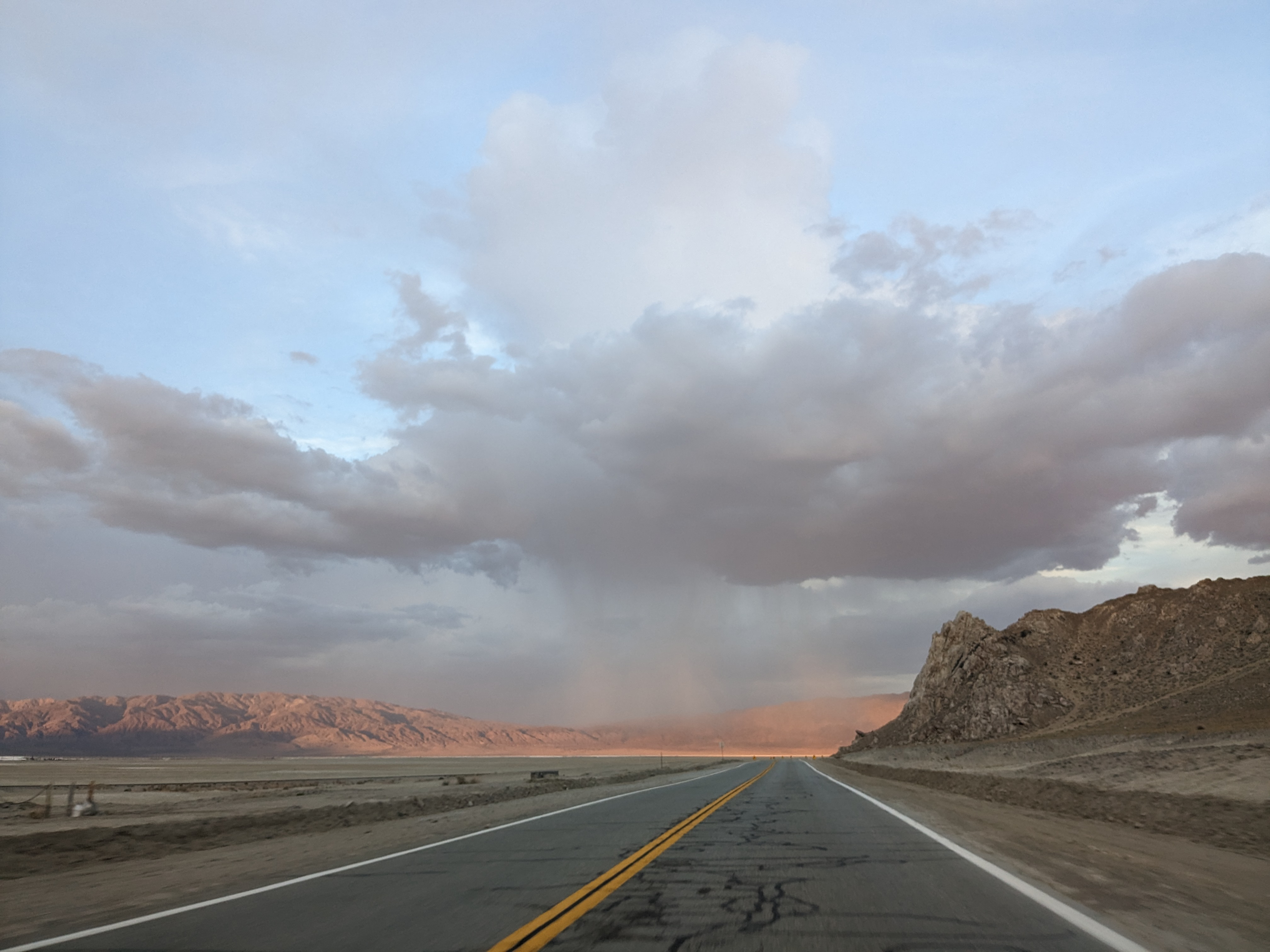
Weather on Trona Road

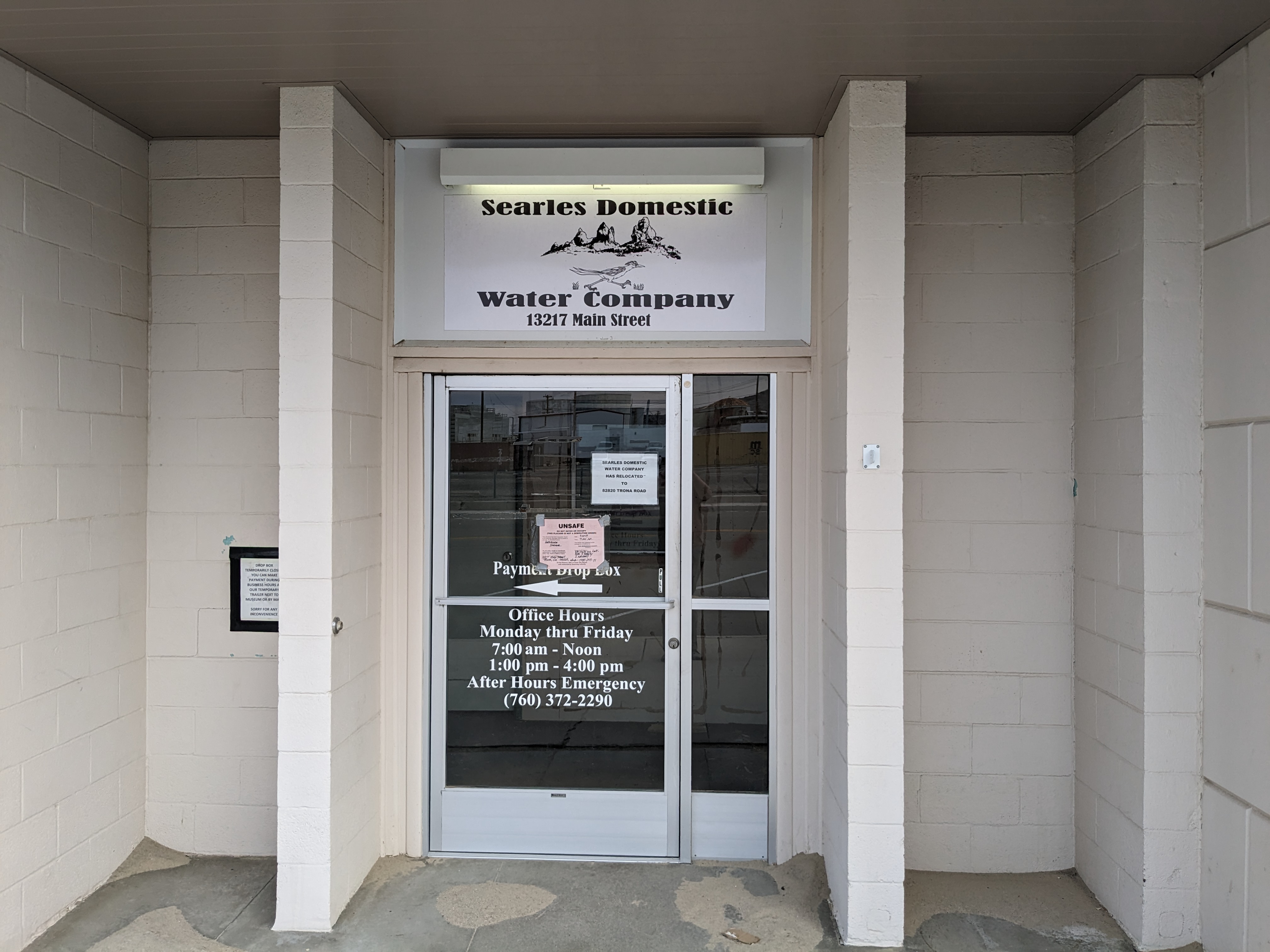
Searles Valley Domestic Water Company

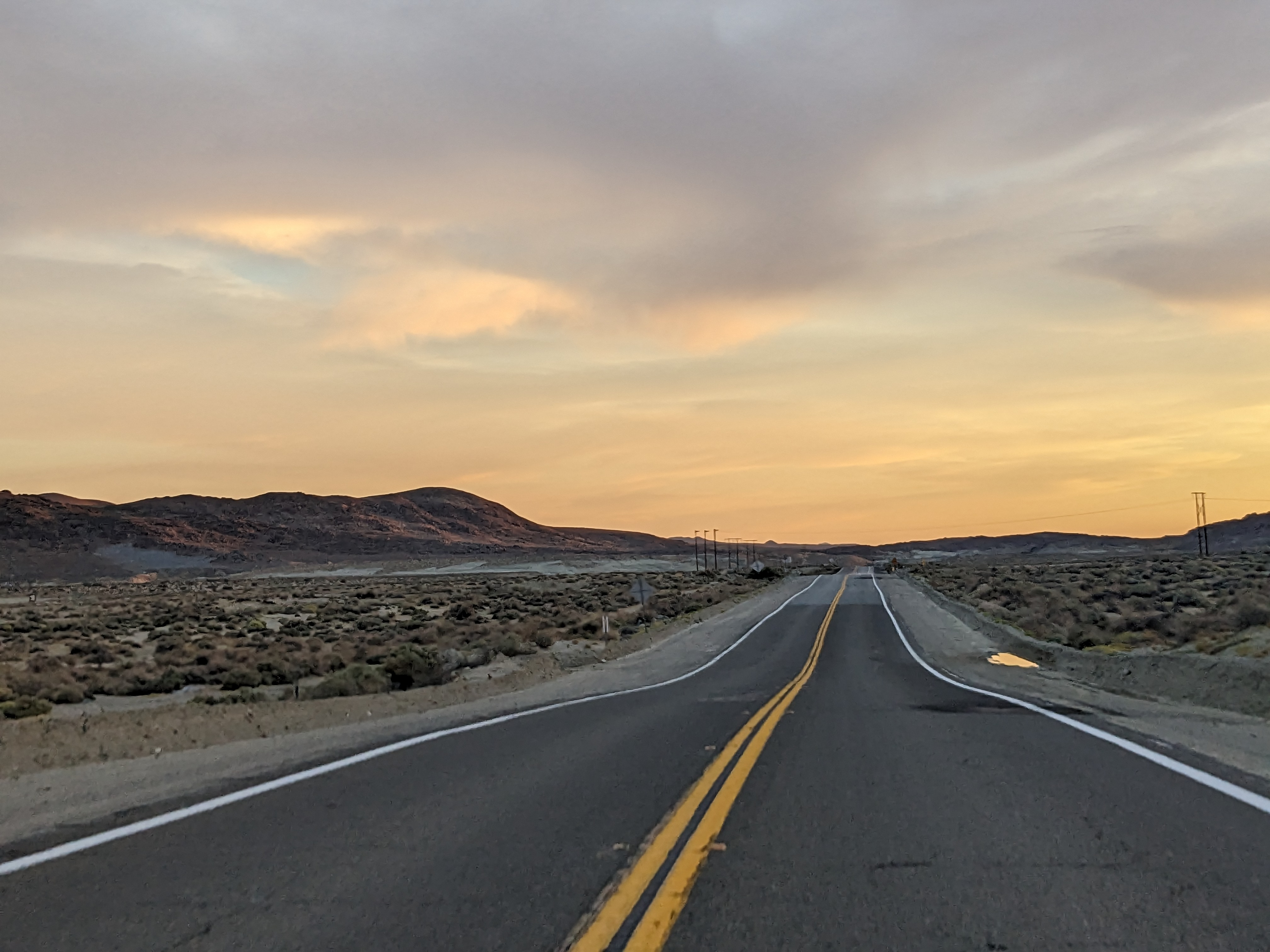
Sunset on Trona Road

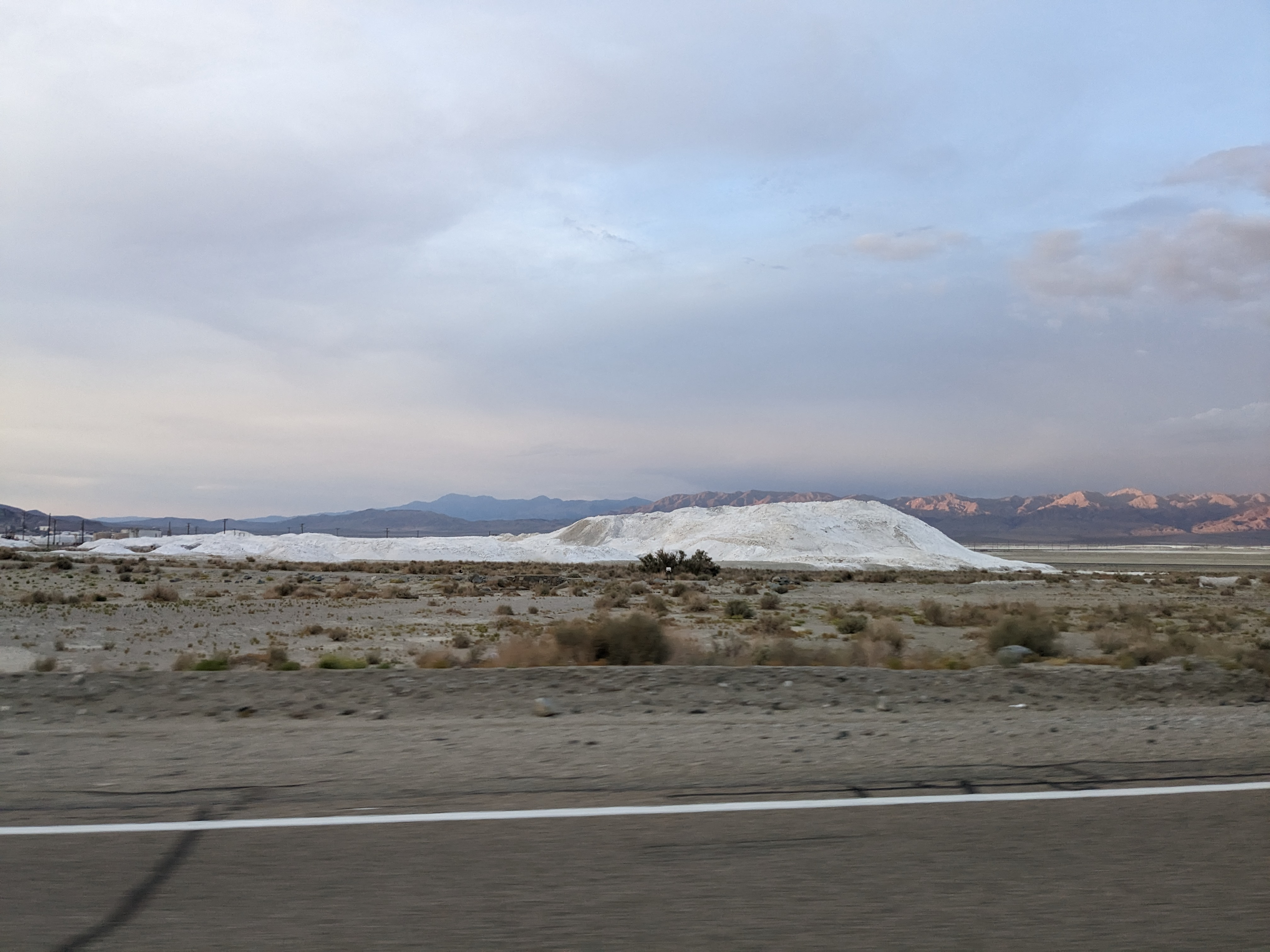
Stockpile in Searles Lake

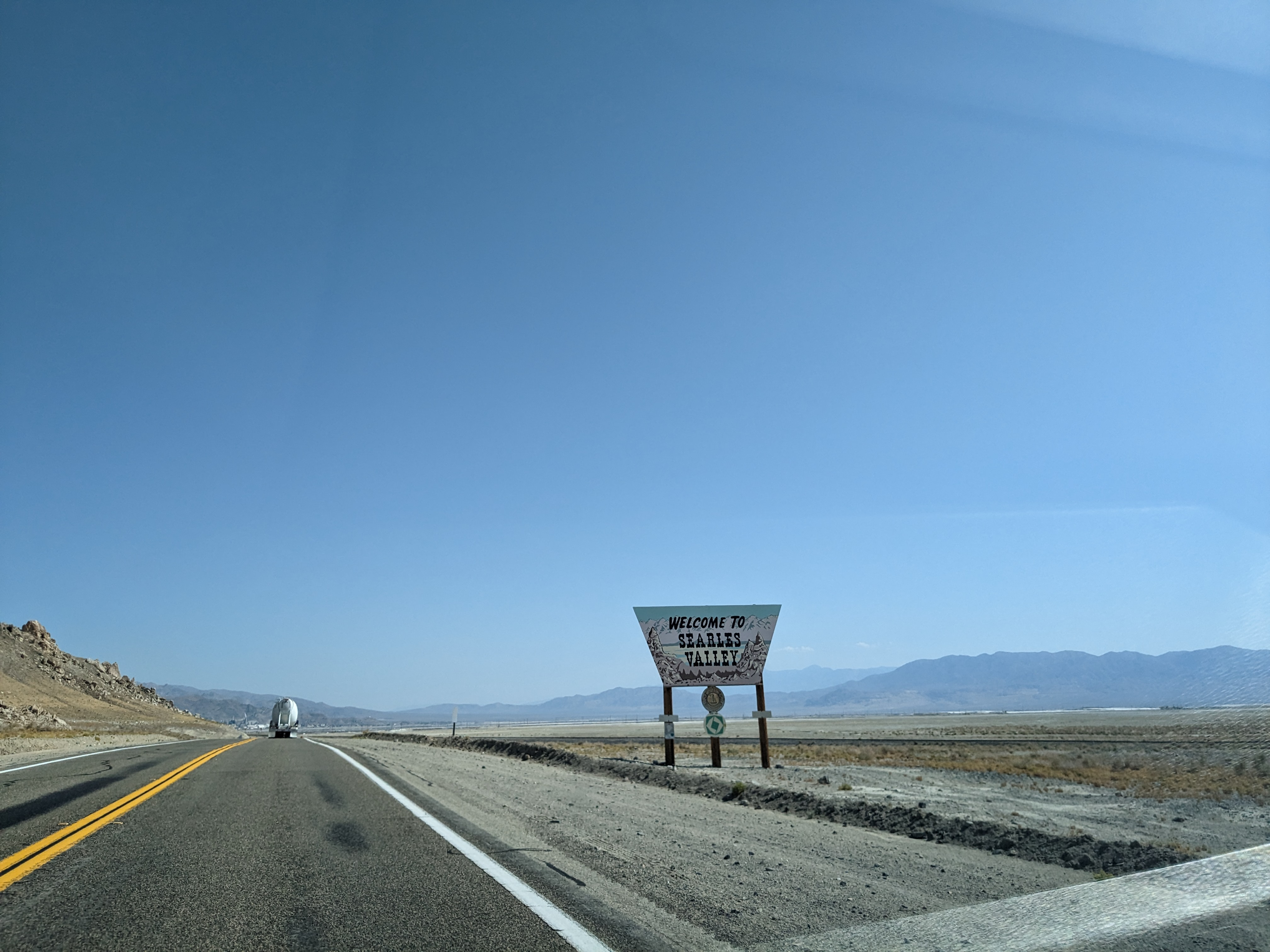
Searles Valley Sign

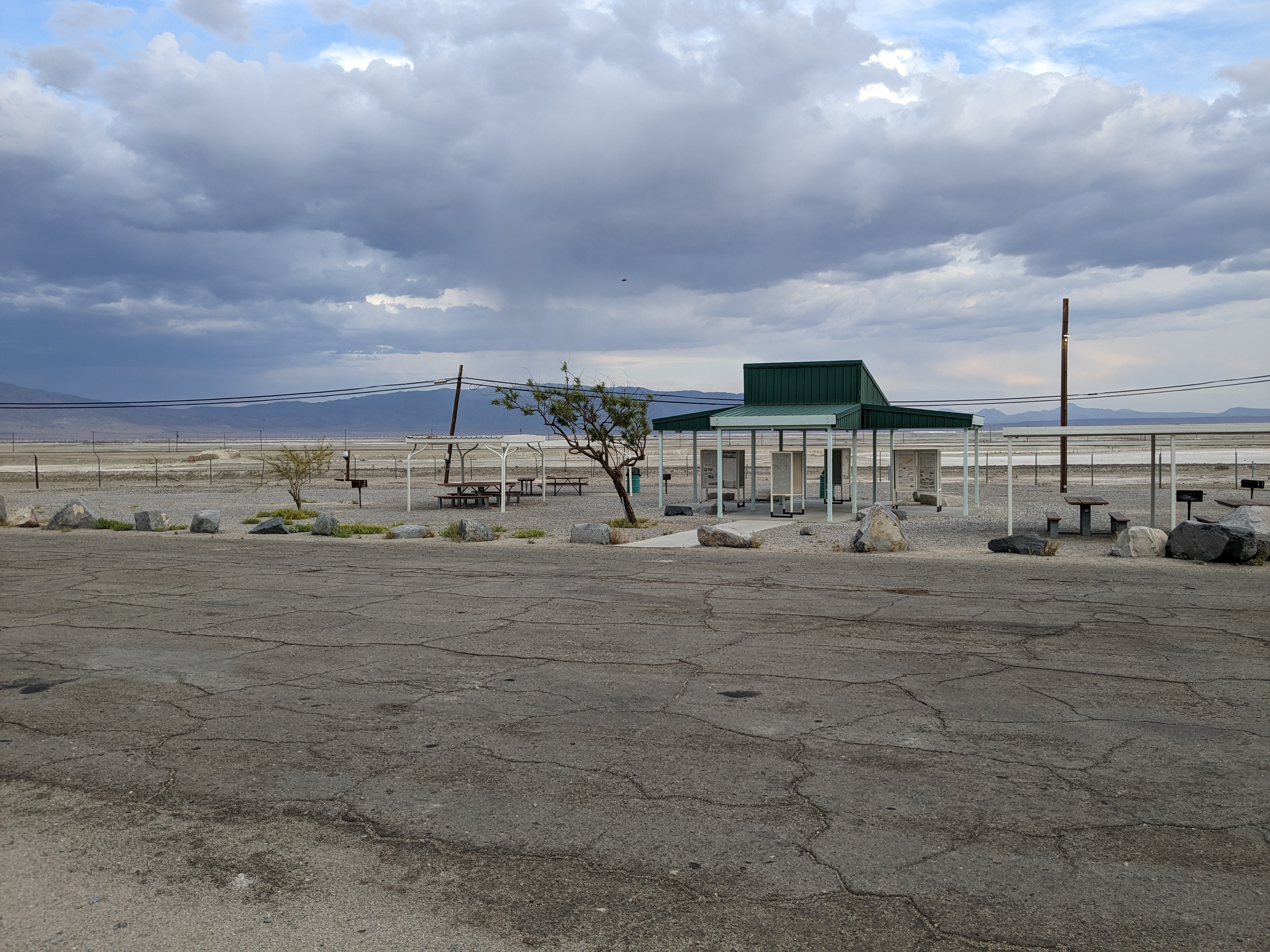
Trona Rest Stop

== See also ==
- Potash wars (California)
- Trona, Inyo County, California
