= 2005 in public domain =

When a work's copyright expires, it enters the public domain. The following is a list of works that entered the public domain in 2005. Since laws vary globally, the copyright status of some works are not uniform.

== Entered the public domain in countries with life + 70 years ==
With the exception of Belarus (Life + 50 years) and Spain (Life + 80 years for creators that died before 1987), a work enters the public domain in Europe 70 years after the creator's death, if it was published during the creator's lifetime. The list is sorted alphabetically and includes a notable work of the creator that entered the public domain on January 1, 2005.

Names	Country	Birth	Death	Occupation	Notable work
Jakob Wassermann	Germany	10 March 1873	1 January 1934	novelist.	Melusine, The Maurizius Case, My Life as German and Jew
Dorothy Edwards	United Kingdom	18 August 1902	5 January 1934	novelist, short story writer.	Rhapsody, Winter Sonata
Andrei Bely	Russia	26 October 1880	8 January 1934	novelist, poet, literary critic.	Petersburg, The Silver Dove
Helen Zimmern	United Kingdom	25 March 1846	11 January 1934	children's writer, biographer, political writer, translator.	Arthur Schopenhauer, his Life and his Philosophy, Tripoli and Young Italy
Hermann Bahr	Austria	19 July 1863	15 January 1934	novelist, playwright, art critic, literary critic.	The Concert, Expressionism
Ferenc Móra	Hungary	19 July 1879	8 February 1934	novelist, journalist, museologist.	Sons of the Slave Man, A Journey in the Underground Hungary, Suns, Moons, Bygone Stars
Emeline Harriet Howe	United States	2 January 1844	28 February 1934	poet.	Poems, A Basket of Fragments, From Height to Height
Thomas Anstey Guthrie	United Kingdom	8 August 1856	10 March 1934	comic novelist, parodist, humorist.	Vice Versa, The Man from Blankley's, The Tinted Venus
Safvet-beg Bašagić	Bosnia	6 May 1870	9 April 1934	biographer, poet, bibliographer, translator.	Bosnians and Herzegovinians in Islamic literature, Illustrious Croats - Bosnians and Herzegovinians in the Ottoman empire
R. C. Packer	Australia	24 July 1879	12 April 1934	journalist, newspaper editor, publisher.	founder of Smith's Weekly and the Daily Guardian
Paul Zarifopol	Romania	30 November 1874	1 May 1934	literary critic, social critic, essayist, literary historian, magazine publisher.	founder of Revista Fundațiilor Regale, writer of A Register of Tender Ideas, Artists and Ideas in Romanian Literature
John Gray	United Kingdom	2 March 1866	14 June 1934	poet, novelist, translator.	Park: A Fantastic Story, Silverpoints, Spiritual Poems, chiefly done out of several languages
Thorne Smith	United States	27 March 1892	20 June 1934	fantasy writer, comedy writer, mystery writer, poet, screenwriter.	Topper, Topper Takes a Trip, The Night Life of the Gods, Turnabout
Naitō Konan	Japan	27 August 1866	26 June 1934	historian, Sinologist.	Nara
Fritz Gerlich	Germany	15 February 1883	30 June 1934	journalist, historian, political writer, satirist.	The Testament of Henry VI, Communism as the Theory of the Thousand Year Reich, Does Hitler Have Mongolian Blood?
Karl-Günther Heimsoth	Germany	4 December 1899	June 1934	physician, sexologist, homosexual activist, astrologist.	Hetero- and Homophilia, Love Between Friends or Homosexuality, Character Constellation: With Particular Reference to Homosexuality
Willi Schmid	Germany	12 April 1893	30 June 1934	music critic, musician.	music critic for the Münchener Neueste Nachrichten, founder of the music band Munich Viol Quartet
Hayim Nahman Bialik	Ukraine	9 January 1873	4 July 1934	poet, essayist, translator, publisher, folklorist.	In the City of Slaughter, Sefer HaAggadah
Julian Hawthorne	United States	22 June 1846	14 July 1934	novelist, short story writer, poet, essayist, travel writer, biographer, historian.	The Great Bank Robbery, An American Penman, A Tragic Mystery, Section 558, Another's Crime
Karl Joel	Germany	27 March 1864	23 July 1934	philosopher.	Nietzsche und die Romantik, Ursprung der Naturphilosophie aus dem Geiste der Mystik, Geschichte der antiken Philosophie
Frane Bulić	Croatia	4 October 1846	29 July 1934	archaeologist, historian.	Croatian monuments in the Knin area and Dalmatia from the age of Croatian national dynasties, Palace of Emperor Diocletian in Split, The steps of the Croatian national rulers
Mary Hunter Austin	United States	9 September 1868	13 August 1934	nature writer, playwright.	The Land of Little Rain, The Arrow Maker, Taos Pueblo
Rebecca Richardson Joslin	United States	20 March 1846	30 August 1934	essayist, historian.	Chasing Eclipses: The Total Solar Eclipses of 1905, 1914, 1925, 1929, Essays on Early Years of Charles V. in Spain, War of the Comuneros, Rival Claimants to the Spanish Throne, French Influence in Spain, Italian Literature in the Time of Charles III. of Spain
Roger Fry	United Kingdom	14 December 1866	9 September 1934	painter, art critic, essayist, translator.	An essay in Aesthetics, Art History as an Academic Study, The Artist and Psycho-Analysis, Flemish Art
Gheorghe Bogdan-Duică	Romania	2 January 1866	21 September 1934	literary critic, biographer, editor, translator.	The Romanians and the Jews, Pointless Literature (of Course by Lucian Blaga))
Arthur Wing Pinero	United Kingdom	24 May 1855	23 November 1934	playwright, actor.	The Magistrate, The Second Mrs Tanqueray, Trelawny of the "Wells", The Gay Lord Quex
Gustave Lanson	France	5 August 1857	15 December 1934	historian, literary critic, biographer.	Molière and Farce, The New Poetry in France, The Modern Subjects in Secondary Education
Wallace Thurman	United States	16 August 1902	22 December 1934	novelist, screenwriter, playwright, ghostwriter, essayist, satirist, editor, publisher.	The Blacker the Berry: A Novel of Negro Life, Harlem: A Melodrama of Negro Life in Harlem, Infants of the Spring
Cora Linn Daniels	United States	17 March 1852	1934	mystery novelist, poet, newspaper editor, journalist, folklorist, encyclopedia writer.	The Bronze Buddha: A Mystery, As It Is To Be, Encyclopaedia of Superstitions, Folklore, and the Occult Sciences of the World: A Comprehensive Library of Human Belief and Practice in the Mysteries of Life

== Entered the public domain in countries with life + 50 years ==
In most countries of Africa and Asia, as well as Belarus, Bolivia, Canada, New Zealand, Egypt and Uruguay; a work enters the public domain 50 years after the creator's death.

Names	Country	Birth	Death	Occupation	Notable work
Alexander Abasheli	Soviet Union	27 August 1884	27 September 1954	Writer	A Woman in the Mirror
Sait Faik Abasıyanık	Turkey	18 November 1906	11 May 1954	Writer	Semaver
Ahmed Agdamski	Soviet Union	5 January 1884	1 April 1954	Singer	If Not That One, Then This One
Franco Alfano	Italy	8 March 1875	27 October 1954	Composer	List of operas by Franco Alfano
Juan Álvarez	Argentina	3 September 1878	8 April 1954	Historian	Essay on the history of Santa Fe
Maximiano Alves	Portugal	22 August 1888	22 January 1954	Sculptor	Selected works
Ahmad Amin	Egypt	1 October 1886	30 May 1954	Writer	Dawn of Islam
Martin Andersen Nexø	Denmark	26 June 1869	1 June 1954	Writer	Pelle the Conqueror
Oswald de Andrade	Brazil	11 January 1890	22 October 1954	Writer	Manifesto Antropófago
Bruno Angoletta	Italy	7 September 1889	7 January 1954	Cartoonist	Marmittone
Peter van Anrooy	Netherlands	13 October 1879	31 December 1954	Composer	Piet Hein Rhapsodie voor symfonieorkest
John L. Balderston	United States	22 October 1889	8 March 1954	Playwright	Berkeley Square, Dracula
Lionel Barrymore	United States	28 April 1878	15 November 1954	Actor, film director	Lionel Barrymore on stage, screen and radio
Constantin Beldie	Romania	8 September 1887	11 June 1954	Journalist, writer	Gloss on the Bookish Spirit
Jacinto Benavente	Spain	12 August 1866	14 July 1954	Writer	The Unloved Woman
Frans G. Bengtsson	Sweden	4 October 1894	19 December 1954	Writer	The Long Ships
Maxwell Bodenheim	United States	26 May 1892	6 February 1954	novelist, poet, memoirist, journalist.	My Life and Loves in Greenwich Village
Hakon Børresen	Denmark	2 June 1876	6 October 1954	Composer	Den Kongelige Gæst
Vitaliano Brancati	Italy	24 July 1907	25 September 1954	Writer	Don Giovanni in Sicilia
Roman Bratkowski	Ukraine/Poland	2 September 1869	5 September 1954	Painter	Pejzaż zimowy
Walter Braunfels	Germany	19 December 1882	19 March 1954	Composer	Die Vögel
Pauline Brunius	Sweden	2 October 1881	30 March 1954	Actress, film director	False Greta
Claude Cahun	France	25 October 1894	8 December 1954	Photographer, writer	Disavowals or Cancelled Confessions
Robert Capa	Hungary	22 October 1913	25 May 1954	Photographer	The Falling Soldier
Enrico Cavacchioli	Italy	15 March 1885	4 January 1954	Writer	List of works by Enrico Cavacchioli
Papa Celestin	United States	1 January 1884	15 December 1954	Musician	Papa Celestin's Golden Wedding
E. K. Chambers	United Kingdom	16 March 1866	21 January 1954	Literary scholar	The Elizabethan Stage
Dmytro Chornovil	Soviet Union	7 November 1902	8 March 1954	Architect	State Academic Music Drama Theatre in Vinnytsia
Eugen Coca	Soviet Union	15 April 1893	9 January 1954	Composer	Maria's Fortune
Colette	France	28 January 1873	3 August 1954	Writer	Gigi
Julian Coolidge	United States	28 September 1873	5 March 1954	Mathematician	A Treatise on the Circle and the Sphere
Duff Cooper	United Kingdom	22 February 1890	1 January 1954	Politician, historian	Old Men Forget
Maria Adelaide Coelho da Cunha	Portugal	13 October 1869	23 November 1954	Socialite	Doida, Não!
Stig Dagerman	Sweden	5 October 1923	4 November 1954	Writer, journalist	A Burnt Child
Jibanananda Das	India	17 February 1899	22 October 1954	Poet	Banalata Sen
Ludovic Dauș	Romania	1 October 1873	17 November 1954	Writer, translator	Unto Death
Russell Davenport	United States	1899	19 April 1954	Writer	My Country, A Poem of America
Alcide De Gasperi	Italy	3 April 1881	19 August 1954	Politician	Nella lotta per la democrazia
Danylo Demutskyi	Soviet Union	16 July 1893	7 May 1954	Photographer, camera operator	Earth
André Derain	France	10 June 1880	8 September 1954	Painter, sculptor	Mountains at Collioure
Leonard Eugene Dickson	United States	22 January 1874	17 January 1954	Mathematician, writer	History of the Theory of Numbers
Nadiya Dobrovolska-Zavadska	Russian Empire/France	25 September 1878	31 October 1954	Geneticist	Sur la mortification spontanée de la queue chez la souris nouveau-née et sur l'existence d'un caractère (facteur) héréditaire "non-viable"
Antoni Bolesław Dobrowolski	Poland	6 June 1872	27 April 1954	Geophysicist	Historia naturalna lodu
Oles Donchenko	Soviet Union	19 August 1902	12 April 1954	Writer	Star Fortress
Alfred Martin Duggan-Cronin	Ireland/South Africa	17 May 1874	25 August 1954	Photographer	
Carl Eldh	Sweden	10 May 1873	26 January 1954	Sculptor	The Branting Monument
Enrico Fermi	Italy/USA	29 September 1901	28 November 1954	Physicist	Publications
Arthur Fickenscher	United States	9 March 1885	15 April 1954	Composer and academic	Willowwood
Bud Fisher	United States	3 April 1885	7 September 1954	Cartoonist	Mutt and Jeff
Constantin Font	France	11 January 1890	25 January 1954	Painter	
Miles Franklin	Australia	14 October 1879	19 September 1954	Writer	My Brilliant Career
Wilhelm Furtwängler	Germany	25 January 1886	30 November 1954	Conductor, composer	Symphony No. 2
Jacques Gachot	Germany/France	11 January 1885	15 December 1954	Painter	Paintings by Jacques Gachot
Nina Genke-Meller	Soviet Union	19 March 1893	25 August 1954	Painter	Suprematist Composition
E. Ray Goetz	United States	12 June 1886	12 June 1954	Composer, lyricist	"For Me and My Gal"
Lil Green	United States	22 December 1901	14 April 1954	Singer, songwriter	"Why Don't You Do Right?", "Romance in the Dark"
W. J. Gruffydd	United Kingdom	14 February 1881	29 September 1954	Writer, scholar	Lyrics
Heinz Guderian	Germany	17 June 1888	14 May 1954	Military officer, writer	Achtung – Panzer!, Panzer Leader
Niqula Haddad	Lebanon	1878	1954	Writer	
Thea von Harbou	Germany	27 December 1888	1 July 1954	Writer, film director	List of works by Thea von Harbou
Jack Harvey	United States	16 September 1881	9 November 1954	Film director	A Dog's Love
Ferenc Herczeg	Hungary	22 September 1863	24 February 1954	Writer	A Gyurkovics-lányok
James Hilton	United Kingdom	9 September 1900	20 December 1954	Writer	Goodbye, Mr. Chips, Lost Horizon
Ludwik Hirszfeld	Poland	5 August 1884	7 March 1954	Microbiologist	Über Vererbung gruppenspezifischer Strukturen des Blutes
Earnest Hooton	United States	20 November 1887	3 May 1954	Anthropologist, cartoonist	Up From The Ape
Ostap Hrytsai	Ukraine/Germany	2 November 1881	7 May 1954	Writer, translator	The Escape of Oleksa Perkhun
Raymond Hubbell	United States	1 June 1879	13 December 1954	Composer, lyricist	"Poor Butterfly"
Ivan Ilyin	Russian Empire/Switzerland	9 April 1883	21 December 1954	Philosopher	Resistance to Evil By Force
Charles Ives	United States	20 October 1874	19 May 1954	Composer	List of compositions by Charles Ives
Ayaz İshaki	Russian Empire/Turkey	22 February 1878	22 July 1954	Writer	Mullah's Wife
Norbert Jacques	Germany	6 June 1880	15 May 1954	Writer	Dr. Mabuse
Hans Janowitz	Germany	2 December 1890	25 May 1954	Screenwriter	The Cabinet of Dr. Caligari
Arthur Johnston	United States	10 January 1898	1 May 1954	Composer	"Cocktails for Two", "Pennies from Heaven"
Frida Kahlo	Mexico	6 July 1907	13 July 1954	Painter	List of paintings by Frida Kahlo
Mikhas Klimkovich	Belarus	20 November 1899	5 November 1954	Poet	"My Belarusy"
Vincas Krėvė-Mickevičius	Lithuania	19 October 1882	17 July 1954	Writer, politician	Skirgaila
Kalki Krishnamurthy	India	9 September 1899	5 December 1954	Writer	Ponniyin Selvan
Zygmunt Kurczyński	Poland	2 April 1886	11 March 1954	Sculptor	Grave of Tadeusz Rutowski
Jörg Lanz von Liebenfels	Austria	17 September 1874	20 April 1954	Political theorist	Ostara
Henri Laurens	France	18 February 1885	5 May 1954	Sculptor	L'Amphion
Alphonse Laverrière	Switzerland	16 May 1872	11 March 1954	Architect	Bois-de-Vaux Cemetery
Édouard Le Roy	France	18 June 1870	10 November 1954	Philosopher, mathematician	Les Origines humaines et l'évolution de l'intelligence
Alain LeRoy Locke	United States	13 September 1885	9 June 1954	Writer	The New Negro
Pyotr Leshchenko	Russian Empire/Romania	14 June 1898	16 July 1954	Singer	Heart
Achille Longo	Italy	28 March 1900	28 May 1954	Composer	Compositions
Gino Loria	Italy	19 May 1862	30 January 1954	Mathematician	Books
Auguste Lumière	France	19 October 1862	10 April 1954	Film director	Workers Leaving the Lumière Factory
Wincenty Lutosławski	Poland	6 June 1863	28 December 1954	Philosopher	The Polish Nation
Jan Maklakiewicz	Poland	24 November 1899	8 February 1954	Composer	Cagliostro in Warsaw
Ivan Malozyomov	Soviet Union	8 October 1899	19 November 1954	Architect	Interiors of Derzhprom
William March	United States	18 September 1893	15 May 1954	Writer	Company K
Santiago Martínez Delgado	Colombia	1906	1954	Painter, sculptor, art historian	Mural at the Colombian Capitol
Henri Matisse	France	31 December 1869	3 November 1954	Painter, sculptor	List of works by Henri Matisse
Joe May	United States	7 November 1880	29 April 1954	Film director	Stuart Webbs
George McManus	United States	23 January 1884	22 October 1954	Cartoonist	Bringing Up Father
Emilis Melngailis	Latvia/Soviet Union	15 February 1874	10 December 1954	Composer	Maija (Turaidas roze)
Mihri Müşfik Hanım	Turkey	26 February 1886	1954	Painter	
Zofia Nałkowska	Poland	10 November 1884	17 December 1954	Writer	Medallions
Herms Niel	Germany	17 April 1888	16 July 1954	Composer	"Erika"
Aleksandr Orlov	Soviet Union	6 April 1880	28 January 1954	Astronomer	Selected works in 3 volumes
Yukio Ozaki	Japan	24 December 1858	6 October 1954	Politician	The Autobiography of Ozaki Yukio: The Struggle for Constitutional Government in Japan
Auguste Perret	France	12 February 1874	25 February 1954	Architect	Théâtre des Champs-Élysées
Washington Phillips	United States	11 January 1880	20 September 1954	Singer	List of songs recorded by Washington Phillips
Dimitrie Pompeiu	Romania	4 October 1873	8 October 1954	Mathematician	Sur la continuité des fonctions de variables complexes
Fred Raymond	Austria	20 April 1900	10 January 1954	Composer	"I Lost My Heart in Heidelberg", Maske in Blau
Yuri Repin	Russian Empire/Finland	10 April 1877	9 August 1954	Painter	Tyurenchen. Eternal life in a glorious death
Grantland Rice	United States	1 November 1880	13 July 1954	Sportswriter	Songs of the Stalwart
Fred Rose	United States	24 August 1898	1 December 1954	Songwriter	"Be Honest with Me"
Luang Saranupraphan	Thailand	24 August 1896	14 June 1954	Writer	"Thai National Anthem"
Leon Schiller	Poland	14 March 1887	25 March 1954	Screenwriter	Pastorale (play)
Dmytro Sheludko	Ukraine/Bulgaria	21 September 1892	5 August 1954	Diplomat, literary scientist	Zur Geschichte des Natureinganges bei den Trobadors
C. Fox Smith	United Kingdom	1 February 1882	8 April 1954	Writer	All the Way Round: Sea Roads to Africa
Oscar Straus	Austria	6 March 1870	11 January 1954	Composer	Ein Walzertraum
Ionel Teodoreanu	Romania	6 January 1897	3 February 1954	Writer	La Medeleni
Lucien Tesnière	France	13 May 1893	6 December 1954	Linguist	Elements of Structural Syntax
Jan Tokarzewski-Karaszewicz	Ukraine/United Kingdom	24 June 1885	18 November 1954	Diplomat, heraldist	Diariy Getmana Pylypa Orlika
Alan Turing	United Kingdom	23 June 1912	7 June 1954	Mathematician	Turing's proof
William Van Alen	United States	10 August 1883	24 May 1954	Architect	Chrysler Building
Getúlio Vargas	Brazil	19 April 1882	24 August 1954	Politician	Carta Testamento
Dziga Vertov	Soviet Union	2 January 1896	12 February 1954	Film director	Man with a Movie Camera
Adrien Voisard-Margerie	France	28 April 1867	20 July 1954	Painter	Taureaux à l'abreuvoir
Mykhailo Vozniak	Soviet Union	3 October 1881	20 November 1954	Literary scholar	History of Ukrainian literature
Hermann Wolfgang von Waltershausen	Germany	12 October 1882	14 June 1954	Composer	Oberst Chabert
Clara Westhoff	Germany	21 September 1878	9 March 1954	Sculptor	Bust of Paula Modersohn-Becker
Eduard Wiiralt	Estonia	20 March 1898	8 January 1954	Graphic artist	Hell
Chester Wilmot	Australia	21 June 1911	10 January 1954	War Correspondent	The Struggle for Europe
Hella Wuolijoki	Finland	22 July 1886	2 February 1954	Writer	Entäs nyt, Niskavuori?
Yuriy Yanovskyi	Soviet Union	27 August 1902	25 February 1954	Writer	The Horseriders
Francis Brett Young	United Kingdom	29 June 1884	28 March 1954	Writer	List of novels of Francis Brett Young
Zhang Shichuan	China	1890	1954	Film director	Laborer's Love

== Entering the public domain in the United States ==
In the United States, the copyright status of works extends for the life of the author or artists, plus 70 years. If the work is owned by a corporation, then the copyright extends 95 years.

Due to the passing of the Copyright Term Extension Act (Sonny Bono Copyright Term Extension Act) in 1998, works never registered or published before January 1, 1978, and whose authors died before 1935 entered the public domain in this jurisdiction on January 1, 2005. Other works would not enter the public domain here until 2019.

== See also ==
- 1904 in literature, 1934 in literature and 1954 in literature for deaths of writers
- Public Domain Day
- Creative Commons
