= Mount Mary Austin =

Mountain in the American state of California

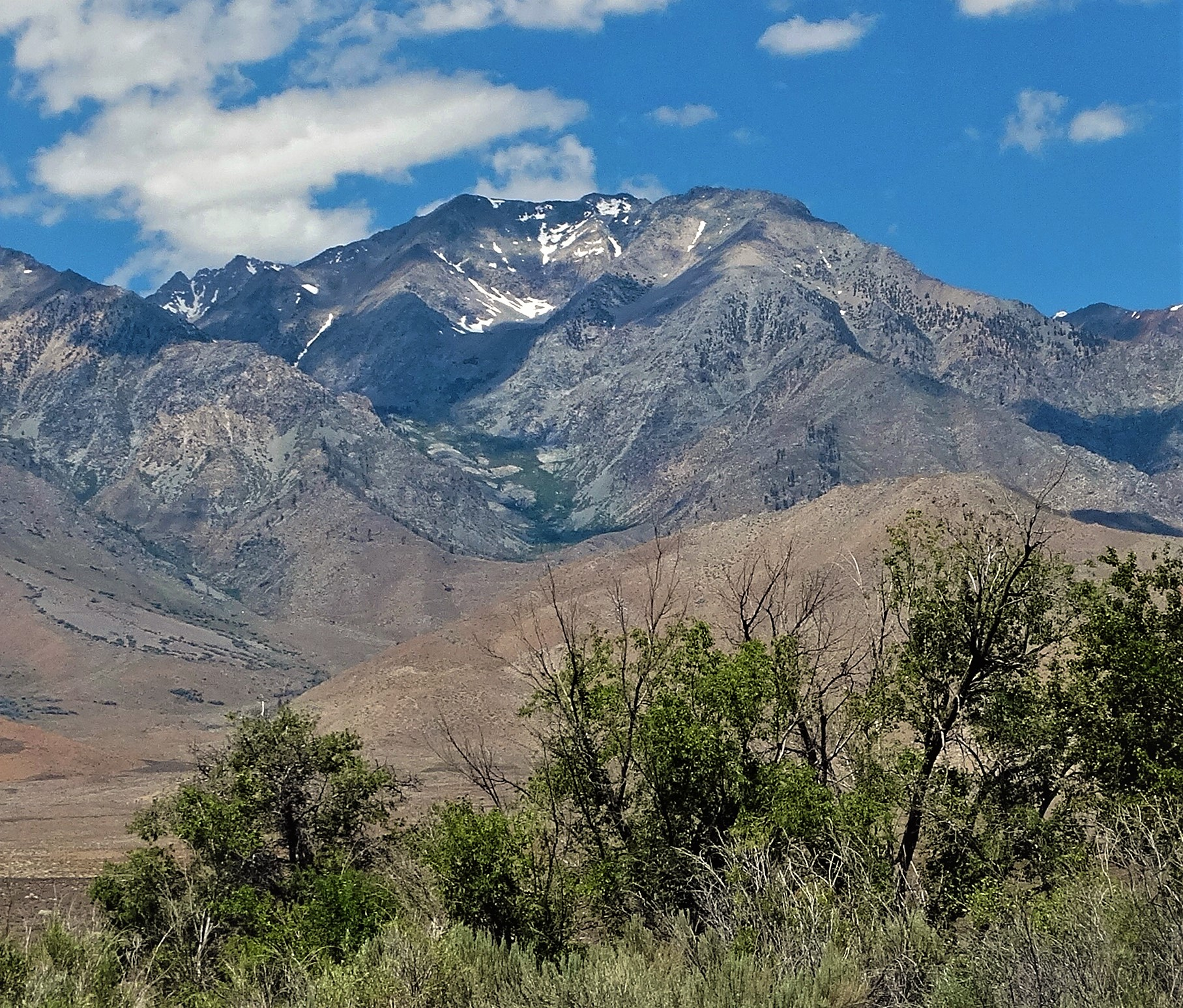
- East aspect, from Owens Valley

Highest point
- Elevation: 13,057 ft (3,980 m) NAVD 88
- Prominence: 518 ft (158 m)
- Parent peak: Black Mountain
- Coordinates: 36°48′57″N 118°21′46″W

Geography
- Location within California
- Location: Inyo County, California, U.S.
- Parent range: Sierra Nevada
- Topo map: USGS Kearsarge Peak

Climbing
- First ascent: May 3, 1965 by Andy Smatko, Tom Ross, Ellen Siegal and Eric Schumacher
- Easiest route: Scramble, class 2

Mount Mary Austin is a mountain east of the Sierra Crest and west of Independence, California. It is named in honor of Mary Hunter Austin, the author of The Land of Little Rain and natural historian who lived in Independence.

The mountain is located in the John Muir Wilderness. Special permits to enter this area have been required in the past since it is habitat for the Sierra Nevada bighorn sheep, an endangered species. The United States Forest Service does not advise the use of pack goats in this area.
