= Charlotte Kellogg =

American author and social activist (1874–1960)

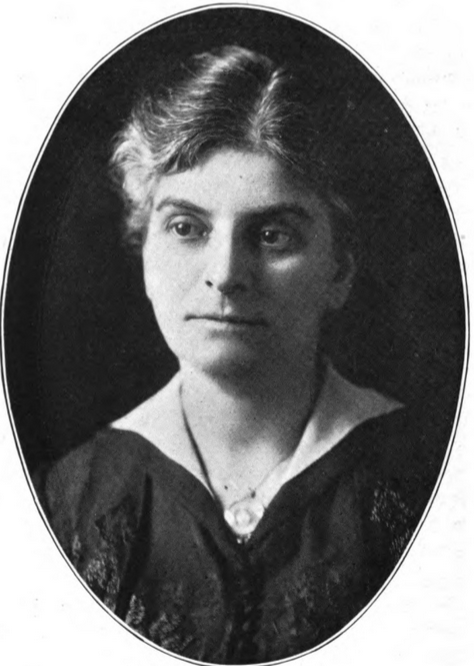
- Charlotte Kellogg, from a 1921 publication
- Born: Charlotte Hoffman; May 21, 1874; Grand Island, Nebraska
- Died: May 8, 1960 (aged 85); Monterey County, California
- Occupations: Author, activist
- Spouse: Vernon Lyman Kellogg

Charlotte Kellogg (née Hoffman; May 21, 1874 – May 8, 1960) was an American author and social activist. She was married to American entomologist Vernon Lyman Kellogg.

== Early life ==
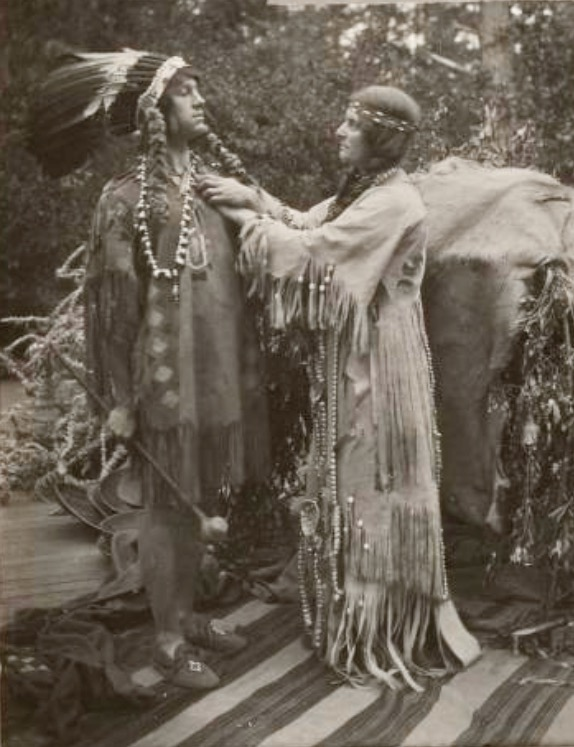
Charlotte Kellogg on right in the play The Arrow Maker (1914).

Charlotte Kellogg was born Charlotte Hoffman on May 21, 1874, in Grand Island, Nebraska. She was the daughter of Charles Meno Hoffman (1842-1900) and Regula Rachel Baumgartner (1852-1933). In 1900 she received a Bachelor of Philosophy degree from the University of California, Berkeley, where she was a member of Gamma Phi Beta.

After five years (1903–1907) as head of the English department at the Anna Head School in Berkeley, California, in 1908 in Florence she married Vernon Lyman Kellogg. Two years later, she gave birth to their only daughter, Jean Kellogg.

In August 1914, she played Chisera, a Medicine Woman of the Paiutes in the play The Arrow Maker, produced by Mary Hunter Austin at the Forest Theater in Carmel-by-the-Sea, California.

In 1916 she traveled to Brussels with Jean and worked for a year with the Commission for Relief in Belgium, at the special request of Herbert Hoover, then Committee chairman of the Commission. Kellogg studied the women of Belgium and in 1917 published Women of Belgium: Turning Tragedy to Triumph, followed by Bobbins of Belgium (1920).

When President Herbert Hoover appointed her husband an assistant to the United States Food Administration, Kellogg joined him in his work as an internationally active war-relief speaker and fund raiser.

== Belgium ==
Some of Kellogg's most notable publications centered around her time spent in Belgium with her husband prior to America's entrance into World War I.

Kellogg was sent by Herbert Hoover and the Commission for Relief in Belgium specifically to document the experience and struggles of the women living in Belgium. According to Herbert Hoover (later President of the United States), who authored an introduction to Kellogg's 1917 publication Women of Belgium: Turning Tragedy to Triumph, Kellogg did "more than record in simple terms passing impressions of varied facts of the great work of these women, for she spent months in loving sympathy with them". Kellogg also spent extensive time researching the Belgian Lace industry, publishing Bobbins of Belgium; a book of Belgian lace, lace-workers, lace-schools and lace-villages, a unique portrait of the women who worked in this industry, which suffered when Belgium faced occupation and the challenges of world war.

During her time abroad, Kellogg developed an intimate relationship with Désiré-Joseph Mercier, a notable Belgian scholar and a famous leader in resisting the German occupation of Belgium in 1914–18. In 1920 Kellogg published a biography of Cardinal Mercier, Mercier, the Fighting Cardinal of Belgium, based on her personal interactions with Mercier and her impression of his personality. This biography contained a foreword by American journalist and diplomat Brand Whitlock who in his foreword to her work wrote that "no one is better qualified than [Kellogg] to speak of [Mercier's] courageous work". Her biography of Mercier includes details of his early life and an extensive history of his activism in Belgium, including many anecdotes and direct quotations from speeches and one-on-one conversations.

== Marie Curie ==
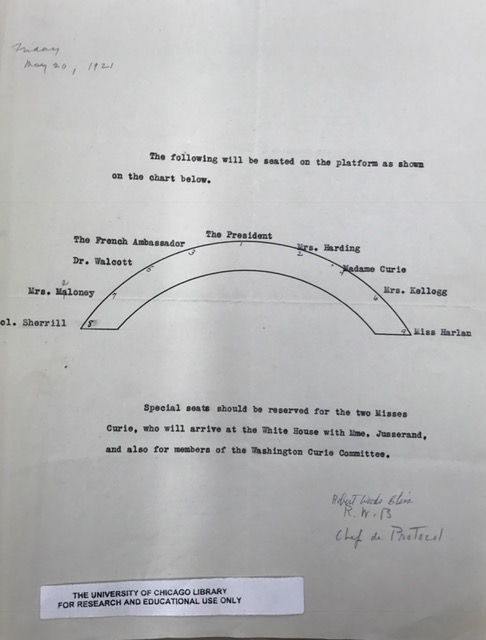
Seating chart: Charlotte Kellogg sits to left of Marie Curie at Radium Gifting Ceremony, 20 May 1921, East Wing of Warren G. Harding's White House

Marie Curie, having refused to patent her discovery of radium, struggled to raise funds to secure the costly element, which in 1921 was priced at US $100,000 per gram. After meeting with American journalist Marie Mattingly Meloney for a rare interview during which she spoke of her research needs, in 1920 Curie agreed to visit the United States to receive a gift of radium, which Meloney promised to procure. Meloney and Kellogg, along with many other American women, facilitated a 1921 grass-roots campaign "to raise money to make a gift to Madame Curie on the occasion of her visit of a gram of radium for exclusive use in experimental work".

Kellogg corresponded with Curie during the months preceding her visit and was appointed by President Warren G. Harding to escort Curie and her two daughters, Irène and Ève on a trans-Atlantic voyage from Paris to New York. Kellogg later recounted that, aboard ship to and from France, Curie worked on her Life of Pierre Curie, which Kellogg assisted in translating.

Kellogg and Curie remained in contact until Curie's death in 1934. Much of their correspondence is preserved in the University of Chicago Library Special Collections.

== Later life ==
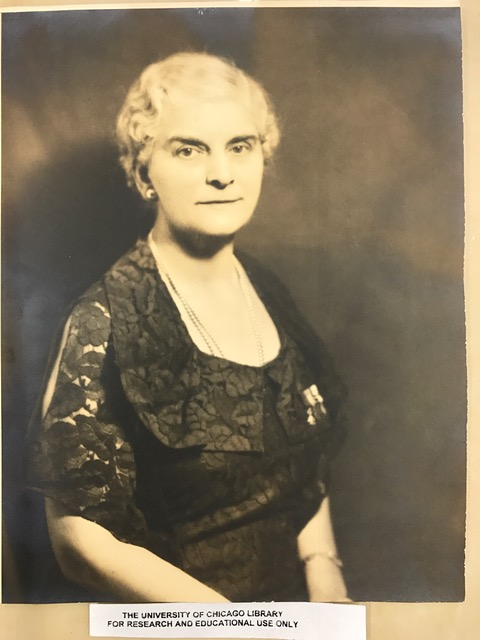
In later life

Following the death of her husband, Vernon Kellogg, on 8 August 1937, Charlotte Kellogg continued to write, living in Monterey County, California, until her death on May 8, 1960, at the age of 85. She was survived by her only daughter, Jean Kellogg Dickie, who married cartoonist James Dickie on July 31, 1960.

== Writings ==
- The Burial of John Muir (1916)
- Charlotte Kellogg, Women of Belgium: Turning Tragedy to Triumph, with an introduction by Herbert C. Hoover, Chairman of The Commission for Relief in Belgium, third edition, New York and London, Funk & Wagnalls Company, 1917, 210 pp.
- Poland's Women (1920)
- Bobbins of Belgium (1920)
- Mercier, the Fighting Cardinal of Belgium (1920)
- Charlotte Kellogg, Jadwiga, Queen of Poland, with a preface by Ignace Jan Paderewski and an introduction by Frank A. Simonds, Washington, Anderson House, 1936, 251 pp.
- Paderewski (1956)
- Charlotte Kellogg, Prelude, The Ward Ritchie Press, 1960, 51 pp. Copyright 1960 by Jean Kellogg Dickie. Preface by Jean Kellogg, December, 1960, Carmel, California. Foreword by Eric Barker. "300 copies of Prelude by Charlotte Kellogg have been printed in December 1960. This is copy number 184"
