= Mountains at Collioure =

1905 painting by André Derain

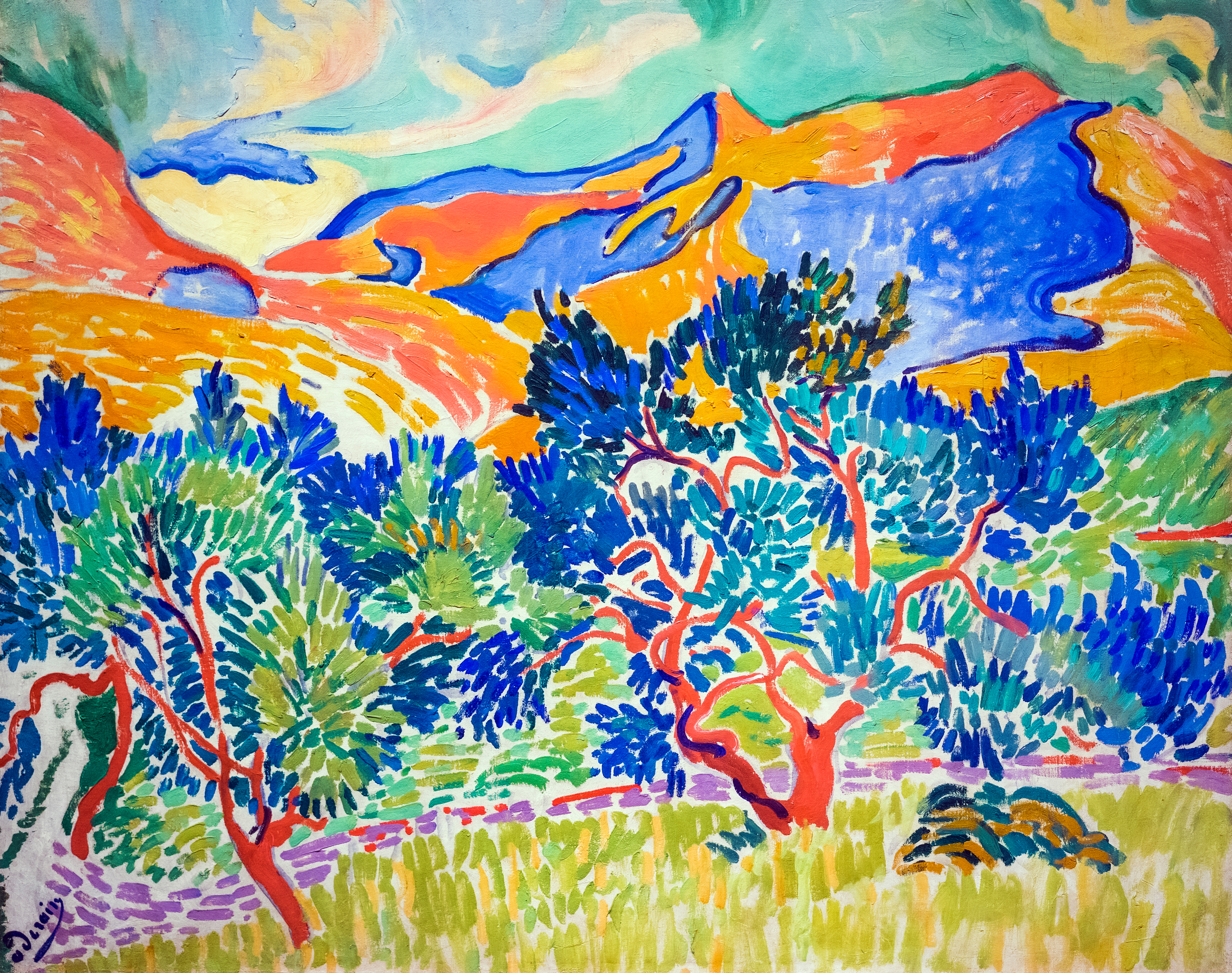
- Artist: André Derain
- Year: 1905
- Medium: oil on canvas
- Dimensions: 81.3 cm × 100.3 cm (32.0 in × 39.5 in)
- Location: National Gallery of Art; Washington, D.C.

Mountains at Collioure is a 1905 painting by French painter André Derain. It was made while he was working with Henri Matisse at the fishing port of Collioure, in France. It has been in the National Gallery of Art in Washington, D.C. since John Hay Whitney, the previous owner, died in 1982. The work features long strokes of colours such as bright green, blue, mauve and pink. The entire scene is under a jade and turquoise sky.

== Description ==
Mountains at Collioure was painted in mid-1905, while Derain was working with Henri Matisse, after being influenced by Vincent van Gogh. It is an example of Fauvist art. The trees and grass were painted with long strokes of colour. The colour which was used is known to have been less emotional than the colour which Van Gogh used. Mattise had joined Derain to paint landscapes at the fishing port of Collioure, at the bottom of the Pyrenees. The artists worked together producing artwork. The field in the foreground, the trees and the foothills are created in large strokes of bright green, blue, mauve and pink; which suggest a highly "charged" encounter with the natural world. The mountains are conceived as flat areas of colour. The whole scene is under a sky of jade and turquoise. In the painting the colour is less emotional than their past works and less imperative. According to Mattise, "Fauve art isn't everything, but it is the foundation of everything." Since 1982 it has been located in the National Gallery of Art after John Hay Whitney, a U.S. Ambassador to the United Kingdom, a publisher of the New York Herald Tribune and an art collector, died earlier that year.

== See also ==
- Landscape at Collioure by Henri Matisse
