= Hermann Bahr =

Austrian dramatic, publicist and writer

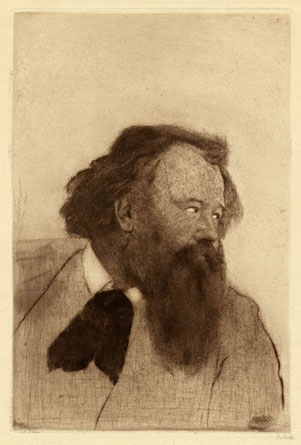
Hermann Bahr (1904 by Emil Orlik)

Hermann Anastas Bahr (German: [ˈhɛʁman ˈbaːɐ̯]; 19 July 1863 – 15 January 1934) was an Austrian writer, playwright, director, and critic.

== Biography ==
Born and raised in Linz, Bahr studied in Vienna, Graz, Czernowitz and Berlin, devoting special attention to philosophy, political economy, philology and law. During a prolonged stay in Paris, he discovered his interest in literature and art. He began working as an art critic, first in Berlin, then in Vienna. In 1890, he became associate editor of Berliner Freie Bühne (Berlin Free Stage), and later became associate editor and critic of the Deutsche Zeitung (German Newspaper). In 1891 he published Fin de siècle, a collection of short stories, six of which the Prussian authorities determined to be sexually obscene, fining Bahr 150 marks. The same year, he covered the Panama scandals and interviewed Émile Zola and met but did not interview Theodor Herzl, who was covering the same story.

In 1893, using his editorial mandate as a culture critic, Bahr toured several European countries, including Britain, Belgium, France, and Spain, to interview various notable figures about antisemitism. The interviews were published the next year as the book Der Antisemitismus: Ein internationales Interview. The format was inspired by an 1891 collection about literature, Enquête sur l'évolution littéraire, by the French journalist Jules Huret.

In 1894, Bahr began publication of Die Zeit (The Times), and was also editor of the Neue Wiener Tagblatt (New Vienna Daily Flyer) and the Oesterreichische Volkszeitung (Austrian Popular Newspaper).

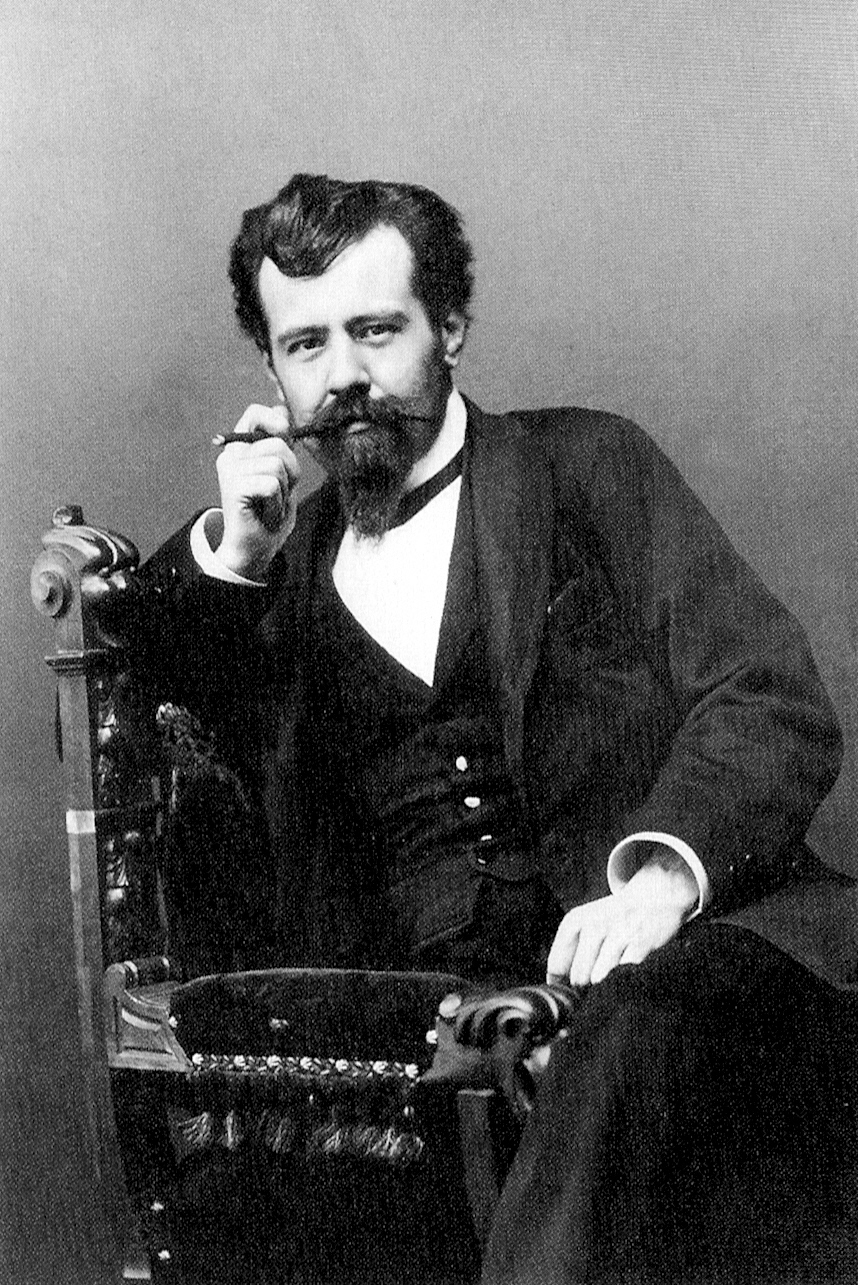
Bahr in 1891

In 1906–07, Bahr worked with Max Reinhardt as a director at the German Theater (German: Deutsches Theater) in Berlin, and starting in 1918 he was a Dramaturg with the Vienna Burgtheater.

Spokesman for the literary group Young Vienna, Bahr was an active member of the Austrian avant-garde, producing both criticism and Impressionist plays. His association with the coffeehouse literati made him one of the main targets of Karl Kraus's satirical journal Die Fackel (The Torch) after Kraus fell out with the group.

In 1901, after accusing Bahr and Emmerich Bukovics, then director of the Volkstheater, of corruption concerning the Villa Bahr in Ober St.Veit, Kraus lost his only civil law case ever.

Bahr was the first critic to apply the label modernism to literary works, and was an early observer of Expressionism. He analyzed the movement in his book Expressionism, published in 1916. His theoretical papers were important in the definition of new literary categories. His 40 plays and around 10 novels never reached the quality of his theoretical work. He died, aged 70, in Munich.

== Selected fiction ==
=== Plays ===
- The New People (Die neuen Menschen – 1887)
- The Mother (Die Mutter – 1891)
- Das Tschaperl (1897)
- Der Star (1899)
- Wienerinnen (1900)
- Der Krampus (1902)
- Ringelspiel (1907)
- The Concert (Das Konzert – 1909)
- The Children (Die Kinder – 1911)
- Das Prinzip (1912)
- Der Querulant (1914)
- The Master (Der Meister – 1904)

=== Short stories and novellas ===
- The School of Love (Die gute Schule. Seelenstände – 1890)
- Fin de siècle (1891)
- Die Rahl (1908)
- O Mensch (1910)
- Österreich in Ewigkeit (1929)

== Selected nonfiction ==
=== Essays ===
- Zur Kritik der Moderne (1890)
- Die Überwindung des Naturalismus (1891)
- Symbolisten (1894)
- Wiener Theater (1899)
- Frauenrecht (1912) eLibrary Austria Project (elib austria full text)
- Inventur (1912)
- Expressionism (Expressionismus – 1916)
- Burgtheater (1920)

=== Books ===
- Der Antisemitismus: Ein internationales Interview (1894)
- Theater (1897)
- Drut (1909)
- Himmelfahrt (1916)
- Die Rotte Korahs (1919)
- Self-Portrait (Selbstbildnis – 1923), an autobiography

== See also ==
- List of Austrian writers
