= The Arrow Maker =

- The Arrow Maker (1914)
- Written by: Mary Hunter Austin

Premiere
- Date: February 1911

The Arrow Maker is a play by Mary Hunter Austin meant to reflect American Indian life, especially of the Paiutes, in the Sierra Nevada of the United States.

== Motivation and history ==
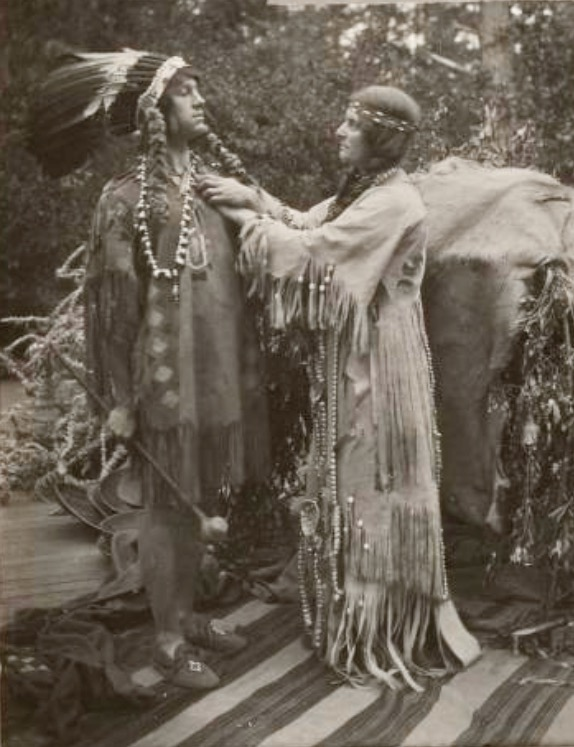
Charlotte Kellogg on right in the 1914 version of the play The Arrow Maker.

The Arrow Maker was first presented at the New Theatre in New York City under the management of Winthrop Ames, in February 1911, certain concessions had to be made, so the author confessed, "to what was thought to be the demand for a drama of Indian life which should present the Indian more nearly as he is popularly conceived." But, even in the presentation, care was taken that the music be reminiscent of Indian themes, that the chants be played from phonograph records of Indian ceremonials, that the dances be taught by one Chief Red Eagle, and that the costumes and properties have the authenticity of the American Museum of Natural History.

When the play was revised and issued in September 1915 by Houghton Mifflin, Boston. Its notes and glossary revealed Austin's desire to make The Arrow Maker an archaeologically correct representation of the Native Americans as known to her.

In August 1914, The Arrow Maker was produced by Austin at the Forest Theater in Carmel-by-the-Sea, California. Author Charlotte Kellogg, wife of biologist Vernon Lyman Kellogg played Chisera in the play. Novelist Harry Leon Wilson played Bright Water and Padahoon was played by writer John Northern Hilliard.

From 1921 through 1930 The Arrow Maker was staged outdoors as one of three "Desert Plays" in Tahquitz Canyon near Palm Springs, California.

== Plot ==
The central character in the drama, The Chisera, is a Medicine Woman of the Paiutes — who, in communion with the gods, is supposed to be as one removed from human passion. Those who come to her regard her as an intermediary, with the power of influencing the Great One. They all work her "to their best advantage." But The Chisera tires of her lonely occupation and gives her love to Simwa, the Arrow Maker. In the tribal matters that follow this complication the drama is a tragic revelation of Indian plotting and deceit. The Chisera is deserted by Simwa for the chief's daughter, and though this Medicine Woman has not been taught the potent exercise of hate, she ceases to exercise her power of intercession with the gods. And this brings misfortune to the tribe and grief to those involved in the way of Simwa and of one Padahoon, both rivals for tribal leadership. The final curtain falls on the death of The Chisera, mortally wounded by one of her own enchanted arrows.

== Genre ==
Apart from its archaeological faithfulness, The Arrow Maker is a dignified attempt to write an American Indian drama. It is the latest in a long line of Indian dramas the first of which, Robert Roger's Ponteach, was written in 1767.
