= Expressionism (book) =

1916 book by Hermann Bahr

- Author: Hermann Bahr
- Original title: Expressionismus
- Translator: R. T. Gribble
- Language: German
- Subject: Expressionism
- Publisher: Delphin-Verlag
- Publication date: 1916
- Publication place: Germany
- English publication date: 1925
- Pages: 170

Expressionism (German: Expressionismus) is a 1916 book by the Austrian writer Hermann Bahr. It is an analysis of the Expressionist movement and its approach to its time period, its relation to its predecessors and its view of the inner and outer life.

The English translation by R. T. Gribble was published by Frank Henderson in 1925. Ernest Boyd of Vanity Fair praised the book as the only theoretical work about Expressionism that is not "for the most part unintelligible", and described Bahr as "neither the high-priest of a cult nor the outraged philistine of culture".
