= Maria Adelaide Coelho da Cunha =

Portuguese socialite

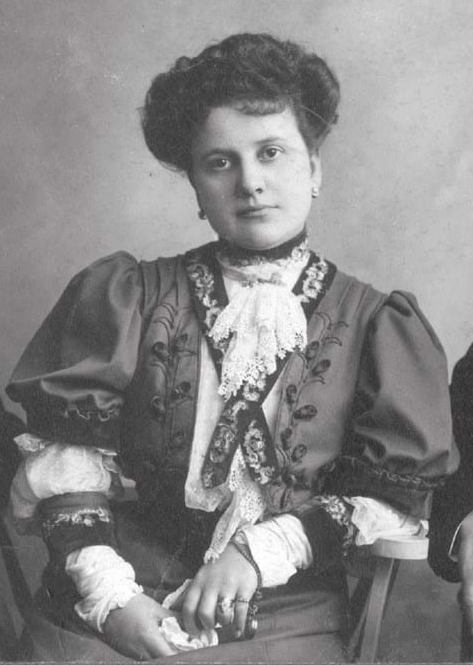
- Born: 13 October 1869; Lisbon, Portugal
- Died: 23 November 1954 (aged 85); Porto, Portugal
- Known for: Wrongful involuntary commitment

Maria Adelaide Coelho da Cunha (13 October 1869 – 23 November 1954) was a Portuguese socialite, and the daughter and heiress of Eduardo Coelho, founder of the major daily newspaper Diário de Notícias. She married Alfredo da Cunha, who succeeded Coelho in charge of the newspaper.

She became notorious, at age 48, for her scandalous elopement with the family chauffeur, Manuel Claro, 20 years her junior, and her subsequent wrongful psychiatric involuntary commitment and placement under judicial conservatorship.

== Biography ==
Shortly after Maria Adelaide Coelho da Cunha left her family home on 13 November 1918 without prior warning (sending back a note after reading about her disappearance in the newspapers, cryptically saying "I am alive but for all intents and purposes I consider myself dead and I would rather be considered so"), she was found to have eloped to Santa Comba Dão with the young family chauffeur, Manuel Claro. He was arrested and incarcerated in the Appellate Court Jail in Porto, while she was committed to the Count of Ferreira Psychiatric Hospital following the expert opinion of a medical panel comprising the country's leading psychiatrists, António Egas Moniz, Júlio de Matos, and José Sobral Cid.

Even though she publicly defended herself in the newspapers and published a book about her plight (Doida, Não!, published in 1920, followed by Doida, Não e Não! in 1923 after her husband replied to the first with Infelizmente Louca), her husband and then 26-year-old son retained possession of the family fortune, including Maria Adelaide's estate. Against her wishes, Alfredo da Cunha sold the Diário de Notícias in 1919 for a small fortune, 1500 contos de réis — after which point the paper openly started to defend the political, economic, and military sectors that would bring about the dictatorial Estado Novo regime in 1926.

Maria Adelaide Coelho da Cunha was released from involuntary commitment in 1919, but she remained under conservatorship until 1944, after the death of her husband. Manuel Claro was released from prison in January 1922. The two spent the rest of their lives together in Porto, although they never married, until Maria Adelaide's death in 1954.

The scandal was much talked-about at the time, and went on to inspire works such as Agustina Bessa-Luís's novel Doidos e Amantes (2005), and the movies Solo de Violino (1992, directed by Monique Rutler) and Ordem Moral (2020, directed by Mário Barroso).
