= Taos Pueblo (book) =

Photography book by Ansel Adams and Mary Hunter Austin

- Author: Ansel Adams, Mary Hunter Austin
- Genre: Photography
- Publication date: 1930

Taos Pueblo is a book by Ansel Adams and Mary Hunter Austin. Originally published in 1930, it is the first book of Adams' photographs. A seminal work in his career, it marks the beginning of a transition from his earlier pictorialist style to his signature sharp-focused images of the Western landscape. It has been described as "an astonishingly poignant…masterpiece" and "the greatest pictorial representation of the American West."

== Santa Fe ==
In the spring of 1929 Adams and his wife traveled to New Mexico to photograph the landscape there and to visit with friends. In Santa Fe, New Mexico they spent almost two months with writer Mary Hunter Austin, and within a short time Adams and Austin agreed that they should collaborate on a book about the area around Santa Fe. Austin introduced Adams to her friend and Santa Fe arts patron Mabel Dodge Luhan, whose husband Tony Lujan (she spelled her last name differently from her husband) was a member of the Taos tribal council. Through Lujan's influence, Adams was given permission by the Taos Indians to photograph in and around the then relatively unknown Taos Pueblo.

After taking some initial photographs, Adams contacted his friend and patron Albert M. Bender, who had previously produced Adams' first portfolio of prints Parmelian Prints of the High Sierras. Bender enthusiastically agreed to sponsor a book based on this new work, and he contacted his friends at the Grabhorn Press to produce it. Adams and Austin continued to work independently on their respective parts of the book; they did not see each other's work until the book was ready to print. Adams said he picked the final selection of images to match Austin's prose, and in part because of this her text is said to have "mirrored the sturdy repetitions of the pueblo architecture" as seen in many of the photographs.

St. Francis Church, Ranchos de Taos, New Mexico, one of twelve photographs by Ansel Adams in Taos Pueblo.

== San Francisco de Asis Mission Church ==
In spite of the book's title one of Adams' signature images from the book was taken at San Francisco de Asis Mission Church, which is not part of the pueblo itself but is located several miles away. He was captivated by the massive walls and buttresses of the church, saying they "seem an outcropping of the earth rather than merely an object constructed upon it." At the same time, the church was an embodiment of the ongoing cultural conflicts in the area between the Indian and Hispanic cultures; it was a Catholic church built in Indian style and represented how the Taos Indians' survival was achieved in part through cultural adaptation by necessity.

== Special paper ==
Although it was published in book form, Taos Pueblo was illustrated with true photographic prints hand-produced by Adams. Adams insisted that the book have a consistent appearance throughout, and to meet his high standards a special paper was created that was used for both the text and the photographs. To do this he enlisted the help of Will Dassonville, a friend and producer of photographic papers in the Bay Area. Dassonville ordered a warm-colored, rag-base paper from a New England mill, then divided the order into two batches. The first went to the Grabhorn Press for the text pages, and the second was custom-coated by Dassonville with a silver-bromide emulsion. Adams was able to print directly on the latter paper, which had an exceptional tonal range and a matte surface, and develop it in his darkroom. Over a period of several months during the fall of 1929, Adams personally made nearly 1,300 prints for the book edition.

== Editions ==
The book was published by in a limited edition of 100 signed and numbered copies, plus eight artist's copies, each containing twelve original prints. The folio was hand bound in quarter tan morocco leather over orange buckram by Hazel Dreis. Bender set the price of the book at $75 per copy, which was a very high figure during the Great Depression when the average annual income for an American family was about $1,300. Bender, however, reached out to his wealthy friends, and within two years the edition was sold out. Bender quipped: "I note the Stock Market reports only Ansel Adams photographs as the sole commodity that is on the rise."

With the cooperation of Adams, in 1977 the New York Graphic Society published a facsimile edition of the original, using gravure prints rather than original photographs. It was produced in a limited edition of 950 copies, each signed by Adams. In the afterword to that edition, photographic historian Weston Naef wrote:

With Taos Pueblo we see a commitment to light and form as the essential building blocks of a picture. Every exposure was made in the most brilliant sunshine which in turn created deep shadows. Sunlight and shadow are at the same time the photographer’s friend and foe. Neither films nor papers can record the two extremes of bright sun and deep shadow equally well, and an unhappy tonal compromise is often the result. Rich shadow detail is here realized simultaneously with delicate highlights in a way that proves Adams’ native sense for the toughest technical problems of the medium, and how to solve them.”

In September, 2011, a copy of the original 1930 edition was offered for sale for $85,000. In 2014, rare book dealers were offering available original copies for $65,000 and $75,000 and between about $900 and $3,000 for the 1977 facsimile edition.
