= André Derain =

French artist (1880–1954)

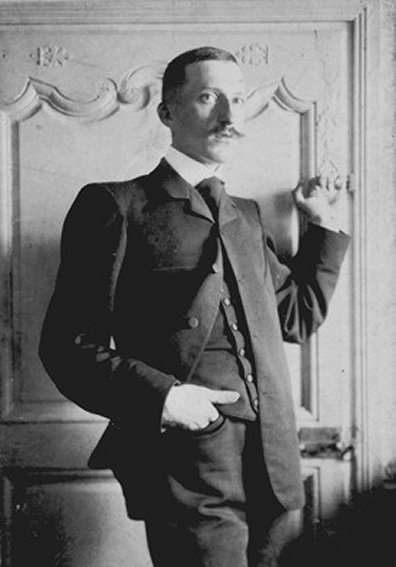
- Derain in 1903
- Born: 17 June 1880; Chatou, Yvelines, Île-de-France, France
- Died: 8 September 1954 (aged 74); Garches, Hauts-de-Seine, Île-de-France, France
- Education: Académie Camillo, Académie Julian
- Known for: Painting, sculpture
- Movement: Fauvism

André Derain (/dəˈræ̃/; French: [ɑ̃dʁe dəʁɛ̃]; 17 June 1880 – 8 September 1954) was a French artist, painter, sculptor and co-founder, with Henri Matisse, of Fauvism. His paintings of 1905–1906 are characterized by riotous colourism in the Fauve style. By 1910, however, his work had become more austere as a result of his study of Cézanne and the old masters. After the First World War, Derain became one of the leaders of the new classicism in the arts known as the Return to order.

== Life and career ==
=== Early years ===
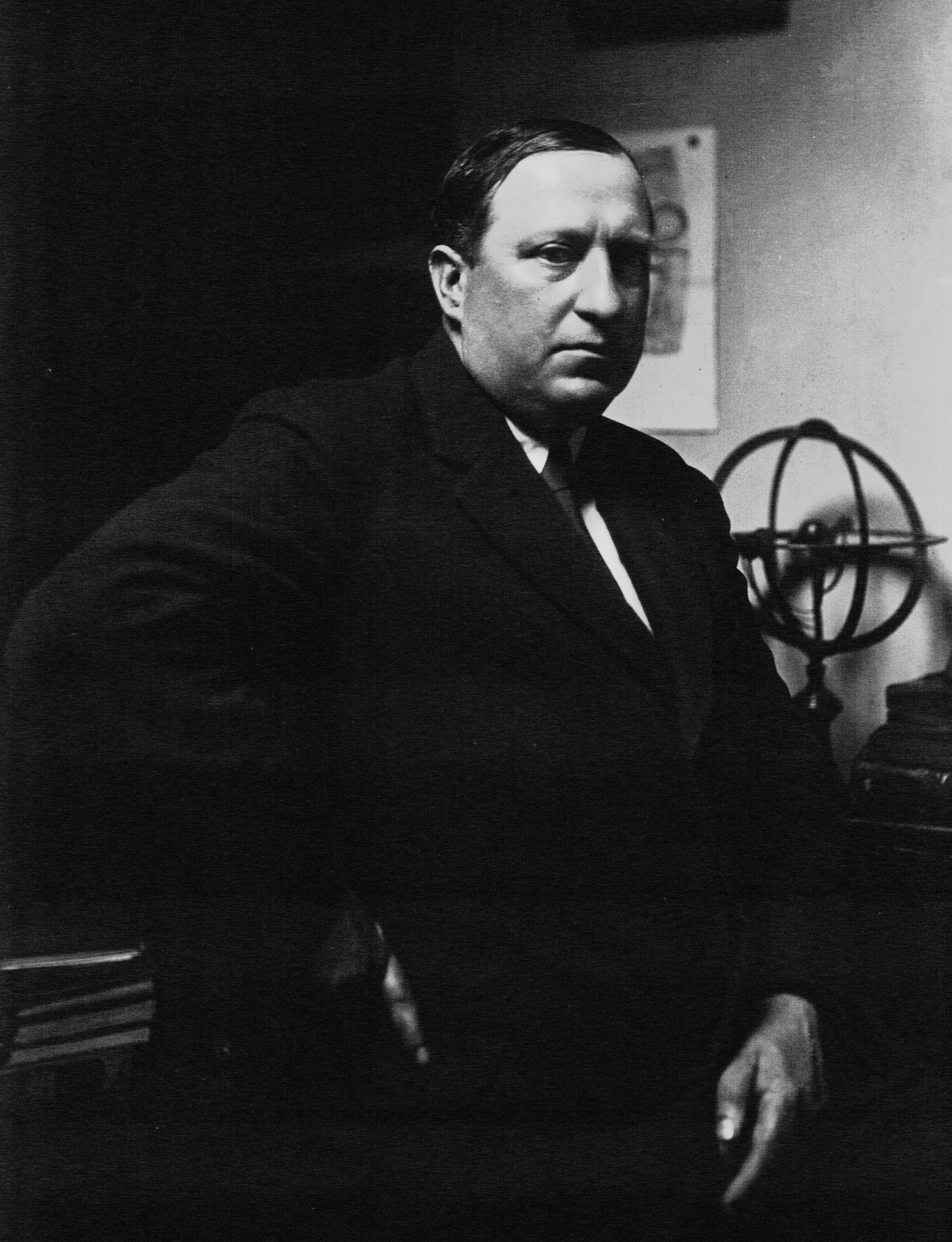
André Derain in 1928

Derain was born in 1880 in Chatou, Yvelines, Île-de-France, just outside Paris. In 1895 he began to study on his own, contrary to claims that meeting Vlaminck or Matisse began his efforts to paint, and occasionally went to the countryside with an old friend of Cézanne's, Father Jacomin along with his two sons. In 1898, while studying to be an engineer at the Académie Camillo, he attended painting classes under Eugène Carrière, and there met Matisse. In 1900, he met and shared a studio with Maurice de Vlaminck and together they began to paint scenes in the neighbourhood, but this was interrupted by military service at Commercy from September 1901 to 1904. Following his release from service, Matisse persuaded Derain's parents to allow him to abandon his engineering career and devote himself solely to painting; subsequently Derain attended the Académie Julian.

=== Fauvism ===
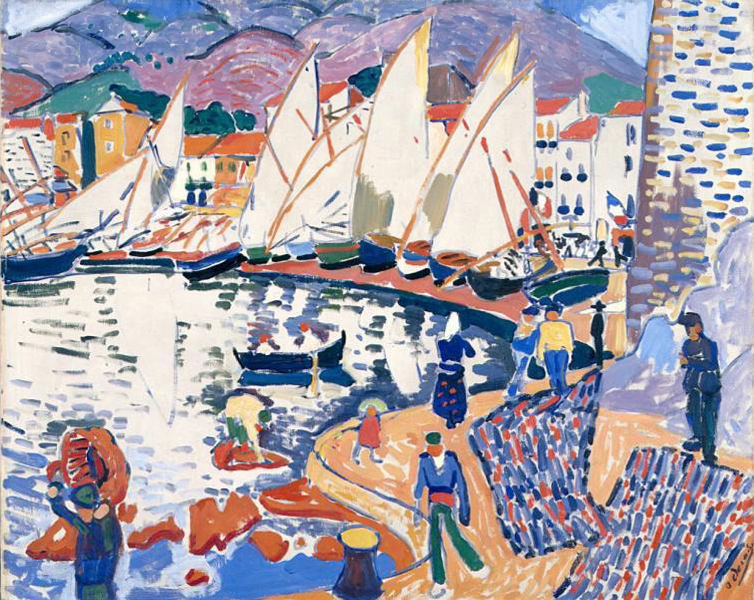
Le séchage des voiles (The Drying Sails), 1905, oil on canvas, 82 × 101 cm, Pushkin Museum, Moscow. Exhibited at the 1905 Salon d'Automne

Derain and Matisse worked together through the summer of 1905 in the Mediterranean village of Collioure and Derain completed the Mountains at Collioure painting. Later that year they displayed their highly innovative paintings at the Salon d'Automne. The vivid, unnatural colors led the critic Louis Vauxcelles to derisively dub their works as les Fauves, or "the wild beasts", marking the start of the Fauvist movement. (In 2023, the Metropolitan Museum of Art and the Museum of Fine Arts, Houston, co-organized and exhibited Vertigo of Color: Matisse, Derain, and the Origins of Fauvism, an exhibit examining their work together and the birth of Fauvism.)

In March 1906, the noted art dealer Ambroise Vollard sent Derain to London to produce a series of paintings with the city as subject. In 30 paintings (29 of which are still extant), Derain presented a portrait of London that was radically different from anything done by previous painters of the city such as Whistler or Monet. With bold colors and compositions, Derain painted multiple pictures of the Thames and Tower Bridge. These London paintings remain among his most popular work. Art critic T. G Rosenthal: "Not since Monet has anyone made London seem so fresh and yet remain quintessentially English. Some of his views of the Thames use the Pointillist technique of multiple dots, although by this time, because the dots have become much larger, it is rather more simply the separation of colours called Divisionism and it is peculiarly effective in conveying the fragmentation of colour in moving water in sunlight."

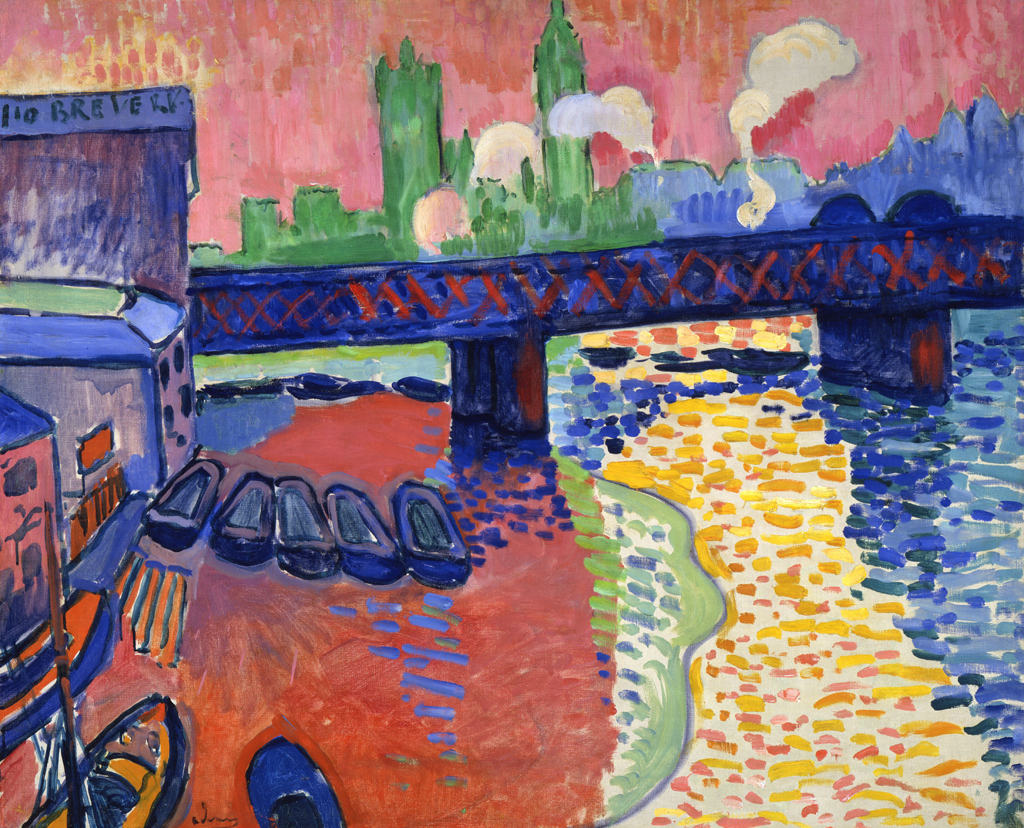
Charing Cross Bridge, London, 1906, National Gallery of Art, Washington, D.C.

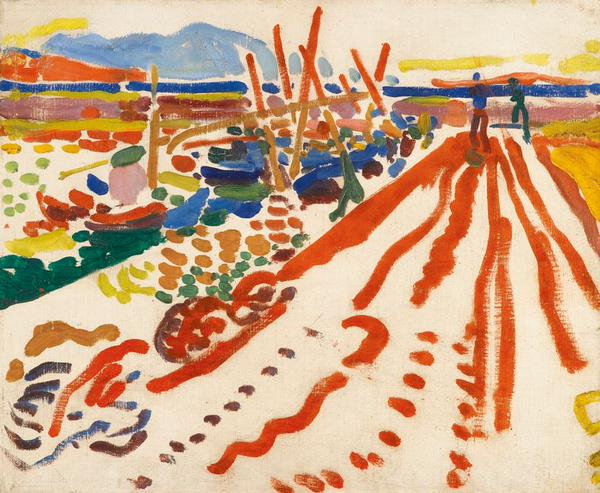
La jetée à L'Estaque, 1906, oil on canvas, 38 × 46 cm

In 1907 art dealer Daniel-Henry Kahnweiler purchased Derain's entire studio, granting Derain financial stability. He experimented with stone sculpture and moved to Montmartre to be near his friend Pablo Picasso and other noted artists. Fernande Olivier, Picasso's mistress at the time, described Derain as:

Slim, elegant, with a lively colour and enamelled black hair. With an English chic, somewhat striking. Fancy waistcoats, ties in crude colours, red and green. Always a pipe in his mouth, phlegmatic, mocking, cold, an arguer.

At Montmartre, Derain began to shift from the brilliant Fauvist palette to more muted tones, showing the influence of Cubism and Paul Cézanne. (According to Gertrude Stein, Derain may have been influenced by African sculpture before Picasso.) Derain supplied woodcuts in primitivist style for an edition of Guillaume Apollinaire's first book of prose, L'enchanteur pourrissant (1909). He displayed works at the Neue Künstlervereinigung in Munich in 1910, in 1912 at the secessionist Der Blaue Reiter and in 1913 at the seminal Armory Show in New York. He also illustrated a collection of poems by Max Jacob in 1912.

=== Towards a new classicism ===
At about this time Derain's work began overtly reflecting his study of the Old Masters. The role of colour was reduced and forms became austere; the years 1911–1914 are sometimes referred to as his gothic period. In 1914 he was mobilized for military service in World War I and until his release in 1919 he would have little time for painting, although in 1916 he provided a set of illustrations for André Breton's first book, Mont de Piete.

After the war, Derain gained recognition as a figure in the renewed classicist movement. His Fauve period had ended, and he was regarded as a traditionalist. In 1919, he designed the ballet La Boutique fantasque for Diaghilev's Ballets Russes.Its success led to further ballet design commissions.

The 1920s marked the height of his success, as he was awarded the Carnegie Prize in 1928 for his Still-life with Dead Game and began to exhibit extensively abroad—in London, Berlin, Frankfurt, Düsseldorf, New York City and Cincinnati, Ohio.

During the German occupation of France in World War II, Derain lived primarily in Paris and was much courted by the Germans because he represented the prestige of French culture. Derain accepted an invitation to make an official visit to Germany in 1941, and traveled with other French artists to Berlin to attend a Nazi exhibition of an officially endorsed artist, Arno Breker. Derain's presence in Germany was used effectively by Nazi propaganda, and after the Liberation he was branded a collaborator and ostracized by many former supporters.

A year before his death, he contracted an eye infection from which he never fully recovered. He died in Garches, Hauts-de-Seine, Île-de-France, France in 1954 when he was struck by a moving vehicle.

Derain's London paintings were the subject of a major exhibition at the Courtauld Institute from 27 October 2005 to 22 January 2006.

In 2025, all of Derain's work entered the public domain in the United States.

== Gallery ==
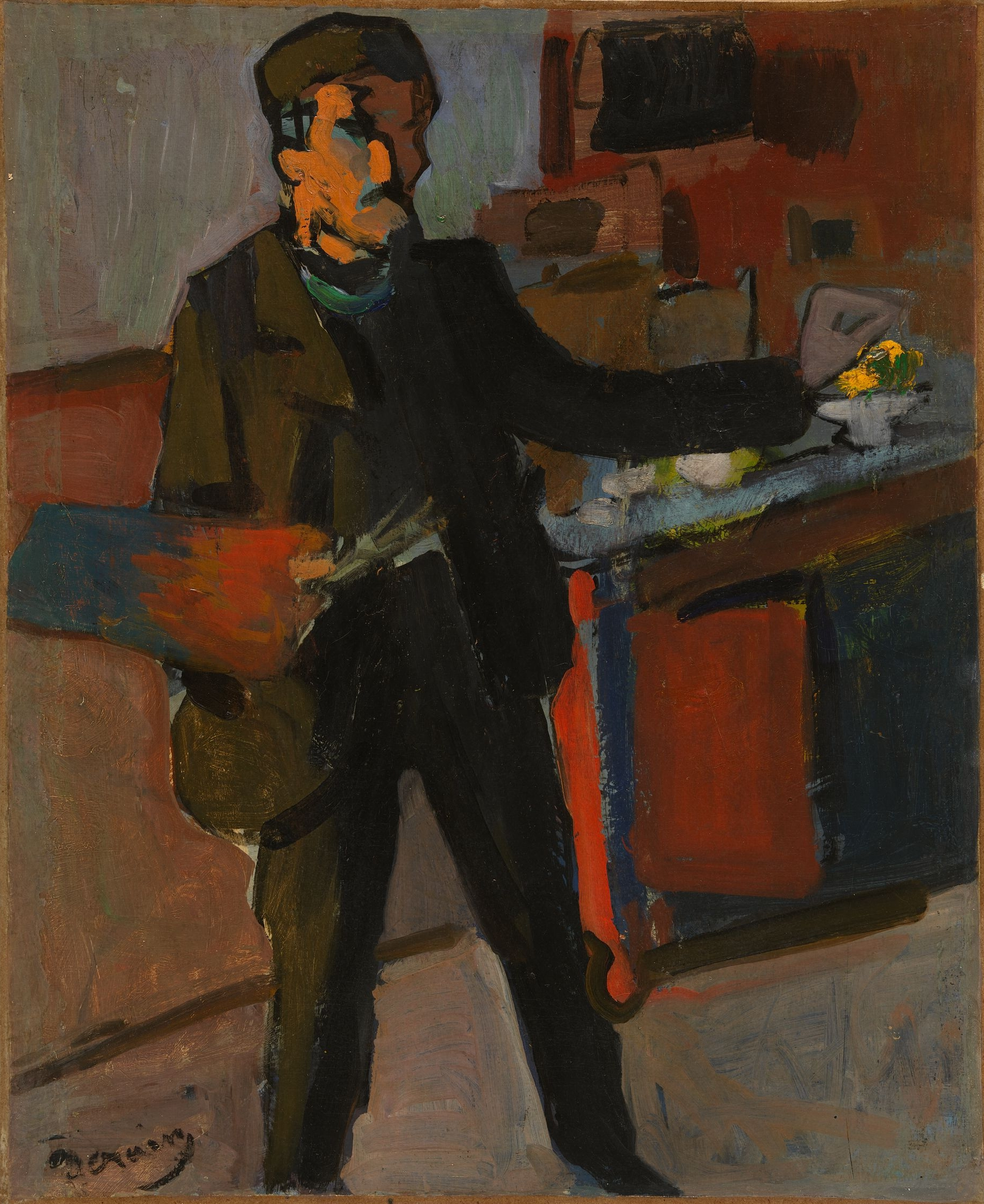
Self-portrait in studio, c. 1903, oil on canvas, 42.2 × 34.6 cm, National Gallery of Australia

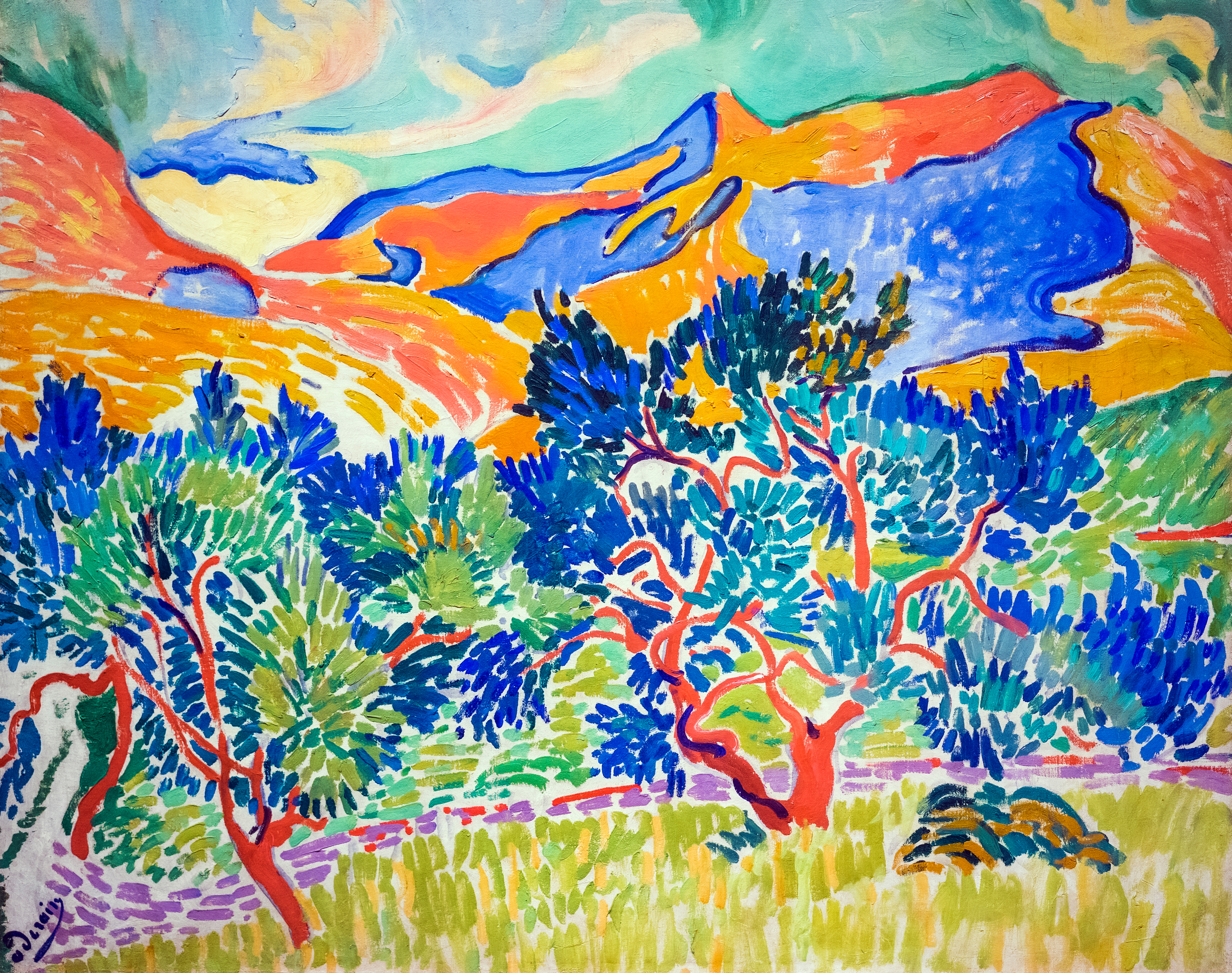
Mountains at Collioure, 1905, oil on canvas, 81.3 × 100.3 cm, National Gallery of Art

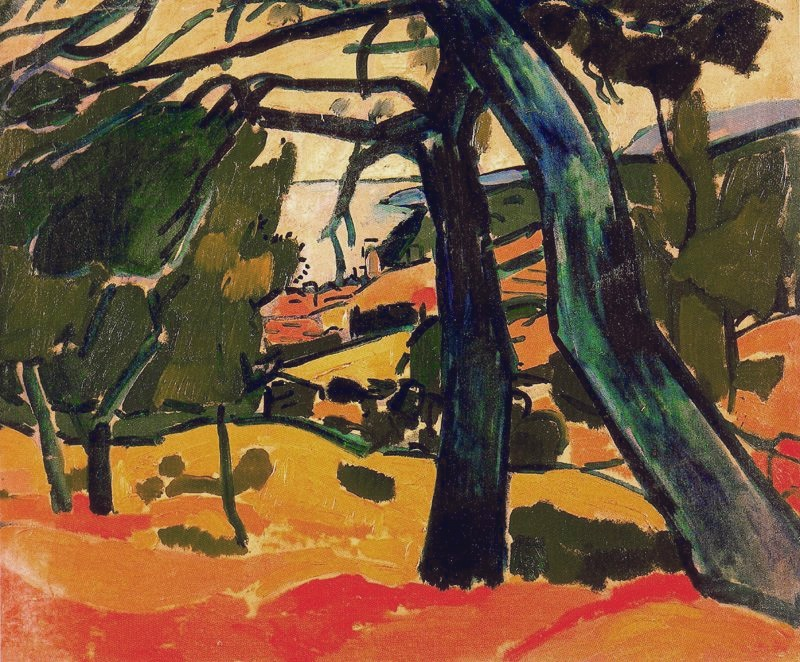
Pinède à Cassis (Landscape), 1907, oil on canvas, 54 × 65 cm, Musée Cantini, Marseille

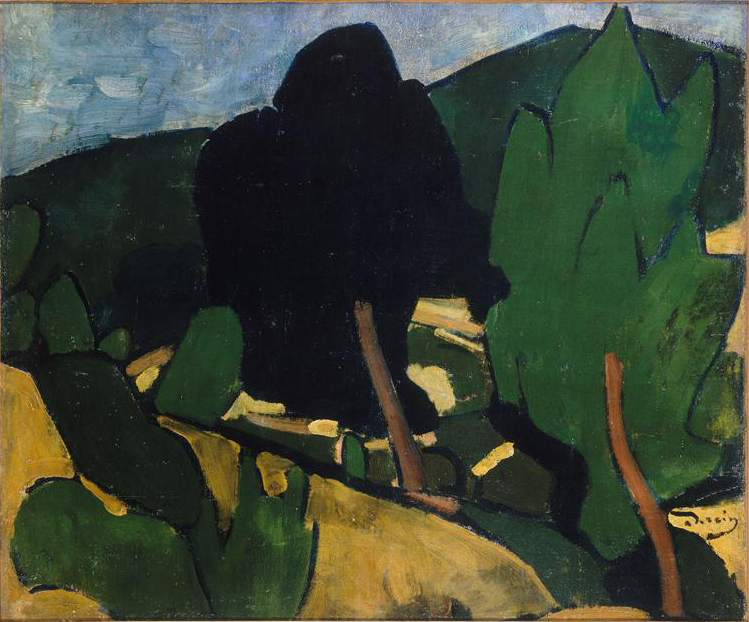
Paysage à Cassis, 1907, oil on canvas, 54 × 64 cm, Musée d'art moderne de Troyes

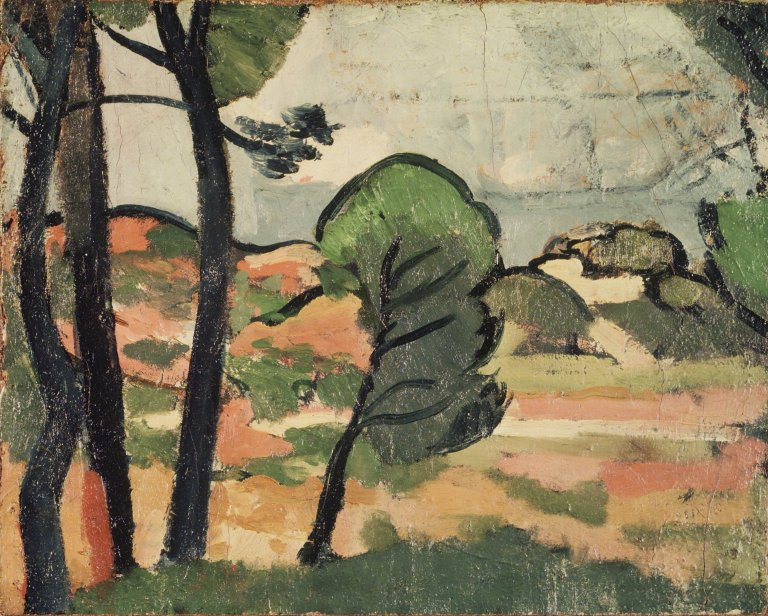
Landscape in Provence (Paysage de Provence), c. 1908, oil on canvas, 32.2 × 40.6 cm, Brooklyn Museum, Brooklyn

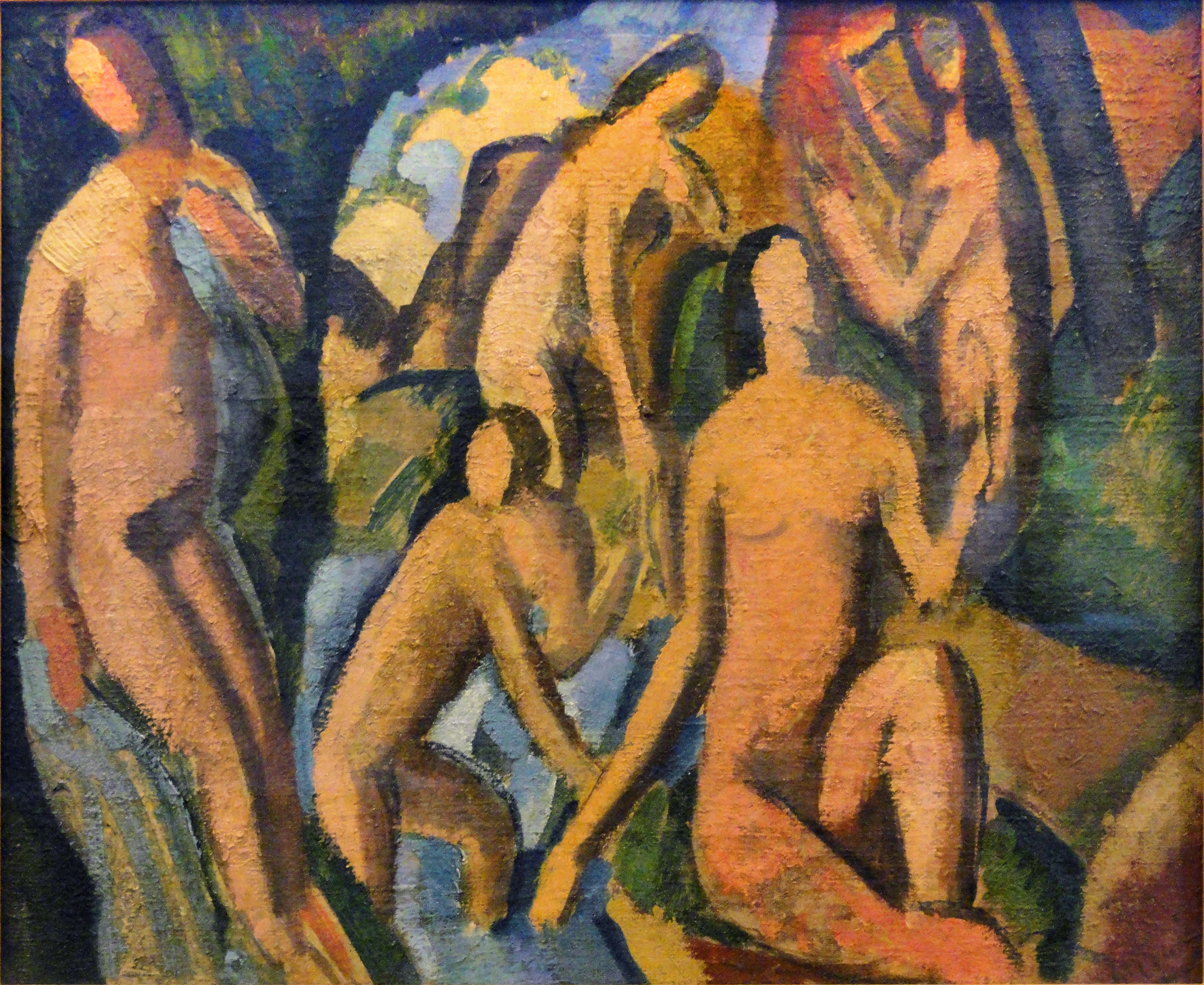
Baigneuses (Esquisse), c. 1908, oil on canvas, 38 × 46 cm, Musée d'Art Moderne de la Ville de Paris

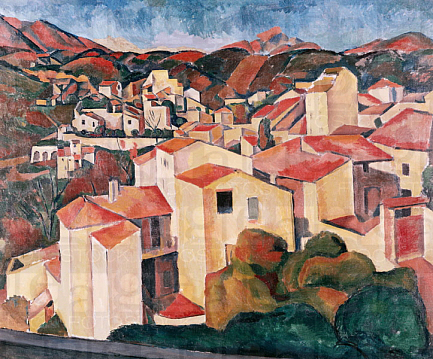
View of Cagnes, 1910, oil on canvas, Museum Folkwang, Essen, Germany

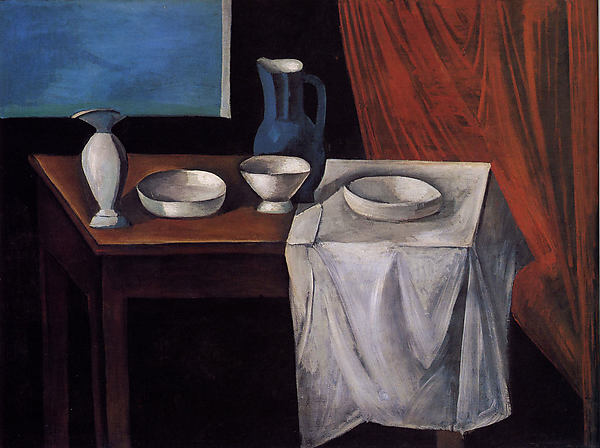
La Table (The Table), 1911, oil on canvas, 96.5 × 131.1 cm, Metropolitan Museum of Art, New York

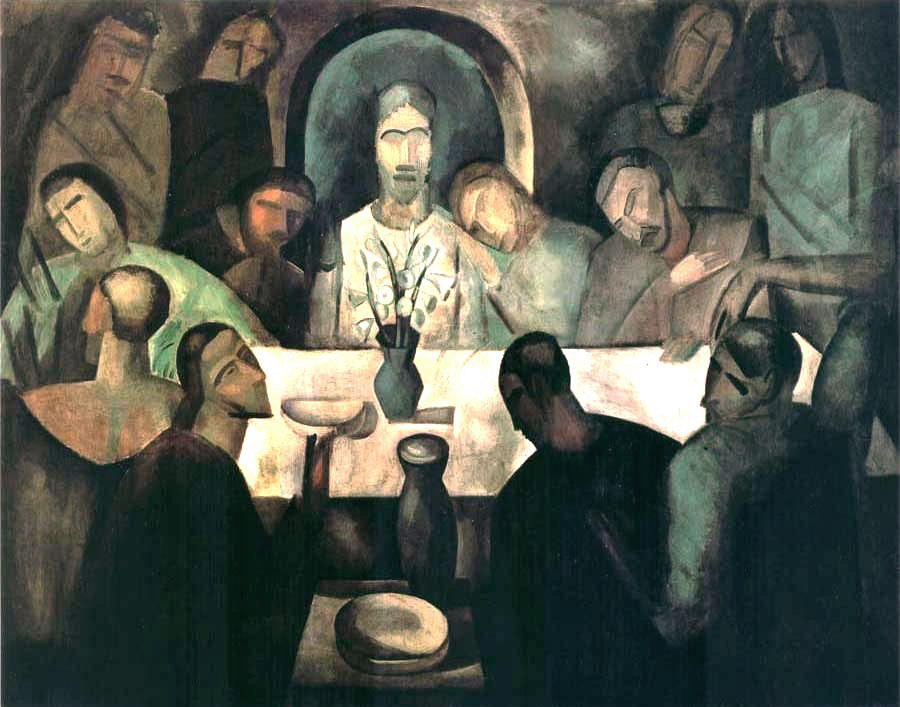
The Last Supper, 1911, oil on canvas, 227.3 × 288.3 cm, Art Institute of Chicago

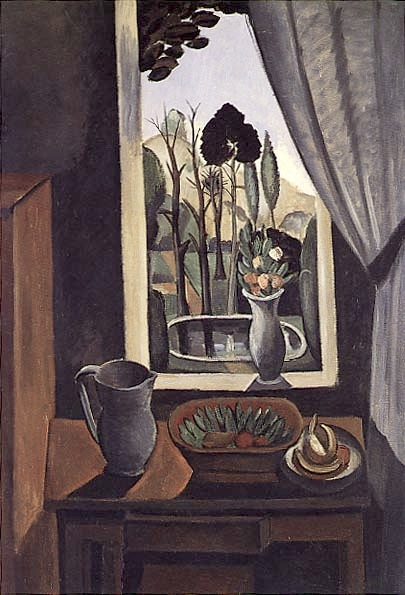
Window on the Park (La Fenêtre sur le parc), 1912, oil on canvas, 130.8 × 89.5 cm, Museum of Modern Art

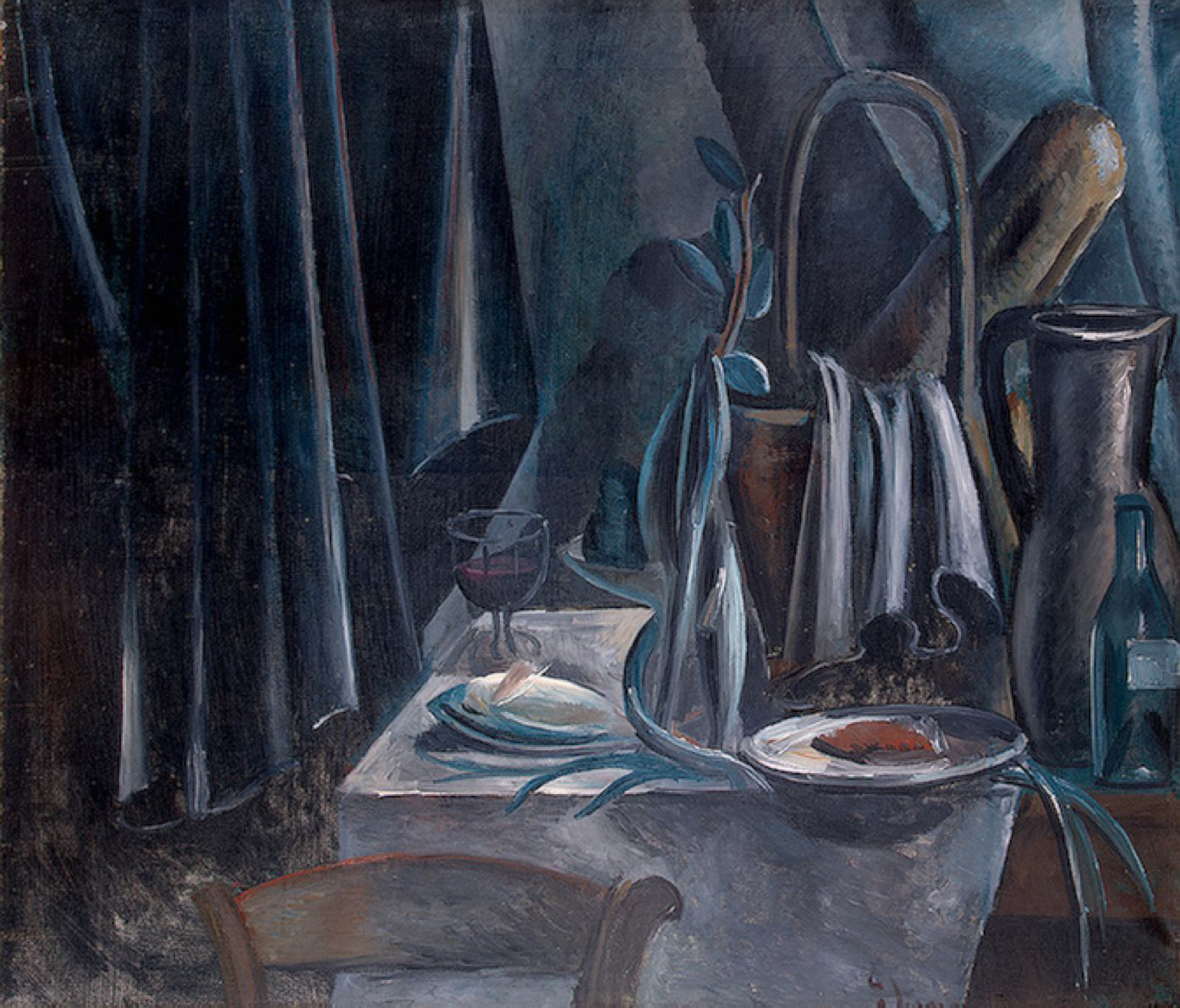
Nature morte (Still Life), 1912, oil on canvas, 100.5 × 118 cm, The State Hermitage Museum, Saint Petersburg, Russia. Reproduced in Du "Cubisme", 1912

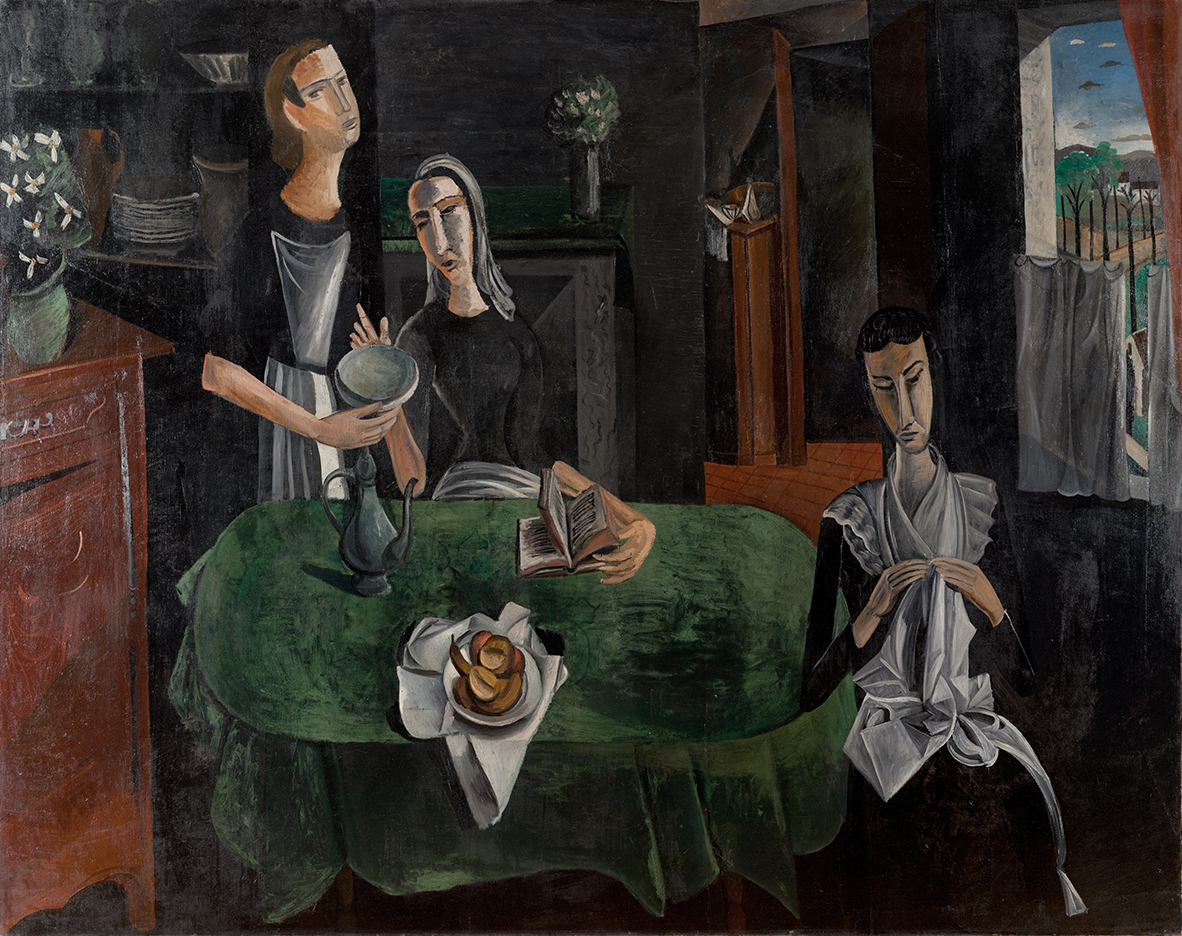
Le Samedi, 1913–14, oil on canvas, 181 × 228 cm, Pushkin Museum, Moscow

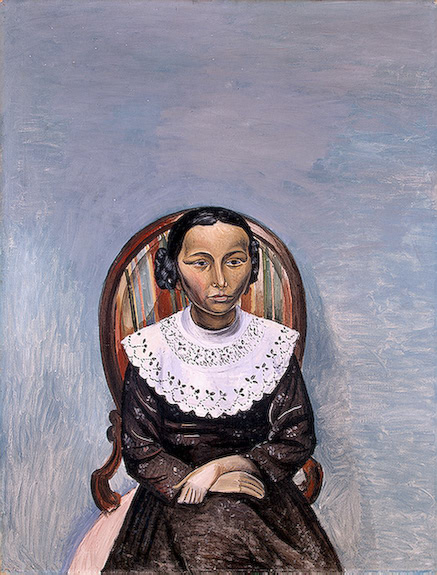
Portrait of a Girl in Black, 1913, Hermitage Museum

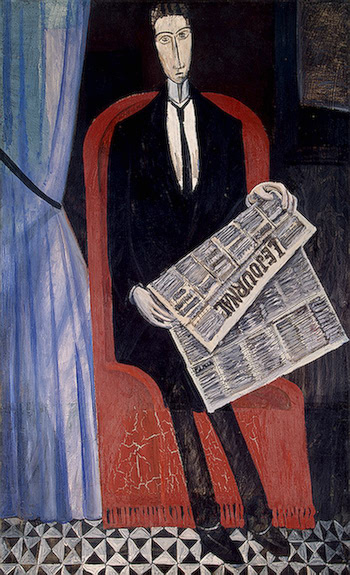
Portrait of a Man with a Newspaper, 1911–1914, Hermitage Museum

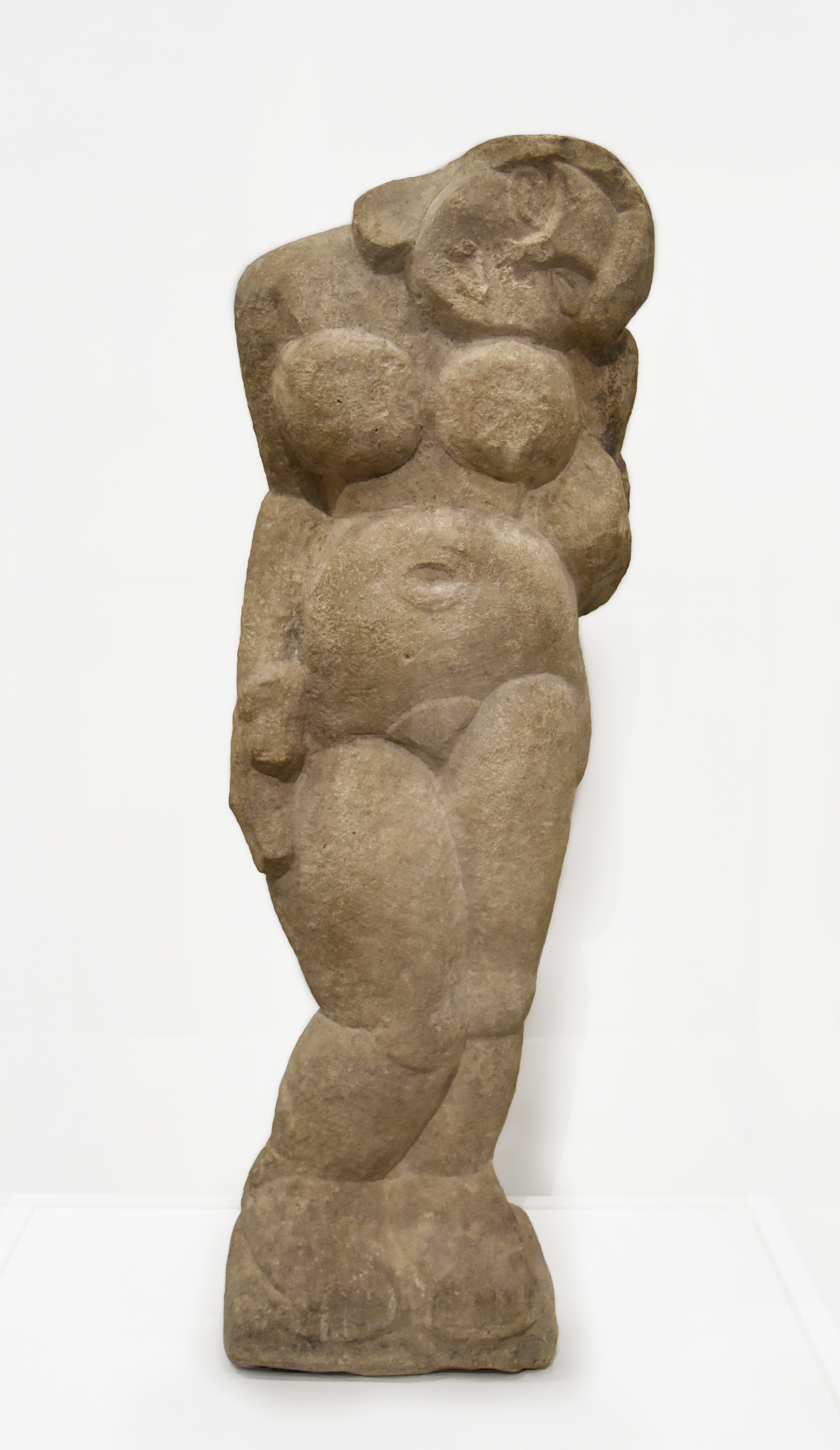
Nu debout, 1907 (Automne), limestone, 95 x 33 x 17 cm, Musée National d'Art Moderne

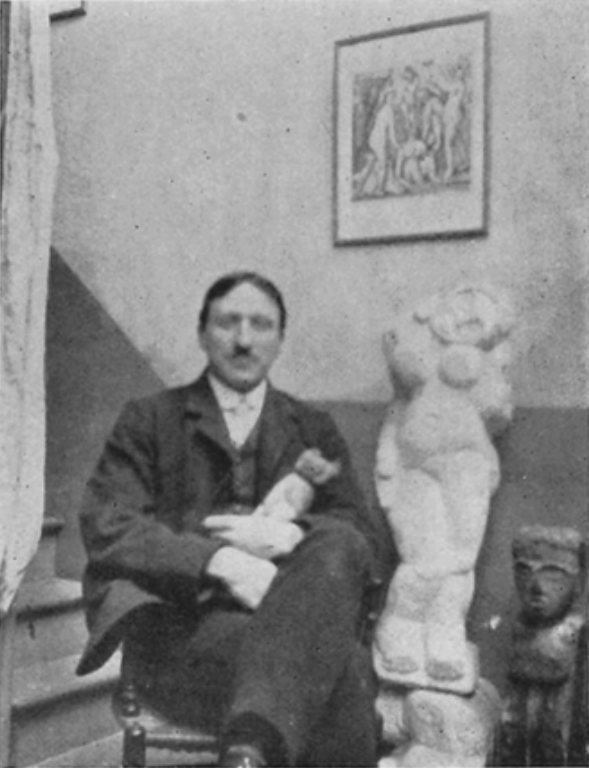
Photograph of Derain published in Gelett Burgess, "The Wild Men of Paris", Architectural Record, May 1910. Sculpture: Nu debout (Standing Woman), 1907

== Nazi-looted art ==
In 2020, a French court ordered that three paintings by Derain, Paysage à Cassis (ou Vue de Cassis), La Chapelle-sous-Crécy were restituted and Pinède, Cassis should be restituted to the heirs of René Gimpel, from whom they had been looted during the Nazi occupation of France. Gimpel's family had submitted the claim in 2013. In 2023 Derain's Still Life With a Bottle was restituted to the heirs of Dane Reichsmann, who was murdered in Auschwitz with his wife.

== Public collections ==
Among the public collections holding works by André Derain are:

- Brooklyn Museum
- Buffalo AKG Art Museum
- Museum of Fine Arts, Ghent, Gent
- Museum of Modern Art, New York
- Museum de Fundatie, Zwolle, Netherlands
- Metropolitan Museum of Art, New York City
- Thyssen-Bornemisza National Museum
- Auckland Art Gallery, New Zealand
- Columbus Museum of Art, Ohio
