= Mary Hunter Austin =

American writer (1868–1934)

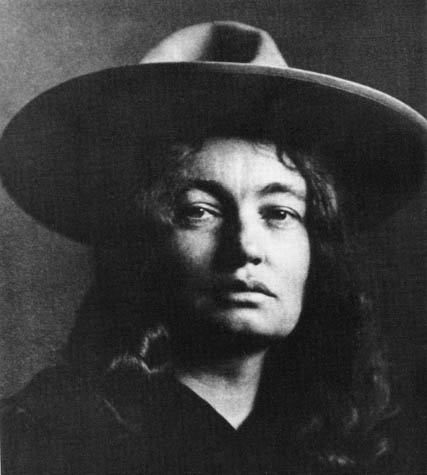
- Austin c. 1900
- Born: Mary Hunter; September 9, 1868; Carlinville, Illinois, US
- Died: August 13, 1934 (aged 65); Santa Fe, New Mexico, US
- Education: Blackburn College
- Occupation: Writer
- Spouse: Stafford Wallace Austin
- Relatives: Mary Hunter Wolf (niece)

Mary Hunter Austin (September 9, 1868 – August 13, 1934) was an American writer. One of the early nature writers of the American Southwest, her classic The Land of Little Rain (1903) describes the fauna, flora, and people of the region between the High Sierra and the Mojave Desert of southern California.

== Early years and education ==
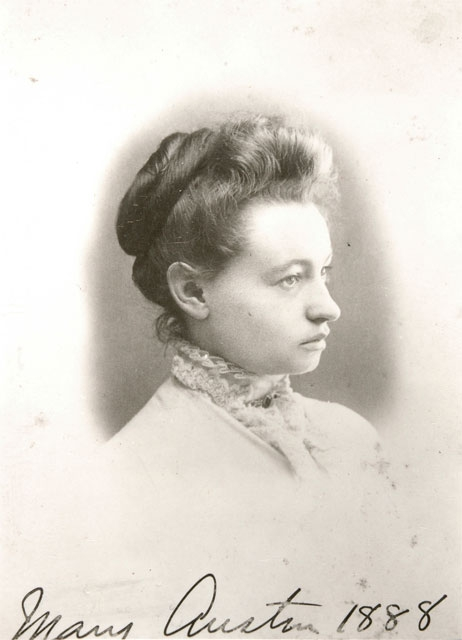
Graduation photograph of Mary Hunter Austin, 1888

Mary Hunter Austin was born on September 9, 1868, in Carlinville, Illinois (the fourth of six children) to Susannah (née Graham) and George Hunter. She graduated from Blackburn College in 1888. Her family moved to California in the same year and established a homestead in the San Joaquin Valley.

== Marriage ==
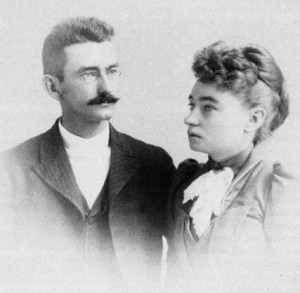
Wedding portrait of Stafford Wallace Austin and Mary Hunter Austin, 1891.

She married Stafford Wallace Austin on May 18, 1891, in Bakersfield, California. He was from Hawaii, a graduate of the University of California, Berkeley, a United States General Land Office employee, and, later, a Potash War lawyer.

== Career ==
For 17 years, Austin made a special study of the lives of the indigenous peoples of the Mojave Desert. Her publications set forth the intimate knowledge she thus acquired. She was a prolific novelist, poet, critic, and playwright, as well as an early feminist and defender of Native American and Spanish-American rights.

Austin is best known for her tribute to the deserts of California, The Land of Little Rain (1903). Her play The Arrow Maker, dealing with Indian life, was produced at the New Theatre (New York) in 1911, the same year she published a rhapsodic tribute to her acquaintance H. G. Wells as a producer of "informing, vitalizing, indispensable books" in the American Magazine.

Austin and her husband were involved in the local California Water Wars, after which the water of Owens Valley eventually was drained to supply Los Angeles.

When the battle was lost, after the 1906 San Francisco earthquake, Stafford moved to Death Valley and Mary relocated to the art colony at Carmel-by-the-Sea, California. There Austin was part of the cultural circle that included Jack London, Ambrose Bierce, Harry Leon Wilson, George Sterling, Nora May French, Arnold Genthe, James Hopper, Alice MacGowan, Joaquin Miller, Gelett Burgess, Sinclair Lewis, and Xavier Martinez. Two years after developing a friendship with Austin in 1904, Sterling enticed her to join him in Carmel.

In 1906, she had a tree house constructed, that she called “Wick-i-up”, built by M.J. Murphy, based on a design by San Francisco architect Louis Christian Mullgardt. She wrote much of her writings from this tree house. Austin hired Murphy in 1907 to create a Craftsman-style cottage she called "Rose Cottage." The property is located at the intersection of 4th Avenue and Monte Verde Street. The cottage has gardens and two gates with paths leading to it. At this cottage, she entertained her friends, including London, Sterling, and Lewis. Today, the cottage is listed as the Mary Austin House with the Carmel Inventory Of Historic Resources, and was recorded with the Department of Parks and Recreation as significant under California register criterion as the home of one of the bohemian founders of the artist colony at Carmel.

Austin was one of the founders of the local Forest Theater, where in 1913 she premiered and directed her three-act play Fire. In July 1914, she joined William Merritt Chase, the distinguished New York painter who was teaching his last summer class in Carmel, at several society "teas" and privately in his studio, where he finished her portrait. The well-known artist Jennie V. Cannon reported that he began the painting as a class demonstration after Austin claimed that two of her portraits, which were executed by famous artists in the Latin Quarter of Paris, had already been accepted to the Salon. Apparently, Chase was not deterred by Austin's "pushiness and claims to extra-sensory perceptions", but was more interested in her appointment as director of East Coast publicity for San Francisco's Panama–Pacific International Exposition. On July 25, 1914, Chase attended her Indian melodrama in the Forest Theater, The Arrow Maker, and confessed to Cannon that he found the play dreary. Apparently, Dr. Daniel MacDougal, head of the local Carnegie Institute, paid for most of her production costs, because of his not-so-secret love affair with the writer. In August 1914, one of Chase's students, Helena Wood Smith, was strangled and buried on the beach by her lover, art-photographer George Kodani, Austin joined the mob who disparaged local authorities for their alleged incompetence. After 1914 her visits to Carmel were relatively brief.

After visiting Santa Fe in 1918, Austin helped establish The Santa Fe Little Theatre (still operating today as The Santa Fe Playhouse) and directed the group's first production held February 14, 1919, at the art museum's St. Francis Auditorium. Austin also was active in preserving the local culture of New Mexico, establishing the Spanish Colonial Arts Society in 1925 with artist Frank Applegate.

In 1929, while living in New Mexico, Austin co-authored a book with photographer Ansel Adams. Published a year later, the book, Taos Pueblo, was printed in a limited edition of only 108 copies. It now is quite rare because, rather than reproductions, it included photographs made by Adams.

== Death and legacy ==
Austin died August 13, 1934, in Santa Fe.

Mount Mary Austin, in the Sierra Nevada, was named in her honor. It is located 8.5 miles west of her long time home in Independence, California.

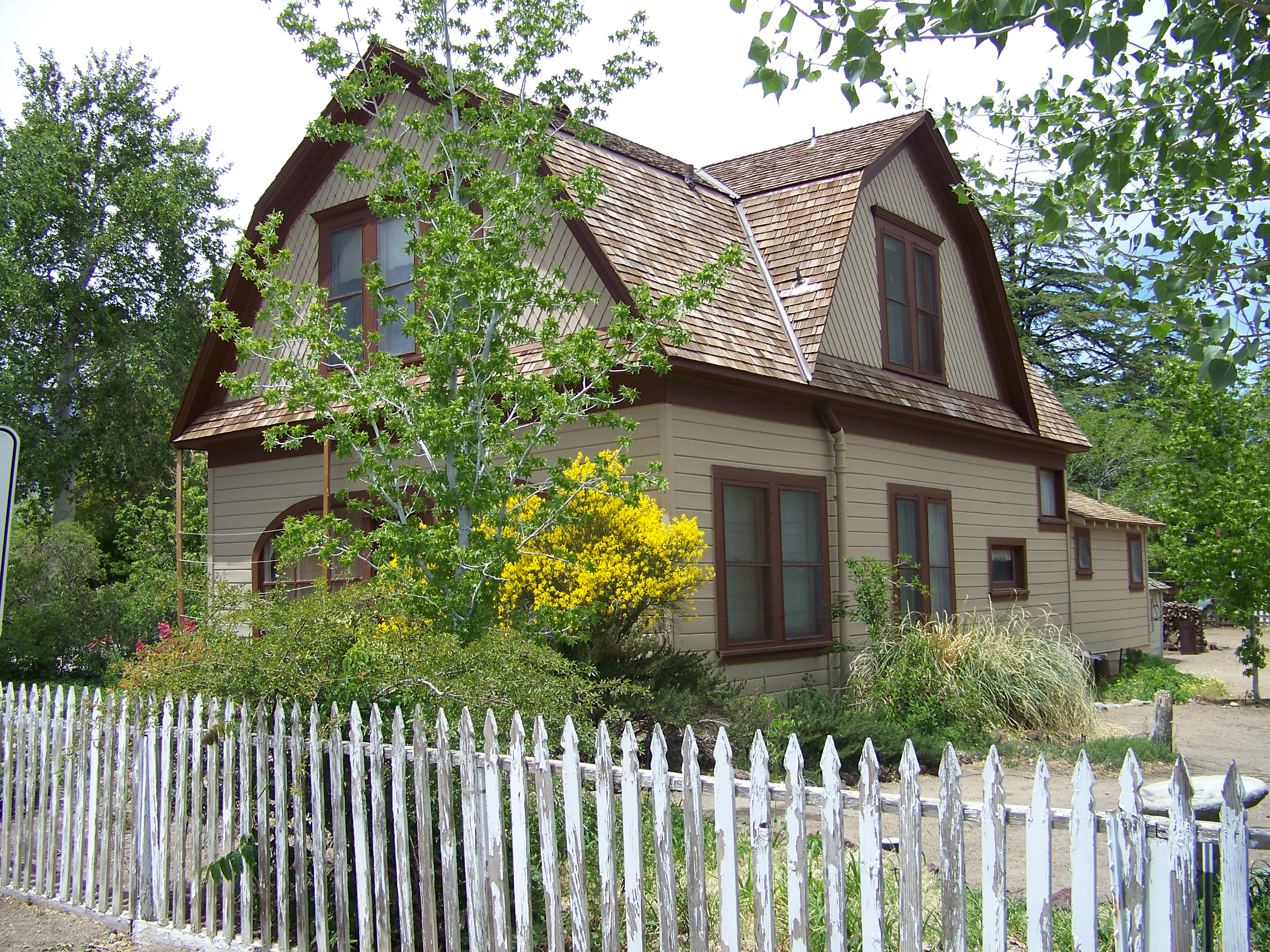
Mary Hunter Austin wrote about her Independence, California, home in The Land of Little Rain

The Austin home in Independence, California, designed and built by the couple, became a California Historical Landmark.

- The California Historical Landmark reads:

CHL No. 229 Austin Home - Inyo NO. 229 MARY AUSTIN'S HOME - Mary Austin, author of The Land of Little Rain and other volumes that picture the beauty of Owens Valley, lived in Independence. "But if ever you come beyond the borders as far as the town that lies in a hill dimple at the foot of Kearsarge, never leave it until you have knocked at the door of the brown house under the willow-tree at the end of the village street, and there you shall have such news of the land, of its trails and what is astir in them, as one lover of it can give to another ..." excerpt from The Land of Little Rain.

Her home in Santa Fe, at 439 Camino del Monte Sol, is listed on the National Register of Historic Places as a contributing building in the Camino del Monte Sol Historic District.

A biography was published in 1939. A 1950 edition of The Land of Little Rain and a 1977 edition of Taos Pueblo each included photographs by Ansel Adams. A teleplay of The Land of Little Rain was written by Doris Baizley and presented on American Playhouse in 1989; it starred Helen Hunt.

== Selected works ==
- One Hundred Miles on Horseback (1887, 1963) (first published essay 1887, re-published posthumously). 5176720
- The Land of Little Rain (1903), an account of the California Desert. 1512203

- full-text edition (Internet Archive)
- The Land of Little Rain at the Library of Congress (scanned images and text)

- The Basket Woman (1904), a book of Indian myths and fanciful tales for children. 2555698
- Isidro (book) (1905), a romance of Mission days. 3717385
- The Flock (1906), an account of the shepherd industry of California. 2555575
- Santa Lucia (1908), a novel. 1512269
- Austin, Mary (August 28, 1909). "Agua Dulce". Harper's Weekly. pp. 22–23 – via Santa Clarita Valley TV.
- Lost Borders, the people of the desert (1909). 814150
- The Arrow Maker – A Drama in Three Acts (1911). 4451334
- A Woman of Genius (1912). 8017340
- Fire: a drama in three acts (1914)
- The Man Jesus (1915) Republished in 1925 as A Small Town Man. 7096156
- The Ford (1917). 45843360
- The Trail Book (1918). 986472
- ''The Young Woman Citizen (1918). 2065042
- Outland (1919). 9156104
- No. 26 Jayne Street (1920). 10214415
- The American Rhythm (1923). 1511998
- The Land of Journeys' Ending (1924). 1079532
- Everyman's Genius (1925). 1512126
- Cactus Thorn (1927, 1988) (written ca. 1927, the novella was published posthumously). 17767275
- Lands of the Sun (1927). 1260910
- Taos Pueblo (1930). 3244279
- Experiences Facing Death (1931). 1196907
- Starry Adventure (1931). 985871
- Earth Horizon (1932), autobiography. 283674
- Non-English Writings II: Aboriginal The Cambridge History of American Literature Volume III Chapter XXXII pp. 610–634 (1933)
- Can Prayer Be Answered? (1934). 1512050
- One-Smoke Stories (1934). 3740559

== Poetry (incomplete list) ==
- Rathers
- Prairie-Dog Town
- Signs Of Spring
- A Feller I Know

"His name it is Pedro-Pablo-Ignacio-Juan-Francesco Garcia y Gabaldon, But the fellers call him Pete;"

- San Francisco
- Caller of the Buffalo
- The Lighthouse And The Whistle-Buoy
