= The Land of Little Rain =

Book written by Mary Hunter Austin

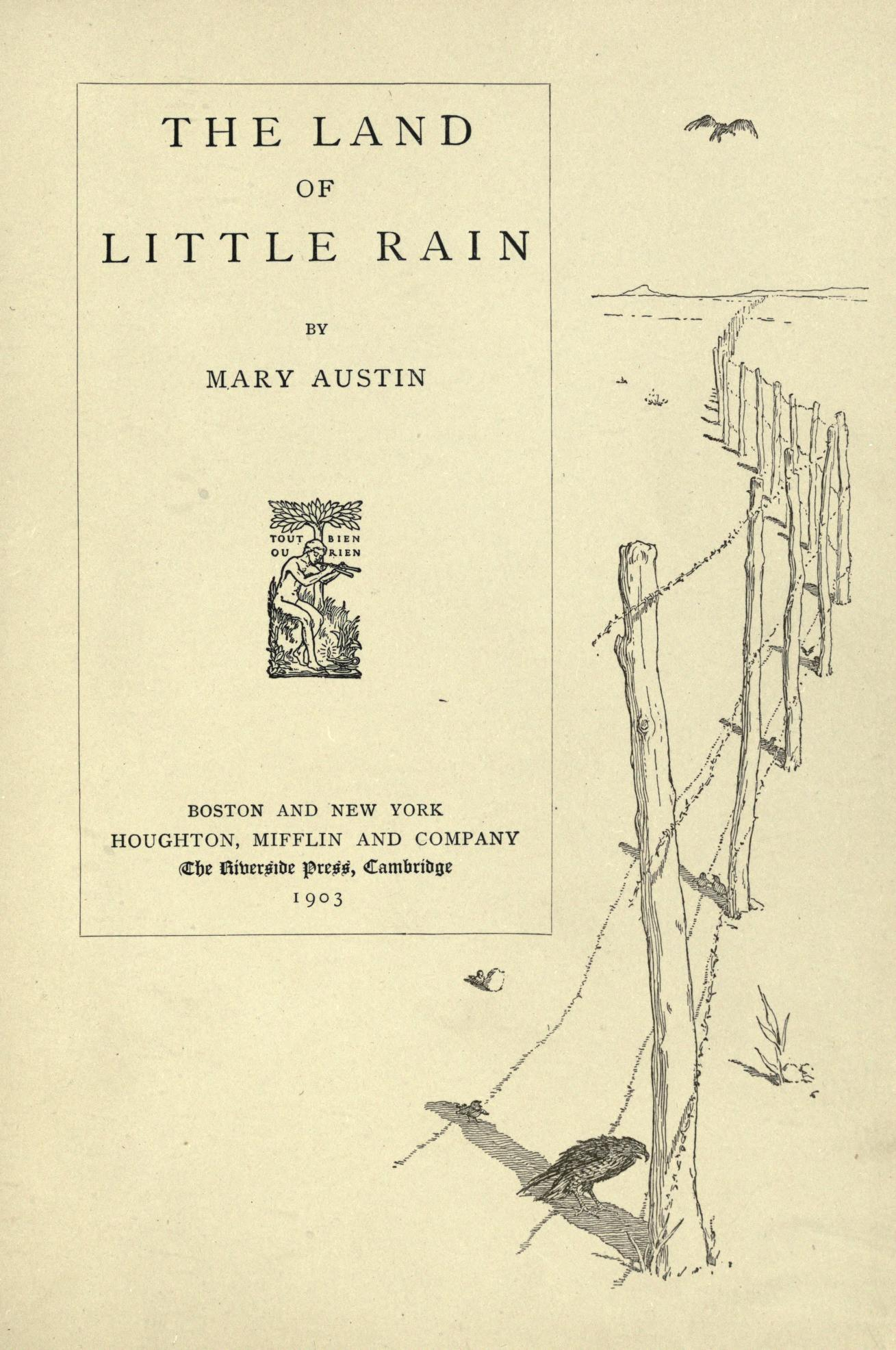
- Title page, 1903
- Author: Mary Hunter Austin
- Language: English
- Genre: Nature writing
- Publisher: Houghton Mifflin
- Publication date: 1903
- Publication place: United States
- Media type: Print (Paperback)
- ISBN: 0-14-024919-2 (modern)

The Land of Little Rain is a book written by American writer Mary Hunter Austin. First published in 1903, it contains a series of interrelated lyrical essays about the inhabitants, both human and otherwise, and the arid landscape of the Owens Valley and the Mojave Desert of California. It is number two on the Zamorano Eighty list of significant early Californiana.

== Publication history ==
The Land of Little Rain has been published six times. The first publication was in 1903 by Houghton Mifflin. Subsequent publications include a 1950 abridged version with photographs by Ansel Adams (also by Houghton Mifflin), a 1974 illustrated version by E. Boyd Smith published by University of New Mexico Press, a 1988 edition with an introduction by Edward Abbey published as part of the Penguin Nature Library by Penguin Books, and a 1997 edition published with an introduction by Terry Tempest Williams, also published by Penguin Books, and a 2014 edition with photography by Mojave Desert photographer Walter Feller, publisher by Counterpoint Press. In 2019, Silver Hollow Audio published the first audiobook edition, narrated by Ellen Parker.

== Plot summary ==
The Land of Little Rain is a collection of short stories and essays detailing the landscape and inhabitants of the American Southwest. A message of environmental conservation and a philosophy of cultural and sociopolitical regionalism loosely links the stories together.

"The Land of Little Rain"

The opening essay describes the "Country of Lost Borders," an area of land between Death Valley and the High Sierras. The image created of the land at the beginning of the story is one of almost unbearable heat and dryness, punctuated by violent storms. Despite the description of how inhospitable the landscape is, at the end Austin proposes that the costs the land imposes upon a man are worth it because it provides man with peace of mind and body that cannot be achieved any other way.

"Water Trails of the Ceriso"

The section's title refers to the trails made by wild animals moving towards sources of water across the landscape of an area known as the Ceriso. The Ceriso is not defined in the text, but in "The Last Antelope," Austin says that it "rises steeply from the tilted mesa overlooked by Black Mountain, darkly red as the red cattle that graze among the honey colored hills," and that it is "not properly mesa nor valley, but a long healed crater miles wide, rimmed about with the jagged edge of the old cone." The essay provides descriptions of the many animals that travel along the trails, including coyotes, rabbits, and quails. Their ability to find water where there seems to be none is extolled by Austin, a skill which she believes no human is able to match.

"The Scavengers"

This essay describes the various animals that live in the desert that feed upon carrion—most notably, the buzzards and the carrion crows. This scavenging is portrayed as a natural part of the desert, with a multitude of the scavengers working together to find food. The end of the story criticizes the actions of man with regard to the desert. The unnatural trash he leaves cannot be used by the scavengers in the story, and as such serves as a stark contrast to the desert's natural processes for recycling waste.

"The Pocket Hunter"

A pocket hunter is a type of miner who hunts for pockets of ore deposits. In the story, the pocket hunter described by Mary Austin lives off of the land with minimal interactions with the civilized world. This harmony with nature, Austin argues, is essential to the pocket hunter's simple happiness. Despite Austin's muted praise, the pocket hunter wants to strike it rich in order to move to Europe and mingle with the landed elite, a goal he accomplishes. However, by the end of the story, the pocket hunter returns to the desert since it is his "destiny".

"Shoshone Land"

"Shoshone Land" narrates the experiences of Winnenap', an American Indian medicine man originally from Shoshone Land who was captured by the Paiute tribe. The story initially revolves around Winnenap', but quickly changes to a detailed description of the environment and wildlife of Shoshone Land to form an intimate tie between Winnenap' and the land he formerly inhabited.

"Jimville—a Bret Harte Town"

In the beginning of the section, Jimville is touted as a better source of inspiration for Bret Harte than he found during his own travels. Jimville's inhabitants are likened to the fictional characters that were present in some of Harte's short stories. Austin portrays Jimville as a small town set in a harsh environment and inhabited by simple yet endearing toughs. Although the inhabitants endure many hardships, Austin claims that there is an almost unexplainable pull which keeps them in town and encourages new travelers to stay.

"My Neighbor's Field"

The story is about a plot of land which changes hands many times—Austin characterizes this plot of land as an ideal field. She criticizes the owners of the field, the Indians and shepherds, because their habits and lifestyle scar the land. At the end of the episode, it is revealed that the field is destined to develop into an urban area. Austin claims that while the field may at that point serve a greater human use, it will not be better for the land and all life.

"The Mesa Trail"

This section describes one of the trails that runs through the American Southwest. It contains several passages detailing the damage human activity has done to the land. She criticizes the "unsightly scars" left by the Paiute Indians in the form of abandoned campoodies and the damaged plant life left by domesticated animals such as sheep.

"The Basket Maker"

This story follows the life of Seyavi, a Paiute Indian who loses her mate, lives alone with her child, and sells baskets she weaves in order to survive. Austin claims that the Paiutes make the land itself their home, with the natural ridges of mountains as walls and the wild almond bloom as their furnishings. It is because of this that Austin argues that the Paiutes will always be homesick when in homes built by man, as man cannot replicate nature's walls and furnishings.

"The Streets of the Mountains"

This essay consists of long description of mountains and their respective trails. The section characterizes the beauty of the mountains and their inhabitants. The story also contains critiques people who dwell in man-made houses. The comfort provided by such houses, Austin argues, results in people not being able to truly understand the beauty and divinity of the mountains.

"Water Borders"

The essay revolves around the streams and lakes that can be found in the mountains, generally formed from the melting snow higher in the mountains. The particular mountain in the story is Oppapago, a mountain within the Sierras in a forest reserve. Austin contrasts the mountain landscape to a meadow outside a forest reserve, which lacks color and beauty because it is damaged by the grazing of sheep.

"Other Water Borders"

"Other Water Borders" is centered more on the plants affected by the water from the mountains, both wild and cultivated. The story begins with a depiction of a squabble between several locals over an irrigation ditch filled by water from the mountains. This is followed by a series of descriptions of the variety of plants that the irrigation ditch allows to thrive. Found within these depictions of plant life is Austin's lament of the complexities of civilization. Austin implies that with the advent of cities and manufactured objects people have lost an innate ability to know what natural remedies may be beneficial or detrimental to one's health.

"Nurslings of the Sky"

The "nurslings of the sky" are storms, formed in the hills and given almost human characteristics by Austin. The beginning of the story contains an account of the destruction of a town by floods and snow. The blame for the events is not placed on nature, but rather the people whose poorly placed town was destroyed. The story continues with descriptions of storms and their effects upon the wildlife of the area, pausing to explain how the land teaches people things. The story uses the example of a group of Native Americans who learn the use of smoke signals by observing the dust pillars formed by desert winds at the edges of mesas. The end of the story expresses Austin's discontent at how people have dealt with the weather by determining the best seasons to plant crops rather than by musing about the "eternal meanings of the skies".

"The Little Town of the Grape Vines"

"The Little Town of Grape Vines," or El Pueblo de Las Uvas, tells a story of a simple people living in peace with their environment. With houses made of mud, homemade wine, and gardens to provide the fruits, vegetables, and herbs, the townspeople live a simple life without the complex notions of wealth and class that Austin feels have corrupted much of society. Austin describes the lives of the people living in the town, lives which consist of little more than planting, harvesting, eating, making music, raising children, and dancing. The end of the story is a call back to the simple life exemplified in "The Little Town of the Grape Vines," criticizing those people who are overly obsessed with their own perceived importance in a world where their actions truly matter little.

== Style ==
The Land of Little Rain is characterized as both "local color" and non-fiction, scientific writing. It was written for an urban American audience unfamiliar with life in the Mojave Desert. The book attempts to engage the reader by including direct, second person along with first and third person point of views. Common stereotypical images and ideas about the desert are presented and contrasted to the narrator's past experiences. Specific and intimate experiences with nature in the desert are reproduced in the present tense for the reader's benefit.

The language is elevated and formal but made more conversational with informal colloquial language and jargon of the Southwest. The long and involved sentences often link abstractions to concrete images and description of the desert. The descriptions are subjective and characterized by laudatory, critical, or satiric language. They are further colored by abundant use of metaphors, similes, and hyperbole.

The book is divided into fourteen chapters consisting of short stories and essays on nature. The progression from chapter to chapter is not readily apparent. The first four chapters outline the desert territory and follow the course of the streams and their associated wildlife. The next five chapters describe specific communities of people within the desert, all of which are connected tangentially by the water trails. The civilized and primitive communities are criticized or glorified, respectively. In the central chapter, "Jimville—A Bret Harte Town", local color fiction is mocked as a superficial and distorted representation of mining towns. The final chapters follow the course of the streams and their associated wildlife backwards into the mountains, whereas the last chapter ends in an unspecified and ideal community within the desert.

== Themes ==
Aside from presenting a detailed account of the life and land of the Mojave Desert, each story and essay includes at least one of three themes: the supremacy and divinity of nature, the negative consequences of the disconnect between humans and nature, and the positive consequences of the harmony between humans and nature. Most chapters end with a direct moralizing paragraph emphasizing the theme, but several are less obvious and use allegories to illustrate the argument.

As the central character in the book, nature is personified and deified. It is assigned agency—feelings and intentions—and autonomy from humans. Compared to descriptions of humans, the hyperbolic descriptions of nature are dramatic and theatrical. All that is spiritual, supernatural, and divine is reflected or contained in it. Accordingly, nature is supreme and has higher purposes independent of humans. The spiritual truths and divine mysteries manifested and reflected in nature supersede any human equivalent.

Civilized humans are described in disparaging, condescending, or satiric ways. Their civilization does not better the world, but only disrupts the more divine processes and purposes of nature. Moreover, humans lose touch with their own instinctual knowledge, spirituality, and true purpose because of the disconnect with nature.

Primitive humans, or humans closer to nature and farther from the artifice of civilization, are glorified and idealized. The American Indians and the white people who commune with nature are described as genuine, dignified, virtuous, and holy. They accept their subordinate position to nature and the divine in the universe. As such, these people create communal towns that have cultural harmony and closeness to God and are free from crime and class distinctions.

The three themes culminate in the final chapter detailing the ideal earthy town created by primitive people. The reader is asked to abandon his or her modern life and live close to nature in order to experience peace, harmony, and divinity in this town that may not exist, suggesting that this renewed connection to nature will in fact come primarily via literature and the intellect.

== Politics ==
Austin does not make explicit political statements in The Land of Little Rain. With her voice marginalized by the male-dominated nature movement at the time, Austin's politics work instead through the aesthetics of representation; The Land of Little Rain is itself a critique of patriarchal conventions of nature writing. It speaks to what Heike Schafer calls an "aesthetic political agenda". Austin's vivid descriptions of the land in the novel are intended to suggest a sort of "regionalized utopia" that requires an intimate understanding of the land. Austin feels that in order to achieve social harmony, humanity has to work with nature, not against it. The stories in The Land of Little Rain feature the deleterious influences of man on nature, including the wasting of pastures by grazing domesticated herds and the ceaseless mining of resources, which destroy the land, though not irreparably. This suggests that just as the land of the Southwest needs to be rejuvenated, the cultures of the Southwest region, inherently tied to the land, need a cultural regeneration.

Austin's Southwest-centric literature sets her firmly within the context of contemporary regionalist writers. Though less politically direct than some of her other essays and short stories, the chapters of The Land of Little Rain are meant to convey a sense of the necessity of using the land properly. For example, in "The Water Trails of the Ceriso," Austin details the way in which the various desert animals cooperate to share the watering hole and guide each other with their trails. Even the hunters forsake their predation to allow the hunted to quench their thirst at the watering hole so that both may continue to survive. These animals must work within the limitations of the land, allowing their trails to be followed and their prey to have a haven, in order for their entire ecosystem to function and survive.

While not explicitly part of the nature fakers controversy of the early 20th century, Austin's work reflects a clear opposition to writers like Ernest Thompson Seton and Charles G. D. Roberts. The Land of Little Rain is written in highly descriptive, but very dry prose that contains little in the way of traditional plot. Austin saw her position as one of observation, not sentimentalization. Her work contrasted with contemporary fictionalized accounts of nature—stories about the lives of animals that were highly disingenuous, enamoring children with fantasies about the natural world. Austin used her popularity to sell people on the merits of the sort of "true" nature writing found in The Land of Little Rain.

== Dramatic adaptations ==
The Land of Little Rain was adapted as an episode of the TV series American Playhouse in 1989. The adaptation features Helen Hunt in the role of Mary Austin.
