= Tuzlaite =

General
- Category: Borates
- Formula: NaCaB_{5}O_{8}(OH)_{2} · 3H_{2}O
- IMA symbol: Tuz
- Strunz classification: 6.EC.25
- Crystal system: Monoclinic
- Crystal class: 2/m - Prismatic
- Space group: P21/c
- Unit cell: a = 6.506(1) b = 13.280(3) c = 11.462(3) β = 92.97(2)◦ Z=4

Identification
- Color: Colorless to White
- Crystal habit: Prismatic crystals, elongated along [001]
- Cleavage: On {001}, perfect
- Mohs scale hardness: 2 - 3
- Luster: Silky to pearly
- Streak: White
- Density: 2.23 g/cm
- Optical properties: Biaxial Positive
- Ultraviolet fluorescence: None

Tuzlaite is a borate mineral, associated with halides, named after the Tuzla salt mines in Bosnia and Hercegovina. A multitude of rare evaporate minerals have been discovered there, it being the only major evaporate deposit in the Balkans. This mineral has been approved as tuzlaite by the International Commission on New Minerals and Mineral Names.

== Occurrence ==
Tuzlaite is found alongside several rare evaporates such as northupite, searlesite, and bradleyite. Between the layers of salt, there are approximately 50m thick layers of grey to black dolomitic marls that occasionally get cut by white veinlets composed of the mineral tuzlaite. These veinlets can be surrounded by a coronitic halite phase that can be dissolved off with H_{2}O, leaving us with colorless to white crystals of tuzlaite up to 0.5mm in length. Most of these crystals can be intergrown, but some are suitable for X-ray single-crystal structure analysis.

== Physical and Optical Properties ==
Tuzlaite ranges from white to colorless with a perfect cleavage parallel to {001}. The hardness of the mineral is within the range of 2 to 3 on the Mohs Hardness scale. The lustre of Tuzlaite is silky to pearly and is reliant on its growing conditions and the size of the crystal with no reaction to short-wave and long-wave UV light. Tuzalite decomposes in hydrochloric acid leaving a transparent solution with no residue, but does not react with H_{2}O.

Tuzlaite has refractive indices n_{x} = 1.532(2), n_{y} = 1.544(2), and n_{z} = 1.561(2). The optical orientation is Y = b, Z:a = 14° (in acute angle β). It is optically positive with Δ = 0.029(l), measured with a compensator and calculated from refractive indices. The optic axial angle was measured as 2V_{z} = 82(1)°; 2V_{z} = 80.9° was calculated from refractive indices. Indicatrix dispersion wasn't observed.

== Chemistry ==
	(1)	(2)
B_{2}O_{3}	52.19	52.24
Al_{2}O_{3}	0.26	-
CaO	14.64	16.83
SrO	0.21	-
Na_{2}O	10.25	9.30
H_{2}O	21.66	21.63
Total	99.21	100.00

(1) Tuzla mine in Bosnia-Herzegovina; average of six analyses by flamephotometry, TGA, and crystal-structure analysis; corresponds to Na_{1.00}(Ca_{0.87}Na_{0.10}Sr_{0.01})_{Σ=0.98}B_{4.98}Al_{0.02} O_{7.92}(OH)_{2} • 3H_{2}O.

(2) NaCaB_{5}O_{8}(OH)_{2} • 3H_{2}O.

== Crystal Structure ==
All atoms in the structure for tuzlaite were refined and located. Tuzlaite has a pentaborate sheet structure with layers parallel to (001). These sheets are connected by Ca and Na coordinated with three H_{2}O molecules, where Ca is eightfold coordinated by six borate O atoms and two H_{2}O molecules. Na is sevenfold coordinated by four borate O atoms and three H_{2}O molecules. Na and Ca polyhedra form continuous chains with a Ca-Ca-Na-Na-Ca-Ca sequence. Face sharing occurs between Ca and Na polyhedra. Na and Ca polyhedral chains penetrate the ten-membered borate rings excentrically; thus the remaining space is filled by H_{2}O molecules, which are linked by H bonds to the borate sheet.

== See More ==
List of Minerals
