= Northupite =

Uncommon evaporite mineral

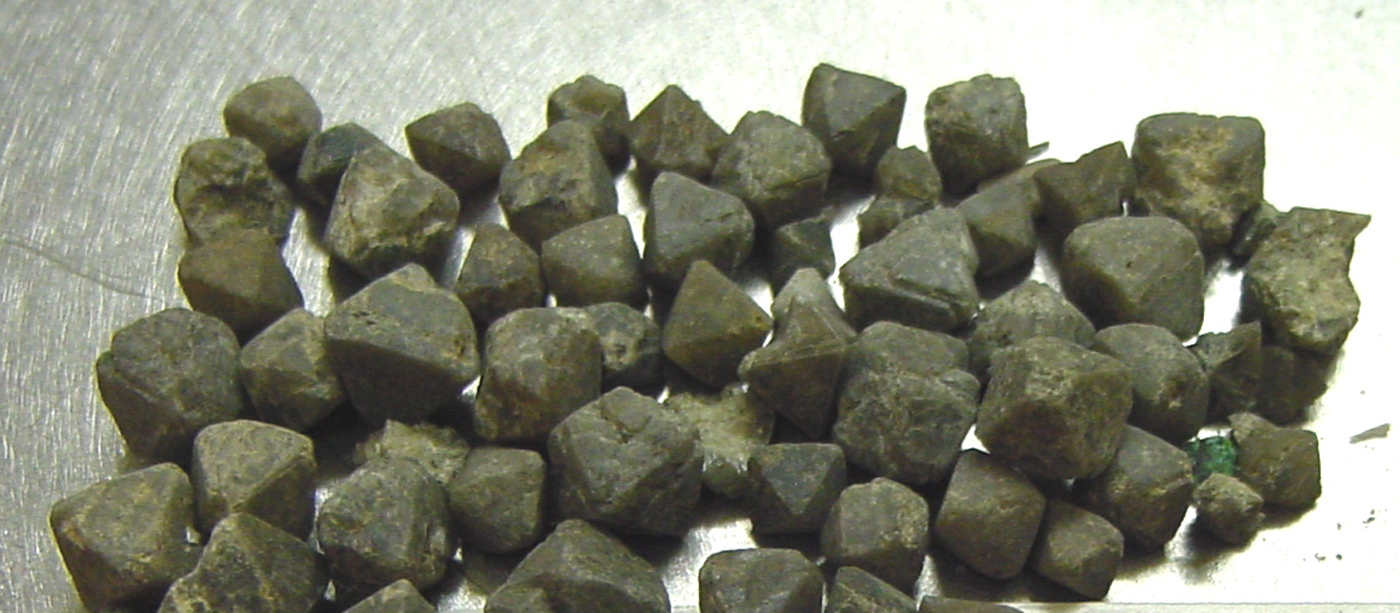
- Northupite octahedra

General
- Category: Carbonate minerals
- Formula: Na_{3}Mg(CO_{3})_{2}Cl
- IMA symbol: Nup
- Strunz classification: 5.BF.05
- Crystal system: Isometric
- Crystal class: Diploidal (m3̅); H-M symbol: (2/m3̅)
- Space group: Fd3
- Unit cell: a = 13.98 Å; Z = 16

Identification
- Colour: Colourless, pale yellow, grey, brown; colourless in transmitted light
- Crystal habit: Octahedral crystals; globular, massive
- Fracture: Conchoidal
- Tenacity: Brittle
- Mohs scale hardness: 3 1/2 – 4
- Lustre: Vitreous
- Diaphaneity: Transparent
- Specific gravity: 2.380–2.407
- Optical properties: Isotropic
- Refractive index: n = 1.5144 (to 1.550 with iron substitution)
- Solubility: Readily soluble in dilute acids with effervescence. Decomposed by hot water with the separation of magnesium carbonate.

Northupite is an uncommon evaporite mineral, with the chemical formula Na_{3}Mg(CO_{3})_{2}Cl. It occurs as colourless to dark grey or brown octahedral crystals and as globular masses. In synthetic material it forms a series with tychite (Na_{6}Mg_{2}(CO_{3})_{4}SO_{4}).

It was discovered in 1895 at Searles Lake, San Bernardino County, California by C. H. Northup (born 1861) from San Jose, California, for whom Northupite is named.

It occurs associated with tychite, pirssonite at Searles Lake and with shortite, trona, pirssonite, gaylussite, labuntsovite, searlesite, norsethite, loughlinite, pyrite and quartz in the Green River Formation of Wyoming.
