= Hanksite =

Sulfate mineral

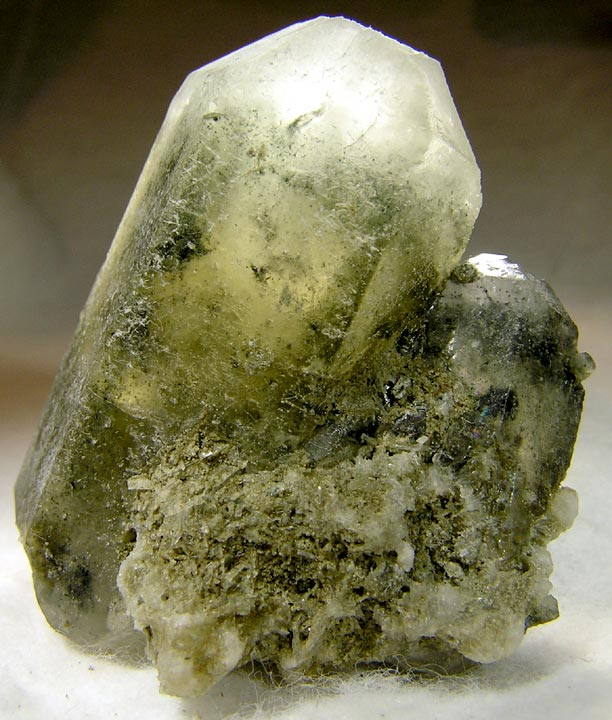
- Hanksite crystal from Searles Lake

General
- Category: Sulfate minerals, sulfate carbonate
- Formula: Na_{22}K(SO_{4})_{9}(CO_{3})_{2}Cl
- IMA symbol: Hks
- Strunz classification: 7.BD.30
- Crystal system: Hexagonal
- Crystal class: Dipyramidal (6/m); H–M symbol: (6/m)
- Space group: P6_{3}/m
- Unit cell: a = 10.465(21) Å c = 21.191(43) Å; Z = 2

Identification
- Color: Colorless to pale yellow, may be grayish green due to clay inclusions
- Crystal habit: Occurs as short prismatic to tabular hexagonal crystals
- Cleavage: Good on {0001}
- Fracture: Uneven
- Tenacity: Brittle
- Mohs scale hardness: 3–3.5
- Luster: Vitreous to dull
- Streak: White
- Diaphaneity: Transparent to translucent
- Specific gravity: 2.562
- Optical properties: Uniaxial (−)
- Refractive index: n_{ω} = 1.481, n_{ε} = 1.461
- Birefringence: δ = 0.020
- Ultraviolet fluorescence: Pale yellow under LW UV
- Solubility: Readily soluble in water

Hanksite is a sulfate mineral, distinguished as one of only a handful that contain both carbonate and sulfate ions (a sulfate carbonate). It has the chemical formula Na_{22}K(SO_{4})_{9}(CO_{3})_{2}Cl.

== Occurrence ==
It was first described in 1888 for an occurrence in Searles Lake, California, and named for American geologist Henry Garber Hanks. Hanksite is normally found in crystal form as evaporite deposits. Hanksite crystals are large but not complex in structure. It is often found in Searles Lake, Soda Lake, Mono Lake, and in Death Valley. At its deposits in San Bernardino County, California hanksite is commonly found beneath the surface embedded in mud or in drill cores (Palache et al., 1960). It is associated with halite, borax, trona, and aphthitalite at the Searles Lake locality. It is also associated with borax mining in the Soda Lake area.

== Physical characteristics ==
Hanksite can be colorless, white, gray, green, or yellow, and is transparent or translucent. The mineral's hardness is approximately 3 to 3.5. The specific gravity is approximately 2.5 (slightly below average). It is salty to the taste and sometimes glows pale yellow in ultraviolet light. Typical growth habits are hexagonal prisms or tabular with pyramidal terminations. The streak of Hanksite is white. It can contain inclusions of clay that the crystal formed around while developing.

== Similar minerals ==
- Borax
- Halite
- Nahcolite
- Tincalconite
- Trona

== Bibliography ==
- Palache, P.; Berman H.; Frondel, C. (1960). "Dana's System of Mineralogy, Volume II: Halides, Nitrates, Borates, Carbonates, Sulfates, Phosphates, Arsenates, Tungstates, Molybdates, Etc. (Seventh Edition)" John Wiley and Sons, Inc., New York, pp. 628-629.
