= Henry Garber Hanks =

American gold miner, mineralogist, and businessman from California

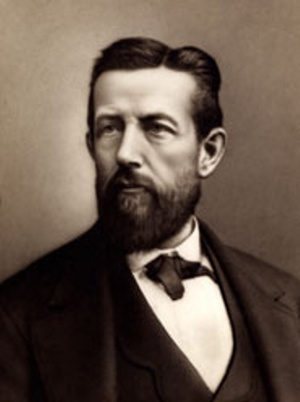
- Henry G. Hanks

1st State Mineralogist in California
- In office 1880 – 1886
- Succeeded by: William Irelan Jr.

Personal details
- Born: May 12, 1826 Cleveland, Ohio
- Died: June 19, 1907 (aged 81) Alameda County, California
- Spouse: Ellen Francis Barker
- Children: 5
- Occupation: Gold miner, mineralogist, businessman
- Known for: First State Mineralogist in California

Henry Garber Hanks (May 12, 1826 – June 19, 1907) was an American mineralogist. He was the first state mineralogist of California.

== Early life ==
Henry Garber Hanks was born in Cleveland, Ohio, on May 12, 1826. His father Jarvis Frary Hanks was a local portrait painter; his mother was Charlotte Garber Hanks.

== Career ==
Around the age of 16, Hanks left Ohio for Boston, taking work as a seaman. In 1842, his ship sailed to Calcutta in British India, where he worked and traveled for about a year. He then served as a seaman on another ship returning to New York. He then traveled around the continental United States while conducting scientific studies before returning to Cleveland to work as a house and sign painter. Around the age of 25, Hanks left Ohio to join the Gold Rush in California. Between 1852 and 1856, he worked as a miner and businessman around Sacramento. By 1860, he was mostly occupied with selling paint in San Francisco.

In 1866, Hanks established Pacific Chemical Works, an assaying company. Hanks was also a founding member of the Microscopical Society of San Francisco (founded 1872) and its first president.

He represented California as its mineral commissioner and the United States as its mineral superintendent at the 1878 Paris Exposition. Following the State Geological Society's reorganization as part of the State Mining Bureau on 16 April 1880, Henry was chosen by Governor Perkins on 15 May to head the new organization as California's first state mineralogist. Based in San Francisco, he was responsible for inspecting and classifying geological specimens submitted to the bureau, as well as providing studies, annual reports, and various special publications. Taking charge of the old geological society's collection and other property, he established a public museum and library. He served until 1886 at a salary of $3000 per year. He was responsible for the mineral exhibits of California and the United States at the 1884 New Orleans and 1893 Chicago World's Fairs.

== Personal life ==
In 1867, Hanks married Ellen Francis Barker. They had five children. One of his children Abbott joined Hanks's company as an assayer.

On June 19, 1907, Hanks died in Alameda County, California.

== Legacy ==
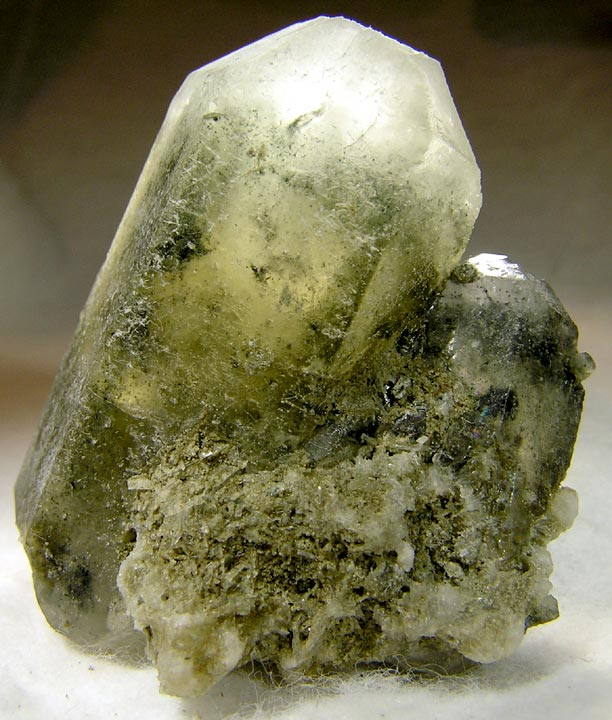
A doubly-terminated hexagonal crystal of hanksite

Henry G. Hanks was the namesake of hanksite, a sulfate mineral identified by William Earl Hidden based on a specimen from Searles Lake in California in 1885.

== Works ==
- "Borax Deposits on the Pacific Coast", The Overland Monthly, vol. XI, San Francisco: John H. Carmany & Co, July 1873, pp. 71–74.
- Catalogue: Private Collection of Henry G. Hanks, San Francisco, 1880.
- "Annual Report of the State Mineralogist, from June 1, 1880, to December 1, 1880", Report of the State Mineralogist, San Francisco: 1 v, 1880.
- Second Report of the State Mineralogist of California, from December 1, 1880, to October 1, 1882, Sacramento: California State Office, 1882.
- First Annual Catalogue of the State Museum of California..., Sacramento: California State Office, 1882.
- Third Annual Report of the State Mineralogist, vol. I & II, Sacramento: California State Office, 1883.
- Fourth Annual Report of the State Mineralogist for the Year Ending May 15, 1884, Sacramento: California State Office, 1884.
- Catalogue of the State Museum of California, vol. 2, Sacramento: California State Office, 1884.
- Catalogue of Books, Maps, Lithographs, Photographs, Etc. in the Library of the State Mining Bureau at San Francisco, Sacramento: California State Office, 1884.
- Fifth Annual Report of the State Mineralogist, for the Year Ending May 15, 1885, Sacramento: California State Office, 1885.
- Sixth Annual Report of the State Mineralogist, vol. I, Sacramento: California State Office, 1886.
- The Deep Lying Auriferous Gravels and Table Mountains of California, San Francisco: F.H. Abbott, 1901.
