= Searles Valley, California =

- Census-designated place
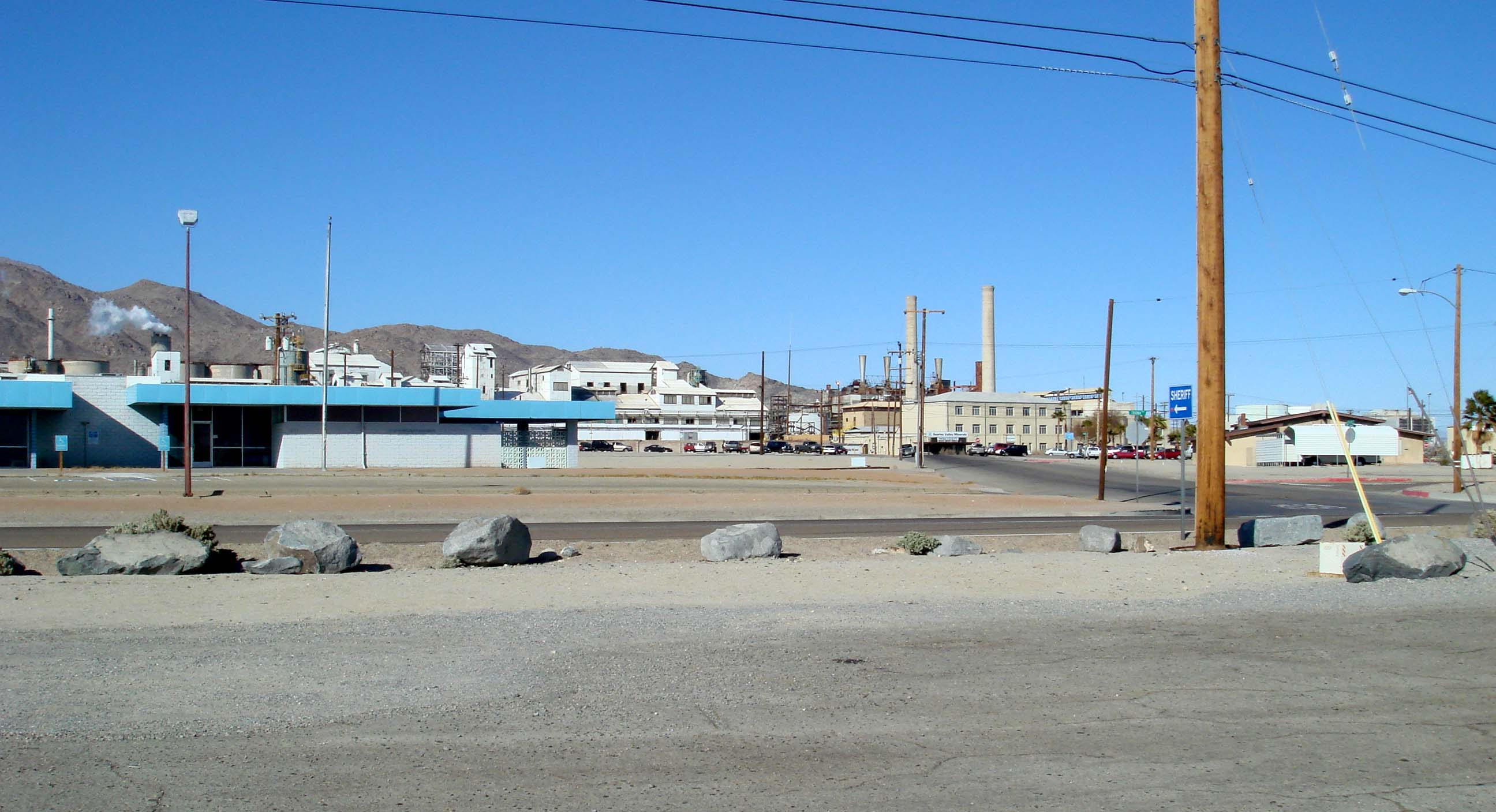
- Searles Valley soda ash plant dominates the community (2007)

- Location in San Bernardino County and the state of California

- Location in the United States
- Coordinates: 35°45′55″N 117°22′58″W
- Country: United States
- State: California
- County: San Bernardino

Area
  - Total: 10.497 sq mi (27.187 km^{2})
  - Land: 10.497 sq mi (27.187 km^{2})
  - Water: 0 sq mi (0 km^{2}) 0%

Population (2020)
  - Total: 1,565
  - Density: 149.1/sq mi (57.56/km^{2})
- Time zone: UTC-8 (PST)
  - Summer (DST): UTC-7 (PDT)
- ZIP code: 93562
- Area code: 760
- FIPS code: 06-70728
- GNIS feature ID: 2409296

Searles Valley is a census-designated place (CDP) in the Searles Valley of the Mojave Desert, in northwestern San Bernardino County, California, United States. As of the 2020 census, Searles Valley had a population of 1,565.

== Geography ==
Searles Valley includes the unincorporated communities of Argus, Pioneer Point, Searles Valley (town), and Trona. Searles Valley is located at 35°45′55″N 117°22′58″W (35.765181, -117.382803).

Searles Valley CDP is at the western edge of Searles Lake, a dry lakebed in the lowest part of the Searles Valley.

Searles Valley CDP is about 170 miles northeast of Los Angeles, on State Route 178. It is southwest of Death Valley and the Panamint Range. Ridgecrest and China Lake are to the west.

According to the United States Census Bureau, Searles Valley has a total area of 27.2 km^{2} (10.5 sq mi), all land. The population was 1,565 at the 2020 census. The ZIP code is 93562 and the area code 760.

== Natural history ==
The Searles Lake is an endorheic dry lake formed by the evaporation of lakes during the late Quaternary period. It contains rich deposits of chemicals, including borax and rock salt.

Searles Valley is known for its isolation and desolation, as well as the nearby Trona Pinnacles a few miles to the south. The Trona Pinnacles are an unusual landscape of more than 500 tufa spires, some as high as 140 feet, rising from the bed of the Searles Lake basin.

The name Trona is derived from the mineral trona, abundant in the lake. The local school plays on a dirt football field because the high level of salt kills grass.

=== 2019 earthquakes ===
In July 2019, Searles Valley was impacted by a series of earthquakes, the principal events (with magnitudes of 6.4, 5.4, and 7.1 M_{w}) occurring from 12 to 18 kilometers west on the Naval Air Weapons Station China Lake. The earthquake series started at 10:02 AM on July 4 with a Mw 4.0 earthquake 4 kilometers southwest of Searles Valley. At 10:33 AM a second and much stronger earthquake struck – a 6.4 magnitude quake 12 kilometers southwest of Searles Valley. The earthquake was felt throughout the area and Southern California, including Los Angeles, and in Nevada, including Las Vegas. The earthquake was 10.5 kilometers deep. Over 100 aftershocks impacted Searles Valley and nearby Ridgecrest, California. This second quake was followed by an even larger 7.1 magnitude quake, subsequently designated the main quake in the series, on July 5, 2019, at approximately 8:18 PM. The valley experienced a 3.9 magnitude quake on July 22, 2019.

== Government ==
In the state legislature Searles Valley is located in the 19th senatorial district, represented by Republican Rosilicie Ochoa Bogh, and in the 34th Assembly district, represented by Republican Tom Lackey.

== Demographics ==
Historical population
Census	Pop.	Note	%±
1970	3,828		—
1980	3,439		−10.2%
1990	2,740		−20.3%
2000	1,885		−31.2%
2010	1,739		−7.7%
2020	1,565		−10.0%
U.S. Decennial Census; 1850–1870 1880-1890; 1900 1910 1920; 1930 1940 1950; 1960 1970 1980; 1990 2000 2010

Searles Valley was first listed as an unincorporated place in the 1970 U.S. census; and then as a census designated place in the 1980 U.S. census.

=== 2020 census ===
As of the 2020 census, Searles Valley had a population of 1,565 and a population density of 149.1 inhabitants per square mile (57.6/km^{2}). 0.0% of residents lived in urban areas, while 100.0% lived in rural areas.

The age distribution was 24.9% under the age of 18, 7.3% aged 18 to 24, 22.7% aged 25 to 44, 27.3% aged 45 to 64, and 17.8% who were 65 years of age or older. The median age was 39.9 years. For every 100 females there were 101.7 males, and for every 100 females age 18 and over there were 99.5 males age 18 and over.

The whole population lived in households. There were 653 households, of which 27.6% had children under the age of 18 living in them. Of all households, 34.0% were married-couple households, 13.0% were cohabiting couple households, 23.7% were households with a male householder and no spouse or partner present, and 29.2% were households with a female householder and no spouse or partner present. About 32.3% of all households were made up of individuals and 13.2% had someone living alone who was 65 years of age or older. The average household size was 2.4. There were 374 families (57.3% of all households).

There were 890 housing units at an average density of 84.8 units per square mile (32.7 units/km^{2}); 26.6% were vacant and 653 (73.4%) were occupied. Of occupied units, 59.3% were owner-occupied and 40.7% were occupied by renters. The homeowner vacancy rate was 3.7% and the rental vacancy rate was 14.1%.

Racial composition as of the 2020 census
Race	Number	Percent
White	1,108	70.8%
Black or African American	88	5.6%
American Indian and Alaska Native	24	1.5%
Asian	17	1.1%
Native Hawaiian and Other Pacific Islander	5	0.3%
Some other race	148	9.5%
Two or more races	175	11.2%
Hispanic or Latino (of any race)	347	22.2%

=== Income and poverty ===
In 2023, the US Census Bureau estimated that the median household income was $65,625, and the per capita income was $28,057. About 14.9% of families and 18.1% of the population were below the poverty line.

=== 2010 census ===
The 2010 United States census reported that Searles Valley had a population of 1,739. The population density was 165.7 inhabitants per square mile (64.0/km^{2}). The racial makeup of Searles Valley was 1,405 (80.8%) White (72.3% Non-Hispanic White), 69 (4.0%) African American, 56 (3.2%) Native American, 16 (0.9%) Asian, 6 (0.3%) Pacific Islander, 83 (4.8%) from other races, and 104 (6.0%) from two or more races. Hispanic or Latino of any race were 293 persons (16.8%).

The Census reported that 1,739 people (100% of the population) lived in households, 0 (0%) lived in non-institutionalized group quarters, and 0 (0%) were institutionalized.

There were 722 households, out of which 215 (29.8%) had children under the age of 18 living in them, 309 (42.8%) were opposite-sex married couples living together, 92 (12.7%) had a female householder with no husband present, 52 (7.2%) had a male householder with no wife present. There were 48 (6.6%) unmarried opposite-sex partnerships, and 3 (0.4%) same-sex married couples or partnerships. 223 households (30.9%) were made up of individuals, and 80 (11.1%) had someone living alone who was 65 years of age or older. The average household size was 2.41. There were 453 families (62.7% of all households); the average family size was 3.01.

The population was spread out, with 436 people (25.1%) under the age of 18, 171 people (9.8%) aged 18 to 24, 342 people (19.7%) aged 25 to 44, 515 people (29.6%) aged 45 to 64, and 275 people (15.8%) who were 65 years of age or older. The median age was 40.7 years. For every 100 females, there were 104.1 males. For every 100 females age 18 and over, there were 101.4 males.

There were 961 housing units at an average density of 91.6 units per square mile (35.4 units/km^{2}), of which 439 (60.8%) were owner-occupied, and 283 (39.2%) were occupied by renters. The homeowner vacancy rate was 1.5%; the rental vacancy rate was 8.4%. 1,041 people (59.9% of the population) lived in owner-occupied housing units and 698 people (40.1%) lived in rental housing units.

According to the 2010 United States Census, Searles Valley had a median household income of $32,448, with 21.7% of the population living below the federal poverty line.

== See also ==
- Ballarat, California — ghost town
- Trona Pinnacles

== Gallery ==
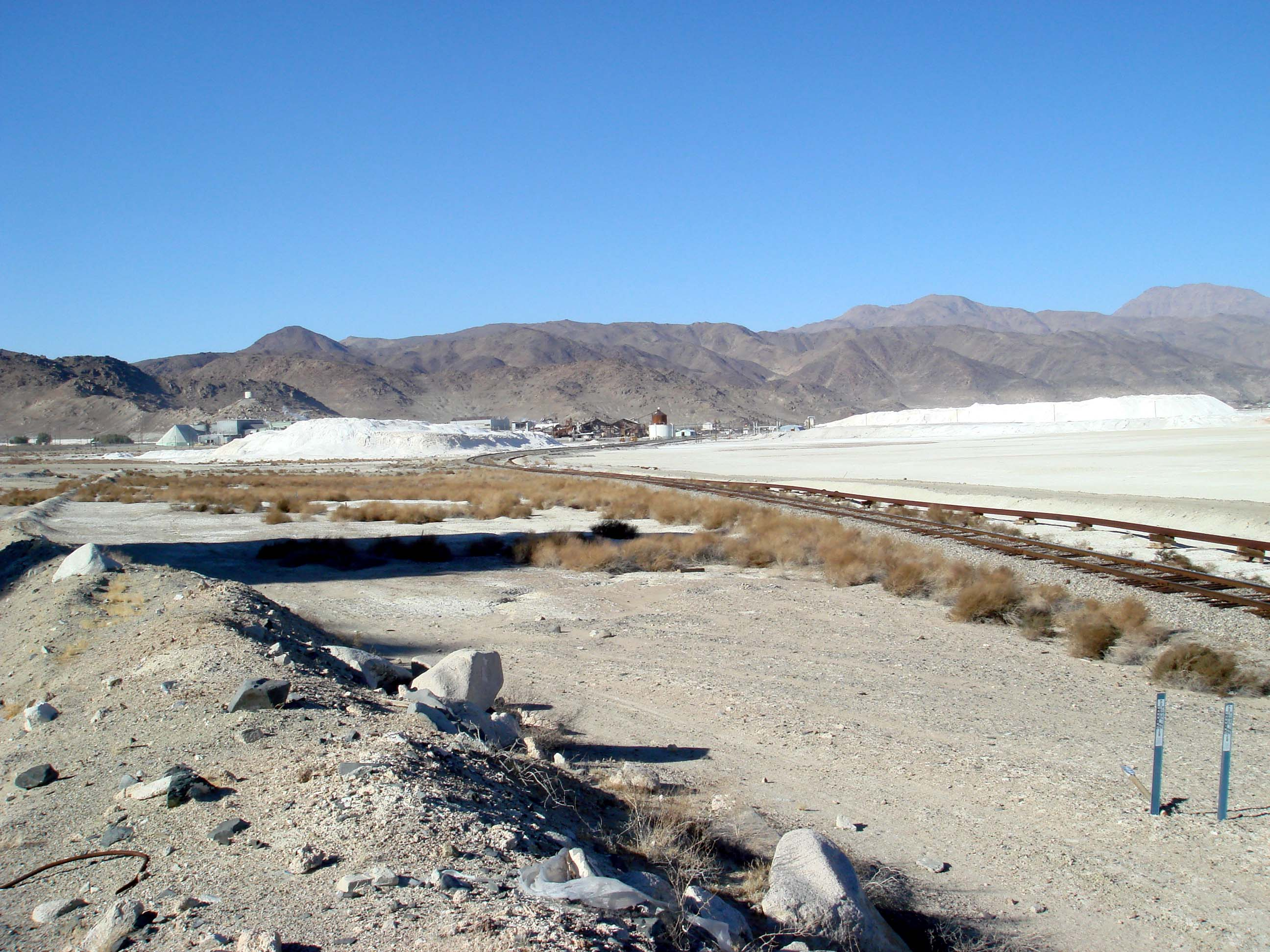
Piles of lime dust sit just south of Trona on the Trona Railway.

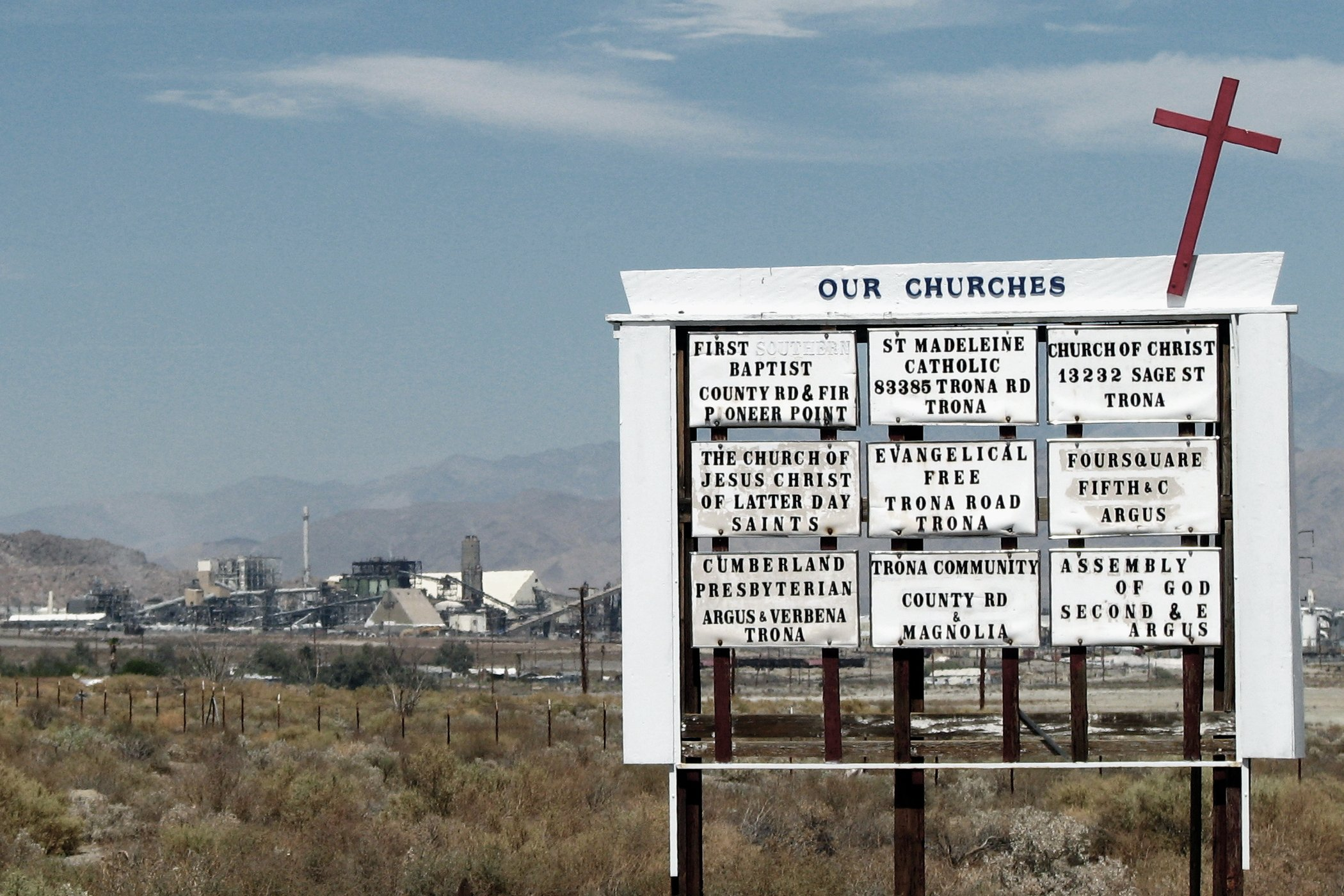
Entrance to Trona.

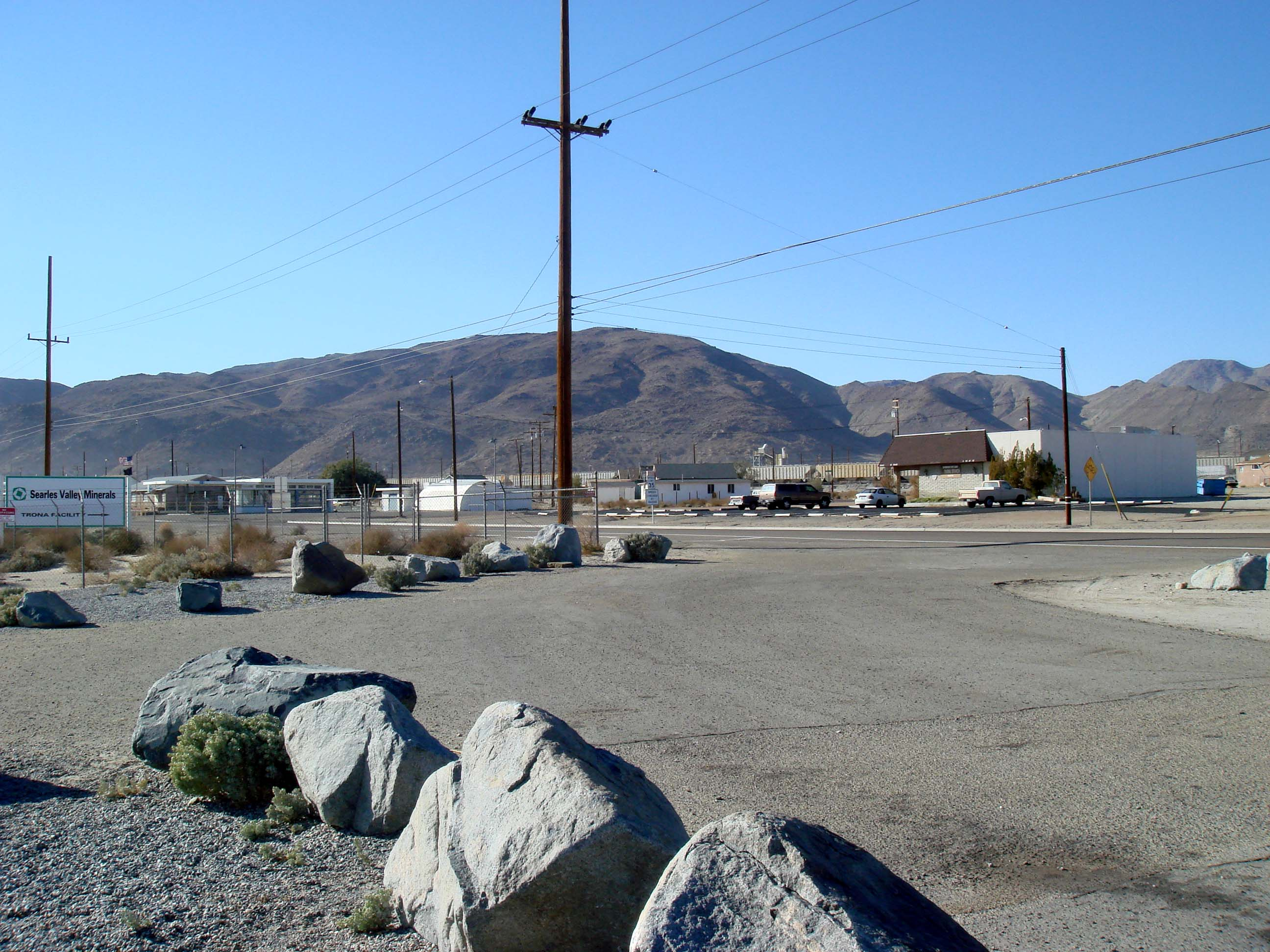
Searles Valley from the Searles Valley rest stop.

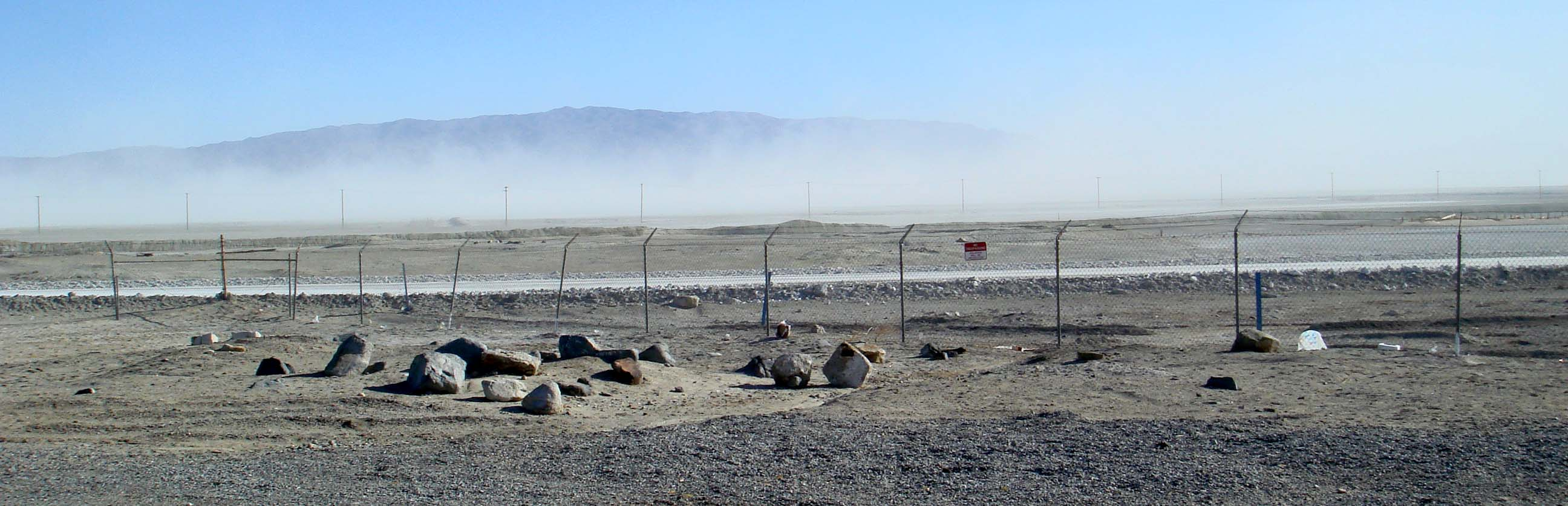
A dust storm forms over the dry Searles Lake bed, taken from the Searles Valley rest stop.

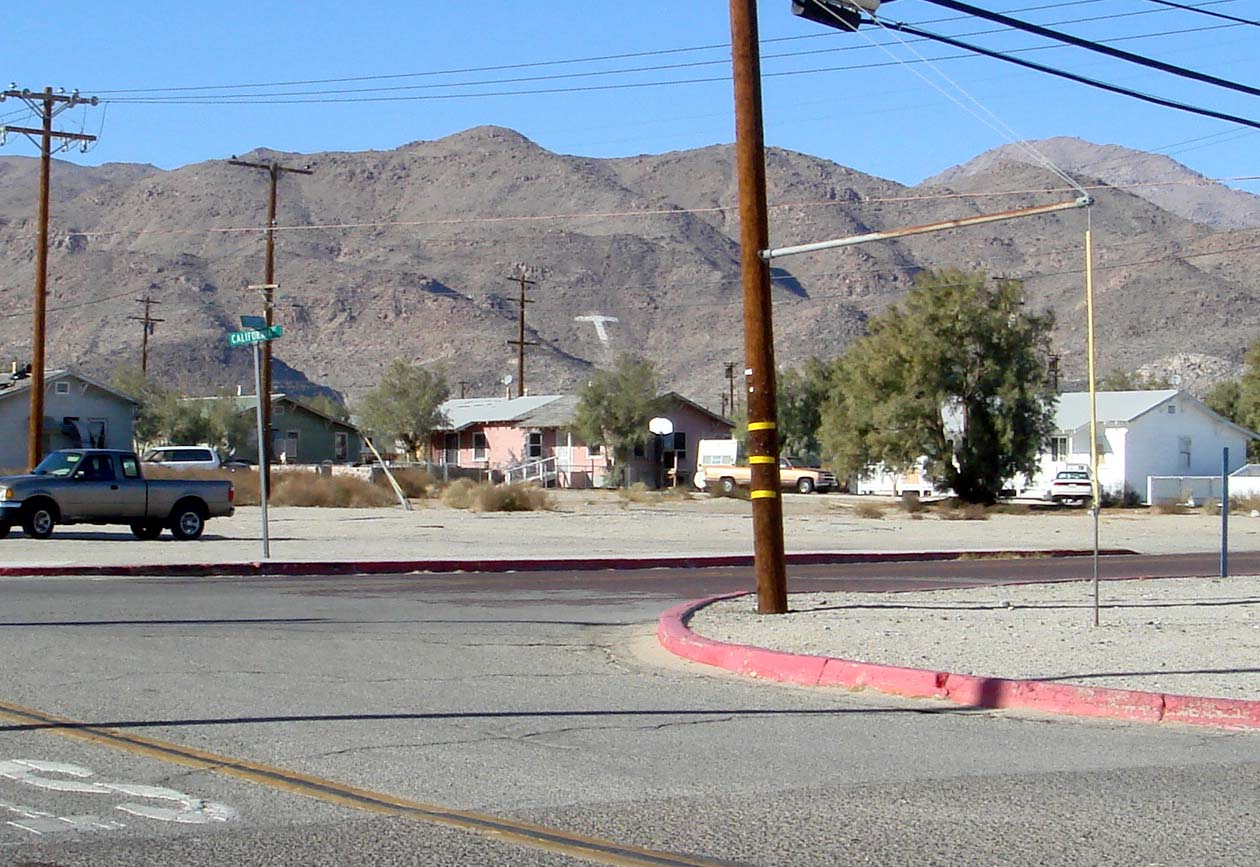
A Mountain Monogram "T" sits on the hills above Trona.
