= Pioneer Point, California =

Unincorporated community in California, United States

- Unincorporated community
- Location within California Location within the United States
- Coordinates: 35°47′09″N 117°21′48″W
- Country: United States
- State: California
- County: San Bernardino
- Elevation: 1,660 ft (510 m)
- Time zone: UTC-8 (Pacific (PST))
  - Summer (DST): UTC-7 (PDT)
- Area codes: 442/760
- GNIS feature ID: 252884

Pioneer Point is an unincorporated community in the Searles Valley of the Mojave Desert, in northern San Bernardino County, California.

Pioneer Point is 20 miles (32 km) northeast of Ridgecrest.

Searles Valley census-designated place

Pioneer Point and the communities of Argus, Trona, and Searles Valley (community) make up the Searles Valley census-designated place.

== See also ==
- Populated places in the Mojave Desert
