= V-Bor =

V-Bor is a commercially packaged form of borax pentahydrate (Na_{2}B_{4}O_{7}·5H_{2}O). It is produced by the Searles Valley Minerals company from minerals mined at Searles Lake. It has most of the same uses as borax. It is also used to neutralize skins/hides in leather tanning, corrects boron deficiency in plants, reduces the melting temperature in glass processes, is a fire retardant in cellulose insulation, and is used to make a bleaching agent for home laundry.
