= Searles Lake =

Lake in the state of California, United States

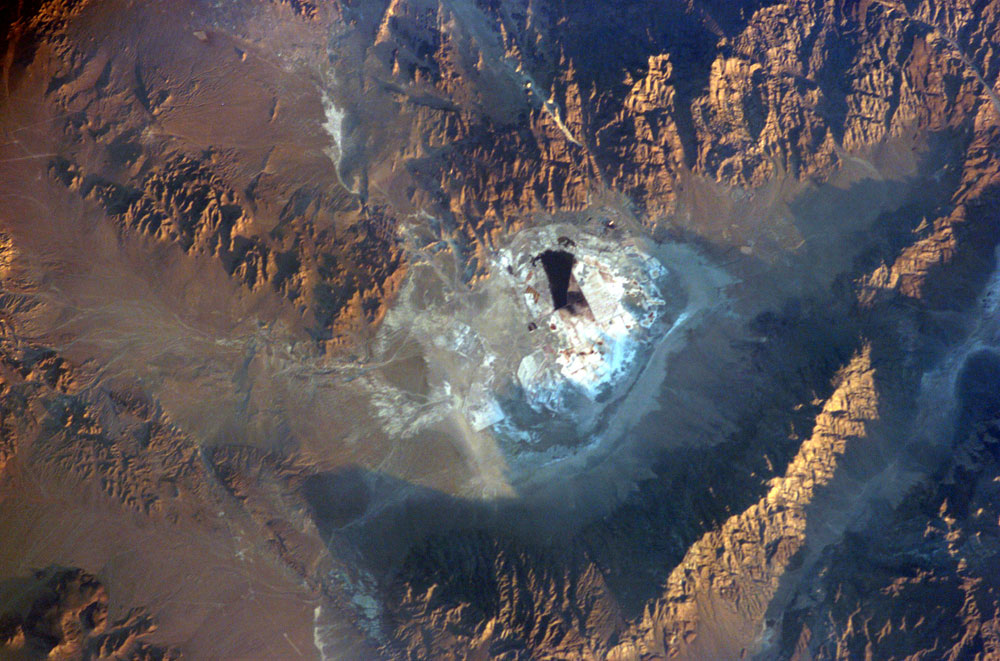
- Searles Lake playa bounded by the Argus and Slate Mountains

- Location within California Location within the United States
- Location: Searles Valley, Mojave Desert; San Bernardino County, California
- Coordinates: 35°42′31″N 117°19′15″W
- Type: Endorheic basin
- Primary outflows: Terminal (evaporation)
- Basin countries: United States
- Max. length: 19 km (12 mi)
- Max. width: 13 km (8.1 mi)
- Shore length^{1}: 50 km (31 mi)
- Surface elevation: 493 m (1,617 ft)
- Settlements: Trona, California
- References: U.S. Geological Survey Geographic Names Information System: Searles Lake
- ^{1} Shore length is not a well-defined measure.

Searles Lake is an endorheic dry lake in the Searles Valley of the Mojave Desert, in northwestern San Bernardino County, California. The lake in the past was also called Slate Range Lake and Borax Lake.

The mining community of Trona is on its western shore. The evaporite basin is approximately 19 km (12 mi) long and 13 km (8.1 mi) at its widest point, yielding 1.7 million tons annually of industrial minerals within the basin to the Searles Valley Minerals mining operations. Searles Lake is bounded by the Argus and Slate Mountains, and was named after John Wemple Searles.

== Geology ==
The stratigraphic record at Searles Lake shows that it once held brackish water as deep as 200 m (660 ft). Fluctuations in lake levels correspond to the advances and retreats of glaciers in the Sierra Nevada Range. Thirty major lake levels occurred during the last 150,000 years, represented by a sequence of salt and mud beds. The precipitation of minerals occurred during long periods of lake evaporation.

The lake is home to the Trona Pinnacles, a spectacular geologic tufa formation and a National Natural Landmark.

Searles Lake Borax discovery
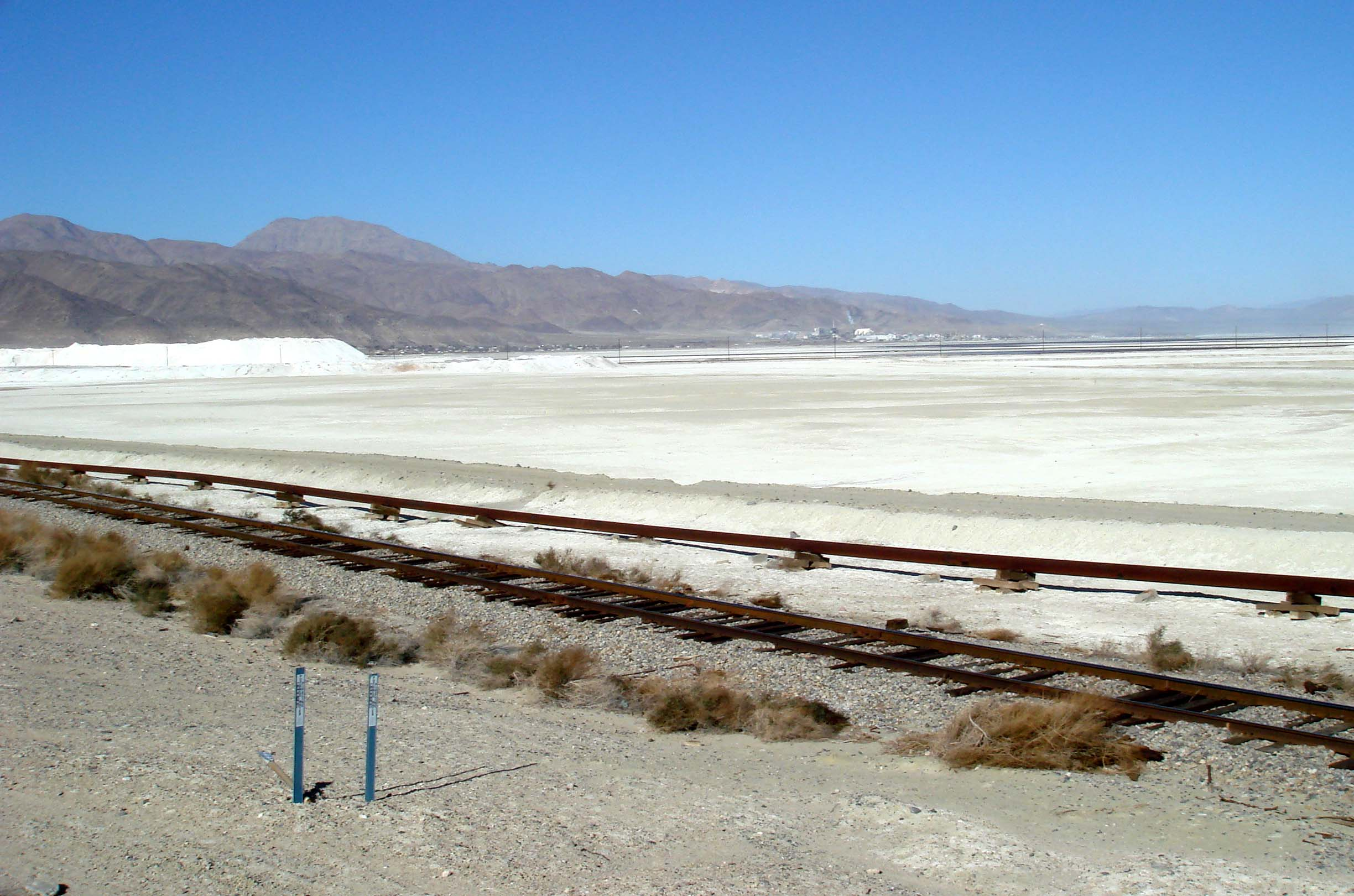
- Trona, California, abuts northwest of the dry Searles Lake bed.

- Location within California
- 35°45′28″N 117°22′38″W
- Location: Trona Rd at Center St., San Bernardino, California

California Historical Landmark
- Designated: August 16, 1962
- Reference no.: 774

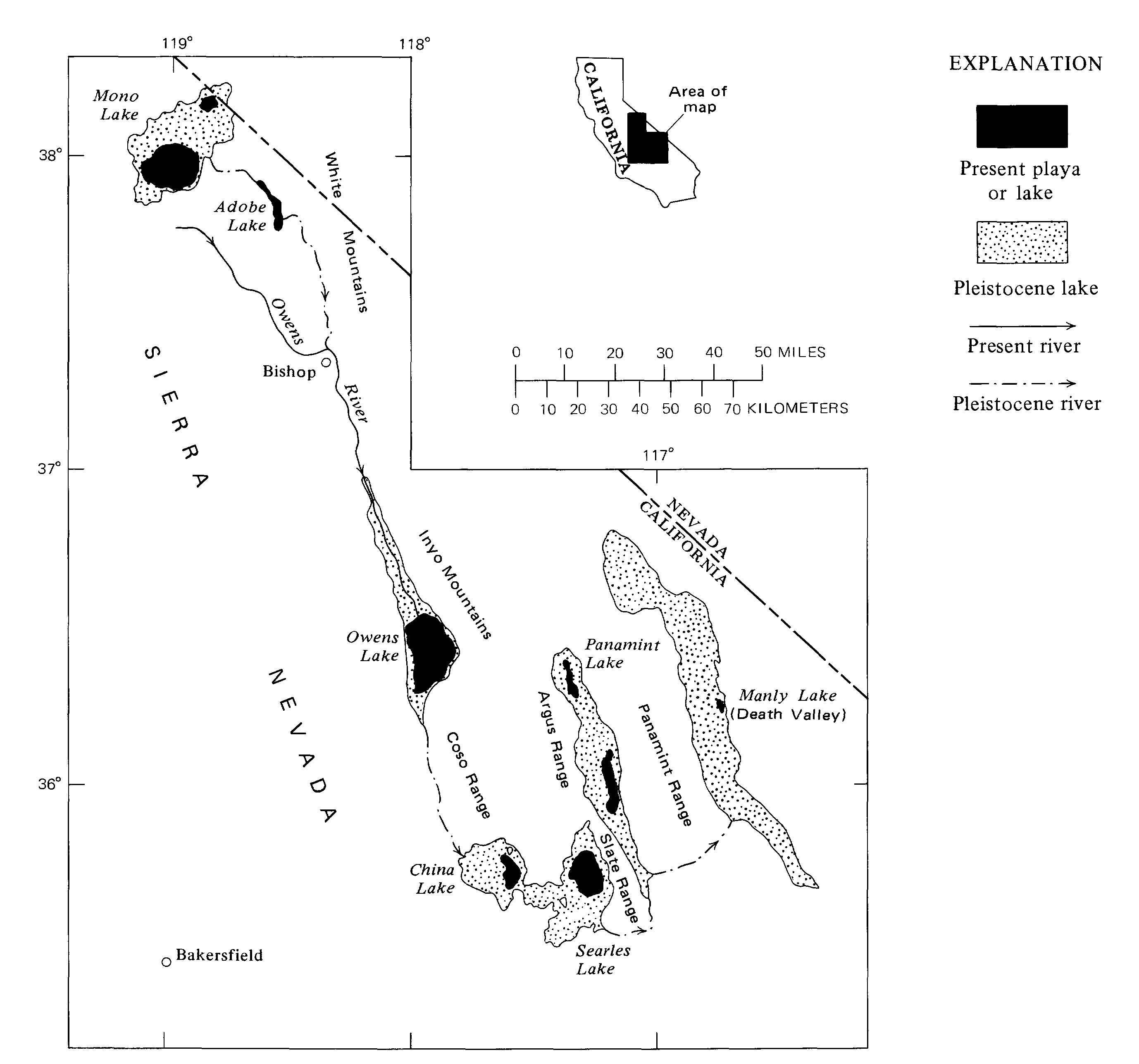
Map showing the system of once-interconnected Pleistocene lakes in eastern California (USGS)

== History ==
Borax was first produced from the dry lake surface in 1873 by John Searles's San Bernardino Borax Mining Company. Searles was the first to haul borax using the famous 20 mule team wagons. In 1873, before the railroad was built to Mojave, refined borax was hauled 175 miles by 20 mule teams from Slate Range Playa (now called Searles Lake) to the harbor at San Pedro. The Searles Lake borax discovery has been designated California Historical Landmark #774, with a plaque at the roadside rest area in Trona. From 1922 to 1928, the Epsom Salts Monorail crossed the Searles Lake on a wooden trestle.

== Mineralogy ==
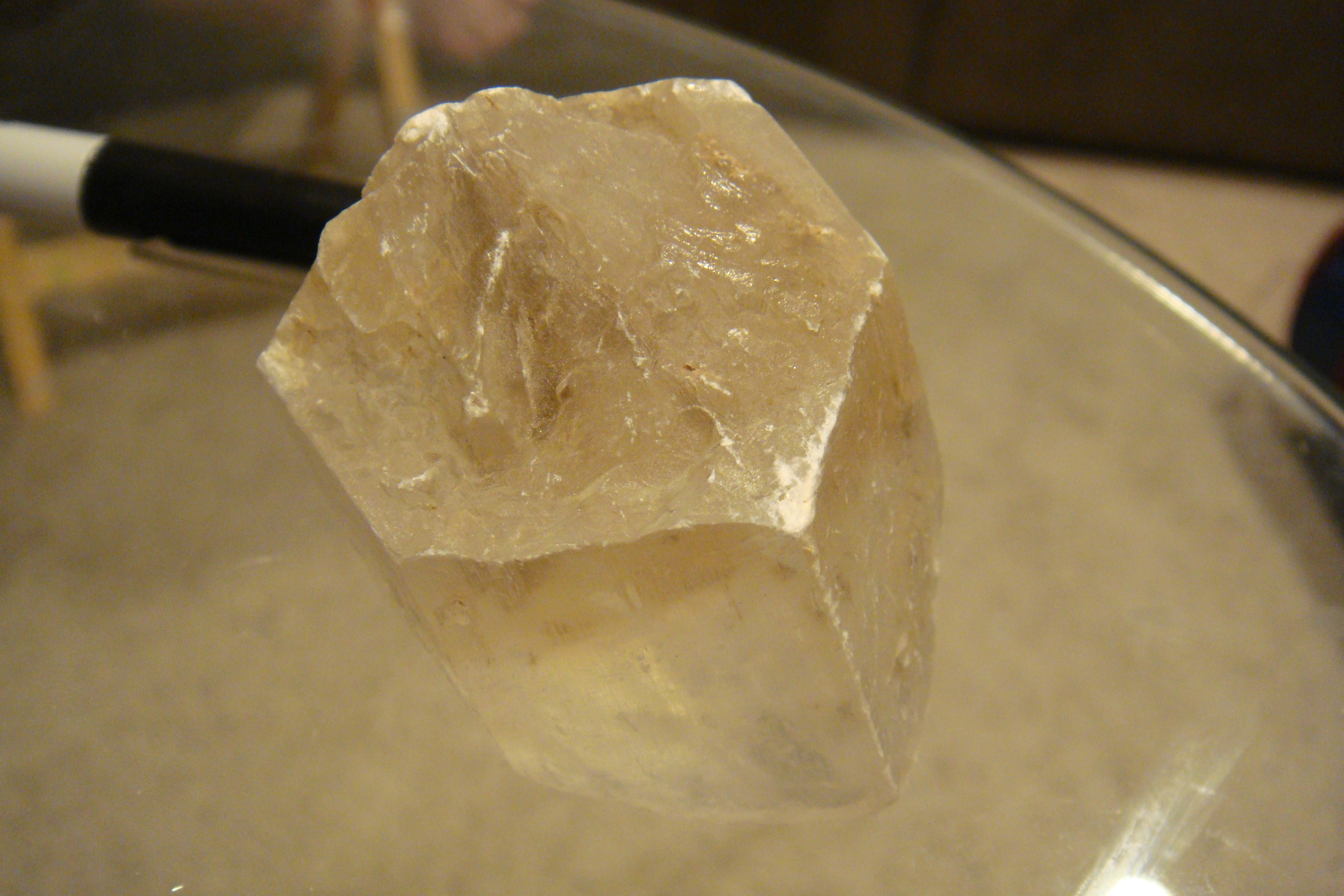
Hanksite, Na_{22}K(SO_{4})_{9}(CO_{3})_{2}Cl, one of the few minerals that is considered a carbonate and a sulfate

Searles Lake is a huge resource of sodium and potassium minerals of the carbonate, sulfate, borate and halide classes of mineralogy. The manufacture of industrial minerals involves a complex solution mining operation in which naturally occurring brines are pumped from wells completed in several salt beds. The brine wells range in depth from near-surface to over 330 ft (100 m) below the salt pan. A network of production wells, injection wells, solar ponds and piping are used in the production and treatment of the brines.

Industrial minerals are extracted from the brines at the Argus, Trona and Westend plants. Minerals are crystallized from the brines, screened, washed, and dried. The crystals are then baked in rotary kilns to drive off water molecules locked in the crystalline structure. Some recrystallization may be required to achieve a desired composition and granular density. This complex extraction process at the three plants is generally referred to as fractional crystallization. It includes the treatment of brines through carbonation extraction, refrigeration extraction and/or solvent extraction. Salt is also harvested from the lake surface and from solar ponds.

Commodities produced by Searles Valley Minerals from their Searles Lake operations include borax, V-Bor (borax with five moles of water), anhydrous borax, boric acid, soda ash, salt cake and salt. Mineral reserves exceed four billion tons.

=== Mineral List ===
- Analcime
- Aphthitalite
- Borax
- Burkeite
- Galeite
- Gaylussite
- Gypsum var: Selenite
- Halite
- Hanksite
- Heulandite
- Feldspar
- Merlinoite
- Mirabilite
- Nahcolite
- Northupite
- Opal
- Phillipsite
- Pirssonite
- Schairerite
- Searlesite
- Sulphohalite
- Teepleite
- Thenardite
- Tincalconite
- Trona
- Tychite
- Ulexite

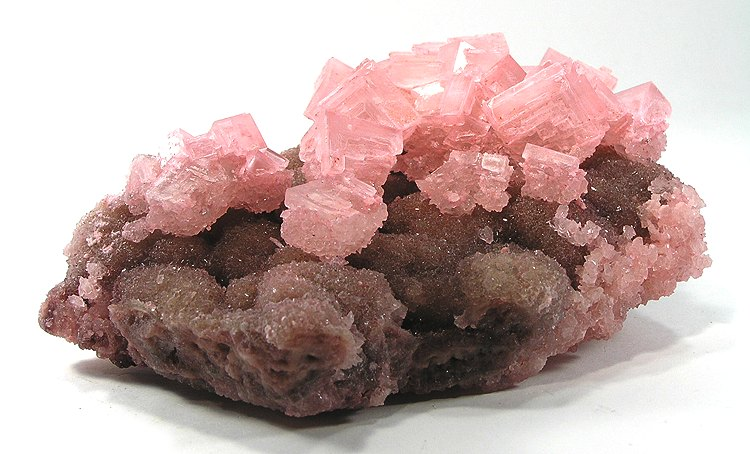
Pink halite (rock salt) crystals from Searles Lake. Matrix is minute nahcolite (bicarbonate of soda). Specimen size: 13.5 x 7.7 x 5.2 cm.

== Trona Pinnacles ==
The Trona Pinnacles are in the California Desert National Conservation Area managed by the Bureau of Land Management.

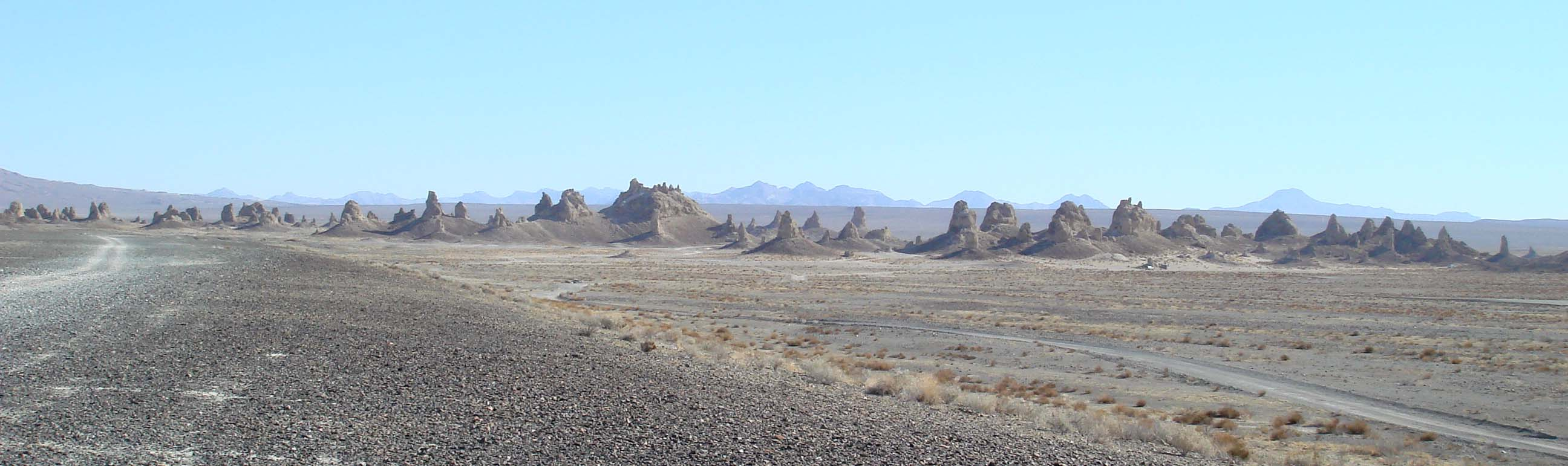
Trona Pinnacles, some as high as 140 ft (43 m), rising from the bed of the Searles Lake basin. Note the white SUV at right for scale.

== Marker ==
California Historical Landmark marker reads:

- NO. 774 SEARLES LAKE BORAX DISCOVERY - John Searles discovered borax on the nearby surface of Searles Lake in 1862. With his brother Dennis, he formed the San Bernardino Borax Mining Company in 1873 and operated it until 1897. The chemicals in Searles Lake-borax, potash, soda ash, salt cake, and lithium-were deposited here by the runoff waters from melting ice-age glaciers, John Searles' discovery has proved to be the world's richest chemical storehouse, containing half the natural elements

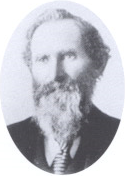
John W. Searles in 1873

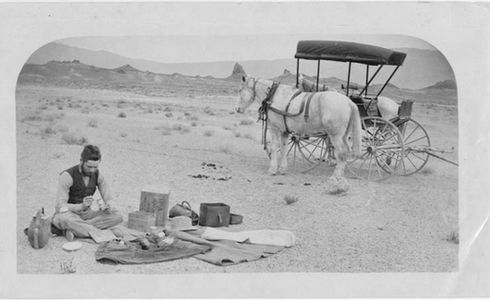
Dennis Searles in 1890 at Searles Lake

- A E Clampus Vitus monument was place to remember the Searles brothers:

The marker reads:

- "This monument commemorates two wagon routes used by the Searles brothers to haul borax from their plant on Borax Lake (now Searles Lake) to the railhead at Mojave. The southern route traveled west of the Trona Pinnacles to Searles' freight station at Garden City. This is the present route of the Trona Railway which connects with the Union Pacific at Searles Station. Garden City was a virtual oasis, providing food and shelter for the teamsters and a barn accommodating 100 mules. The western route went through Salt Wells Canyon (Poison Canyon) to a dry station one mile from the head of the canyon and on to garden City where both routes joined. It then continued through Garlock and connected with the road to Mojave. Erected 2000 by Billy Holcomb Chapter No. 1069, E Clampus Vitus in cooperation with Searles Valley Historical Society."

== See also ==
- List of lakes in California
- California Historical Landmarks in San Bernardino County, California
- Potash wars (California)
