= Searlesite =

Phyllosilicate mineral

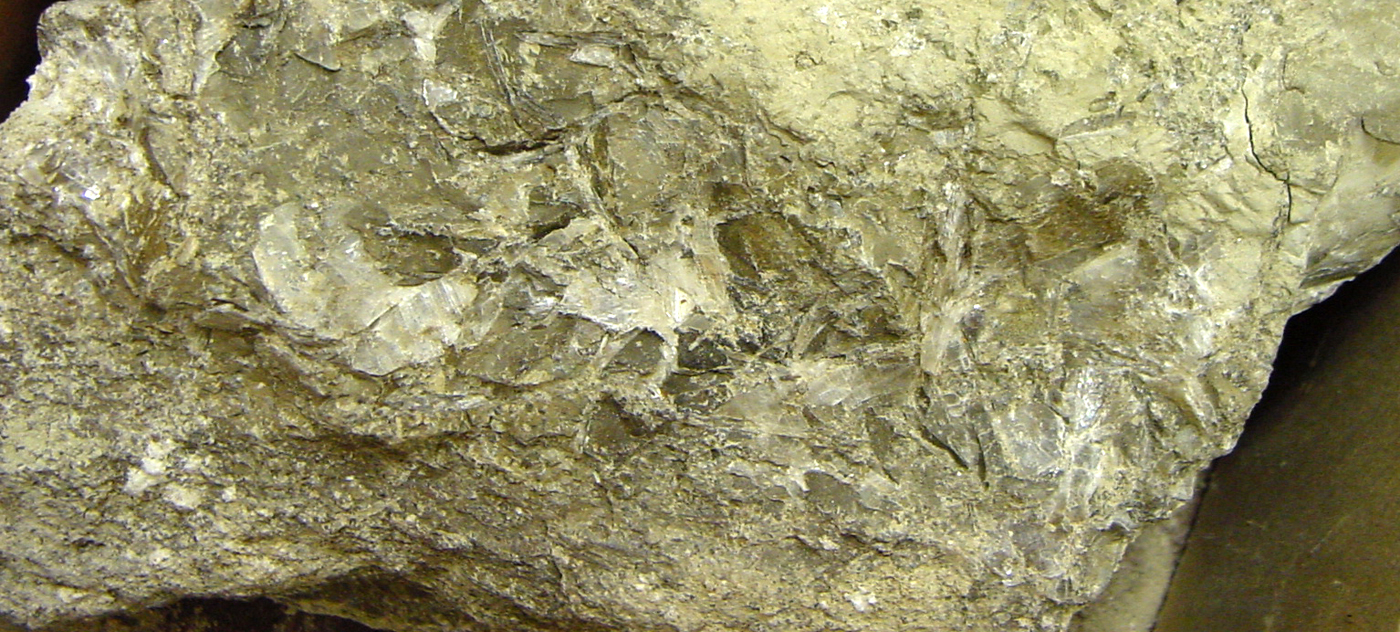
- Searlesite, near Green River, Wyoming

General
- Category: Phyllosilicate minerals
- Formula: NaBSi_{2}O_{5}(OH)_{2}
- IMA symbol: Sle
- Strunz classification: 9.EF.15
- Crystal system: Monoclinic
- Crystal class: Sphenoidal (2) (same H-M symbol)
- Space group: P2_{1}
- Unit cell: a = 7.98 Å, b = 7.06 Å c = 4.9 Å; β = 93.95°

Identification
- Color: White, light brown
- Mohs scale hardness: 1–2
- Luster: Vitreous
- Optical properties: Biaxial (−)
- Refractive index: n_{α} = 1.516 n_{β} = 1.531 n_{γ} = 1.535
- Birefringence: δ = 0.019

Searlesite is a sodium borosilicate mineral, with the chemical formula NaBSi_{2}O_{5}(OH)_{2}. It was discovered in 1914 at Searles Lake, California, and was named to honor John W. Searles (16 November 1828 – 7 October 1897), California pioneer, who drilled the well that yielded the first known Searlesite.

Searlesite is usually found disseminated in fine-grained lacustrine strata and often associated with altering volcanic ash. It may be a minor component of borate deposits, but it is rarely found concentrated or in megascopic crystals and so has not been developed as an ore mineral of boron. However, several lithium deposits including Rhyolite Ridge and Bonnie Claire intend to produce boric acid from searlesite in the future. XRD has shown some material in the high grade deep zone at Bonnie Claire is up to 38% searlesite, and is the primary ore mineral for their future boron extraction stream. It occurs interbedded with oil shales or marls (Green River Formation, US) and in boron-bearing evaporite deposits (California, US); rarely in vugs in phonolite (Point of Rocks, New Mexico).
