= Sulfate carbonate =

Class of chemical compounds

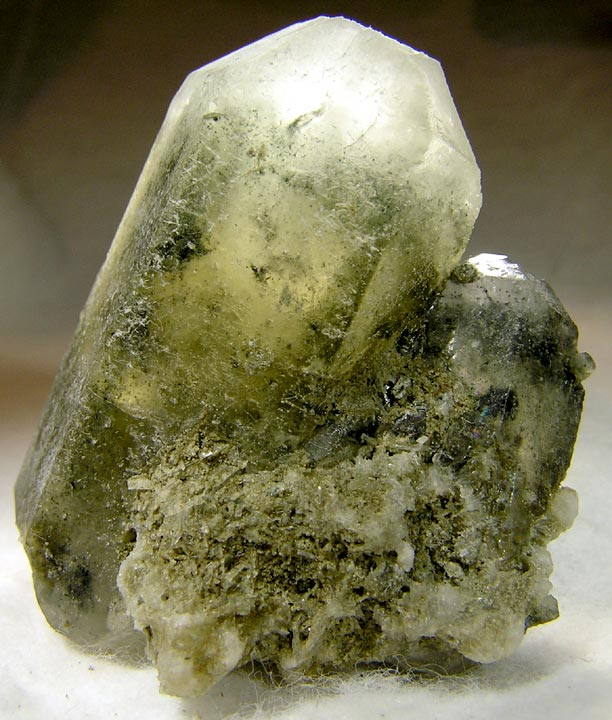
Hanksite

The sulfate carbonates are a compound carbonates, or mixed anion compounds that contain sulfate and carbonate ions. Sulfate carbonate minerals are in the 7.DG and 5.BF Nickel-Strunz groupings.

They may be formed by crystallization from a water solution, or by melting a carbonate and sulfate together.

In some structures carbonate and sulfate can substitute for each other. For example a range from 1.4 to 2.2 Na_{2}SO_{4}•Na_{2}CO_{3} is stable as a solid solution. Silvialite can substitute about half its sulfate with carbonate and the high temperature hexagonal form of sodium sulfate (I) Na_{2}SO_{4} can substitute unlimited proportions of carbonate instead of sulfate.

== Minerals ==
name	formula	system	space group	unit cell	volume Å^{3}	density	optical	ref
Brianyoungite	Zn_{12}(CO_{3})_{3}(SO_{4})(OH)_{16}	Monoclinic	P2_{1}/m	a = 15.724 b = 6.256 c = 5.427 β = 90°	533.8	4.09	Biaxial n_{α} = 1.635 n_{β} = 1.650	
Burkeite	Na_{6}(CO_{3})(SO_{4})_{2}	orthorhombic		a = 7.05 b = 9.21 c = 5.16	335.04	2.57	Biaxial (-) n_{α} = 1.448 n_{β} = 1.489 n_{γ} = 1.493 2V: measured: 34° , calculated: 32° Max birefringence: δ = 0.045	
Caledonite	Pb_{5}Cu_{2}(SO_{4})_{3}(CO_{3})(OH)_{6}	Orthorhombic	Pmn2_{1}	a = 20.089 b = 7.146 c = 6.56	941.7	5.77	Biaxial (-) n_{α} = 1.818(3) n_{β} = 1.866(3) n_{γ} = 1.909(3) 2V: measured: 85° , calculated: 84° Max birefringence: δ = 0.091 bluish green	
Carraraite	Ca_{3}(SO_{4})[Ge(OH)_{6}](CO_{3}) · 12H_{2}O	hexagonal	P6_{3}/m?	a = 11.056 c = 10.629	1125.17		Uniaxial (+) n_{ω} = 1.479(1) n_{ε} = 1.509(1) Max birefringence: δ = 0.030	
Carbonatecyanotrichite	Cu_{4}Al_{2}(CO_{3},SO_{4})(OH)_{12} · 2H_{2}O	Orthorhombic					Biaxial (+) n_{α} = 1.616 n_{β} = 1.630 n_{γ} = 1.677 2V: measured: 55° to 60°, calculated: 60° Max birefringence: δ = 0.061 pale blue	
Claraite	(Cu,Zn)_{15}(AsO_{4})_{2}(CO_{3})_{4}(SO_{4})(OH)_{14}·7H_{2}O	triclinic	P1̅	a = 10.3343 b = 12.8212 c = 14.7889 α = 113.196°, β = 90.811°, γ = 89.818°	1800.9			
Ferrotychite	Na_{6}(Fe,Mn,Mg)_{2}(CO_{3})_{4}(SO_{4})	Isometric	Fd3	a = 13.962	2,721.7	2.79	Isotropic n = 1.550	
Hanksite	Na_{22}K(SO_{4})_{9}(CO_{3})_{2}Cl	hexagonal	P 6_{3}/m	a = 10.4896 c = 21.2415	2024.1	2.562	Uniaxial (-) n_{ω} = 1.481 n_{ε} = 1.461 Max birefringence: δ = 0.020	
Hauckite	Fe^{3+}_{3}(Mg,Mn^{2+})_{24}Zn_{18}(SO_{4})_{4}(CO_{3})_{2}(OH)_{81}	hexagonal	P6/mmm	a = 9.17 c = 30.21	2200	3.02	Uniaxial (+) n_{ω} = 1.630 n_{ε} = 1.638 Max birefringence: δ = 0.008	
Jouravskite	Ca_{3}Mn^{4+}(SO_{4})(CO_{3})(OH)_{6} · 12H_{2}O	Hexagonal	P6_{3}	a = 11.0713 c = 10.6265 Z=3	1128.02		Uniaxial (-) n_{ω} = 1.556 n_{ε} = 1.540 Max birefringence: δ = 0.016	
Korkinoite	Ca_{4}(SO_{4})_{2}(CO_{3})_{2} · 9H_{2}O	Orthorhombic	Pmmm				Biaxial (+)	
Latiumite	(Ca,K)_{4}(Si,Al)_{5}O_{11}(SO_{4},CO_{3})	Monoclinic		a = 12.06 Å, b = 5.08 Å, c = 10.81 Å β = 106°	636.6		Biaxial (+/-) n_{α} = 1.600 - 1.603 n_{β} = 1.606 - 1.609 n_{γ} = 1.614 - 1.615 2V: measured: 83° to 90°, calculated: 84° to 88° Max Birefringence: δ = 0.014	
Leadhillite	Pb_{4}(SO_{4})(CO_{3})_{2}(OH)_{2}	Monoclinic	P2_{1}/b	a = 9.11 b = 20.82 c = 11.59 β = 90.46°	2198	6.55	Biaxial (-) n_{α} = 1.870 n_{β} = 2.009 n_{γ} = 2.010 2V: 10° Max birefringence: δ = 0.140	
Macphersonite	Pb_{4}(SO_{4})(CO_{3})_{2}(OH)_{2}	Orthorhombic		a = 10.38 b = 23.05 c = 9.242	2211.8		Biaxial (-) n_{α} = 1.870 n_{β} = 2.000 n_{γ} = 2.010 2V: measured: 35° calculated: 28° Max birefringence: δ = 0.140	
Manganotychite	Na_{6}(Mn,Fe,Mg)_{2}(SO_{4})(CO_{3})_{4}	Isometric	Fd3	a = 13.9951	2,741.12	2.7	n = 1.544 pink	
Mineevite-Y	Na_{25}BaY_{2}(SO_{4})_{11}(HCO_{3})_{4}(CO_{3})_{2}F_{2}Cl	Hexagonal	P6_{3}/m	a = 8.811 c = 37.03 Z=2	2489.6		Uniaxial (-) n_{ω} = 1.536 n_{ε} = 1.510 Max birefringence: δ = 0.026 pale green	
Nakauriite	Cu_{8}(SO_{4})_{4}(CO_{3})(OH)_{6}•48H_{2}O	orthorhombic		a = 14.58 b = 11.47 c = 16.22	2,712.5	2.39	blue Biaxial (-) n_{α} = 1.585 n_{β} = 1.604 n_{γ} = 1.612 2V: measured: 65° , calculated: 64° Max birefringence: δ = 0.027	
Nasledovite	PbMn_{3}Al_{4}(CO_{3})_{4}(SO_{4})O_{5} · 5H_{2}O					3.069	Biaxial	
Paraotwayite	Ni(OH)_{2-x}(SO_{4},CO_{3})_{0.5x}	monoclinic		a = 7.89 b = 2.96 c = 13.63 β = 91.1°	318	3.30	Biaxial n_{α} = 1.655 n_{γ} = 1.705 Max birefringence: δ = 0.050 emerald-green	
Philolithite	Pb_{12}Mn^{2+}(Mg,Mn^{2+})_{2}(Mn^{2+},Mg)_{4}(CO_{3})_{4}(SO_{4})O_{6}(OH)_{12}Cl_{4}	Tetragonal		a = 12.627 c = 12.595	2008.2		Biaxial (+) n_{α} = 1.920 n_{β} = 1.940 n_{γ} = 1.950 Max birefringence: δ = 0.030 apple green	
Putnisite	SrCa_{4}Cr_{8}^{3+}(CO_{3})_{8}(SO_{4})(OH)_{16}·25 H_{2}O	Orthorhombic	Pnma	a = 15.351 b = 20.421 c = 18.270 Z = 4	5727.3		Biaxial(-); α = 1.552 nβ = 1.583 nγ = 1.599 Max birefringence: δ =0.047 violet	
Pyroaurite	Mg_{6}Fe_{2}(SO_{4},CO_{3})(OH)_{16}·4H_{2}O	Trigonal	R3_m	a = 3.1094 c = 23.4117	196.03	2.1	Uniaxial (-) n_{ω} = 1.564 n_{ε} = 1.543 Max birefringence: δ = 0.021	
Pyroaurite	Mg_{6}Fe_{2}(SO_{4},CO_{3})(OH)_{16}·4H_{2}O	Hexagonal	P6_{3}/mmc	a = 3.113 c = 15.61	131.01			
Rapidcreekite	Ca_{2}(SO_{4})(CO_{3})•4H_{2}O	orthorhombic		a = 15.49 b = 19.18 c = 6.15	1827.15		Biaxial (+) n_{α} = 1.516 n_{β} = 1.518 n_{γ} = 1.531 2V: measured: 45° , calculated: 44° Max birefringence: δ = 0.015	
Schröckingerite	NaCa_{3}(UO_{2})(SO_{4})(CO_{3})_{3}F•10(H_{2}O)	triclinic	P1̅	a = 9.634 b = 9.635 c = 14.391 α = 91.41(1)°, β = 92.33(1)°, γ = 120.26(1)°			Biaxial (-) n_{α} = 1.495 n_{β} = 1.543 n_{γ} = 1.544 Max birefringence: δ = 0.049	
Susannite	Pb_{4}(SO_{4})(CO_{3})_{2}(OH)_{2}	trigonal	P3	a = 9.07 Å, c = 11.57 Å Z=3	824.62	6.52	clear	
Tatarskite	Ca_{6}Mg_{2}(SO_{4})_{2}(CO_{3})_{2}(OH)_{4}Cl_{4}•7H_{2}O	Orthorhombic				2.341	n_{α} = 1.567(2) n_{β} = 1.654(2) n_{γ} = 1.722 biaxial(-) 2V=83	
Thaumasite	Ca_{3}(SO_{4})[Si(OH)_{6}](CO_{3}) · 12H_{2}O	hexagonal	P6_{3}	a = 11.030 c = 10.396	1095.3		Uniaxial (-) n_{ω} = 1.507 n_{ε} = 1.468 Max birefringence: δ = 0.039	
Tychite	Na_{6}Mg_{2}(SO_{4})(CO_{3})_{4}	Isometric	Fd3	a = 13.9038 Z=8	2687.82	2.456	isotropic	
Alloriite	Na_{19}K_{6}Ca_{5}[Al_{22}Si_{26}O_{96}](SO_{4})_{5}Cl(CO_{3})_{x}(H_{2}O)	trigonal	P3_{1}c	a = 12.892 c = 21.340				
Potassium-Schröckingerite	KCa_{3}(UO_{2})(CO_{3})_{3}(SO_{4})F•10H_{2}O	triclinic					Yellow	

== Artificial ==
name	formula	formula weight	crystal system	space group	unit cell	volume	density	refractive index	comment	CAS	reference
	Na_{4}CO_{3}SO_{4}		Hexagonal	P3̅m1	a=5.2284 c=6.8808 Z=1		2.538	uniaxial (-) n=~1.45			
	Mg_{4}(OH)2(CO_{3})_{2}SO_{4}·6H_{2}O										
LDH-SO_{4}-CO_{3}	Mg_{6}Al_{2}SO_{4}CO_{3}(OH)_{14}·4H_{2}O			P3̅m	a=3.070 c=22.3				layered		
	Co_{6}Al_{2}SO_{4}CO_{3}(OH)_{14}·4H_{2}O										
	Cu_{6}Al_{2}SO_{4}CO_{3}(OH)_{14}·4H_{2}O										
	Y_{10}(SO_{4})_{5}(CO_{3})_{4}(OH)_{12}(H_{2}O)_{4}		tetragonal	P4̅2_{1}m	a=10.6072 c=8.5386 Z=1	960.7	3.308				
	Tm_{10}(SO_{4})_{5}(CO_{3})_{4}(OH)_{12}(H_{2}O)_{4}		tetragonal	P4̅2_{1}m	a=10.5231 c=8.5117 Z=1	942.55	4.781				
	Yb_{10}(SO_{4})_{5}(CO_{3})_{4}(OH)_{12}(H_{2}O)_{4}		tetragonal	P4̅2_{1}m	a=10.4796 c=8.4679 Z=1	929.96	4.919				
	Lu_{10}(SO_{4})_{5}(CO_{3})_{4}(OH)_{12}(H_{2}O)_{4}		tetragonal	P4̅2_{1}m	a=10.4388 c=8.4414 Z=1	919.85	5.008				
Complexes
Tetrammine carbonatocobalt(III) sulfate trihydrate	[Co(NH_{3})_{4}CO_{3}]_{2}SO_{4}·3H_{2}O		Monoclinic	P2_{1}/c	a=7.455 b=10.609 c=23.627 β =98.346 Z=4	1849	1.88		dark red		
μ-Carbonato-bis(pentaamminecobalt(III)) sulfate tetrahydrate	[Co(NH_{3})_{5}]_{2}CO_{3}SO_{4}·4H_{2}O								dark red	49731-04-6	
μ-Carbonato-μ-dihydroxo-bis(triamminecobalt(III)) sulfate pentahydrate	[(NH_{3})_{3}Co(μ-OH)_{2}(μ-CO_{3})Co(NH_{3})_{3}]SO_{4} . 5H_{2}O	500.21	Triclinic		a= 6.6914 b= 11.2847 c= 11.825, α = 92.766 β= 99.096 γ= 101.496	861.1	1.929		dark red	75476-69-6	
