= Argus, California =

Unincorporated community in California, United States

Argus
- Unincorporated community
- Location in California Argus (the United States)
- Coordinates: 35°44′50″N 117°23′43″W
- Country: United States
- State: California
- County: San Bernardino
- Elevation: 1,650 ft (503 m)
- Time zone: UTC−8 (Pacific Time Zone)
  - Summer (DST): UTC−7 (PDT)
- Area codes: 442/760
- FIPS code: 06-02616
- GNIS feature ID: 238695

Argus is an unincorporated community in the Searles Valley of the Mojave Desert, in northwestern San Bernardino County, California. Argus is 17 miles (27 km) east-northeast of Ridgecrest.

== Argus Cogeneration Plant ==
Argus was home to the last coal fired circulating fluidized bed (CFB) combustion plant in the state of California, which produced 96 megawatts of power. The plant was shut down due to changing emissions regulations in the state of California.

== Searles Valley census-designated place ==
Argus and the communities of Pioneer Point, Trona, and Searles Valley (community) make up the Searles Valley census-designated place.

== See also ==
- Populated places in the Mojave Desert
