= Tincalconite =

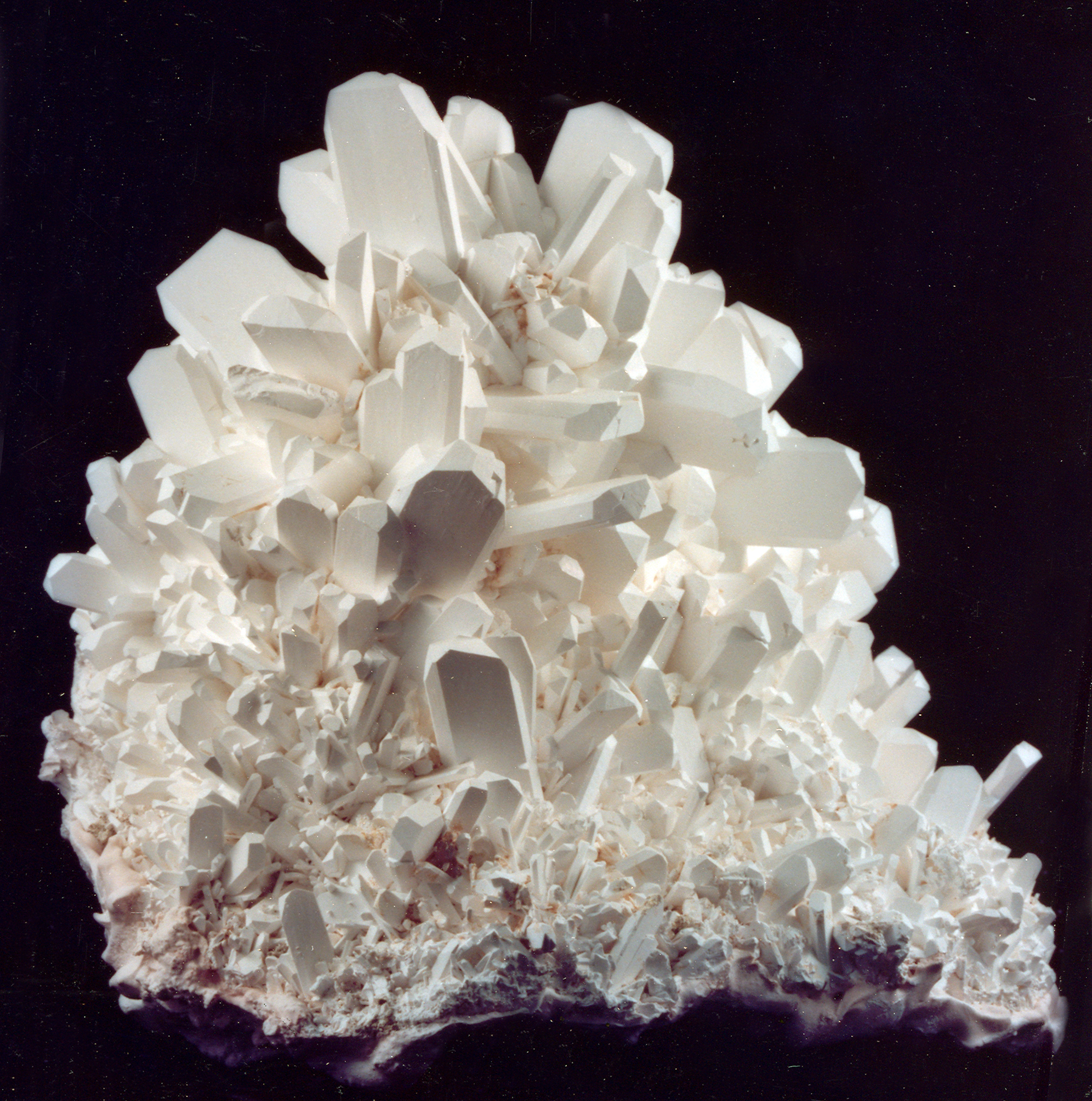

General
- Category: Nesoborates
- Formula: Na_{2}[B_{4}O_{5}(OH)_{4}]·3H_{2}O
- IMA symbol: Tnc
- Strunz classification: 6.DA.15
- Crystal system: Trigonal
- Crystal class: Trapezohedral (32); H-M symbol: (32)
- Space group: R32

Tincalconite is a hydrous sodium borate mineral closely related to borax, and is a secondary mineral that forms as a dehydration product of borax. Its formula is Na_{2}B_{4}O_{7}·5H_{2}O or Na_{2}[B_{4}O_{5}(OH)_{4}]·3H_{2}O.

Tincalconite typically occurs as a fine grained white powder. It crystallizes in the hexagonal crystal system and has been found as primary euhedral di-rhombohedral, pseudo-octahedral crystals. It is also found pseudomorphically replacing borax crystals. It has a specific gravity of 1.88 and a Mohs hardness of 2. Refractive index values are nω=1.460 and nε=1.470.

While most tincalconite is created by man through exposing borax to dry air, there are natural occurrences of tincalconite, as in Searles Lake, California where it was first described in 1878. In addition to several California and Nevada locations it is reported from Argentina, Italy, Turkey and Ukraine.

The name comes from "tincal", Sanskrit for borax, and Greek, "konis", meaning powder, for its composition and typical powdery nature.

== Gallery ==
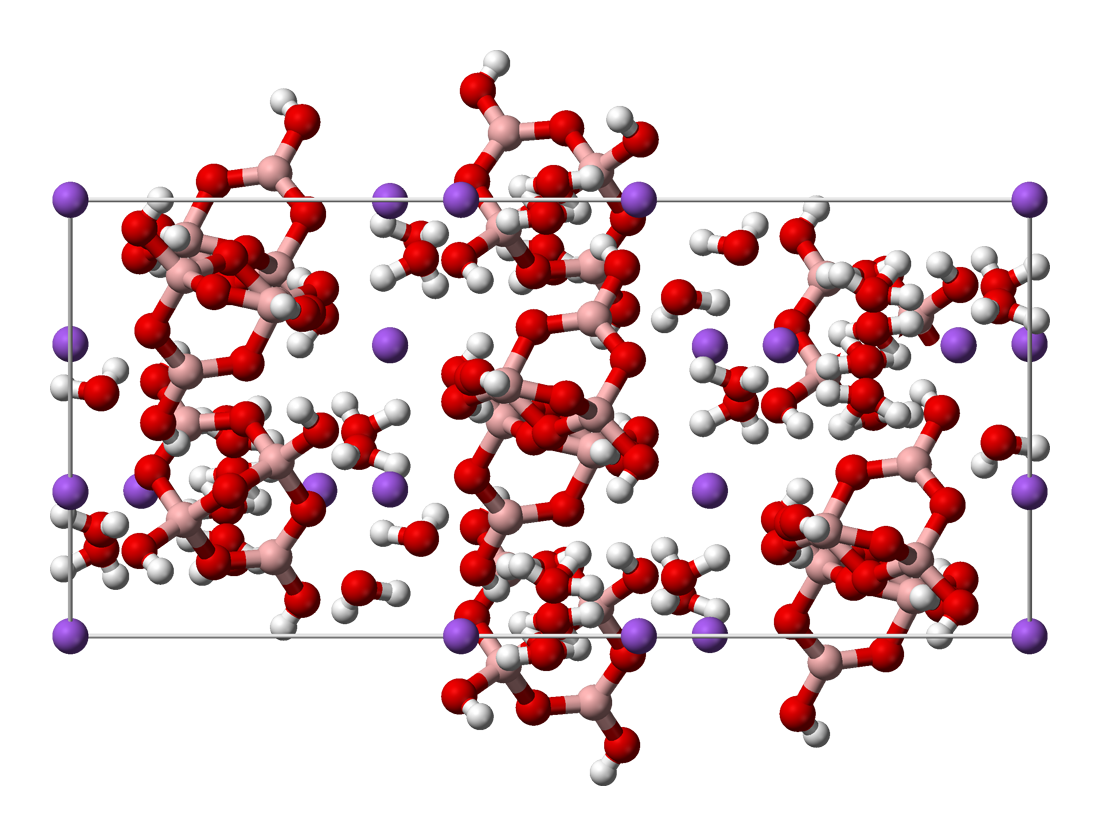
Ball-and-stick model of the unit cell of tincalconite

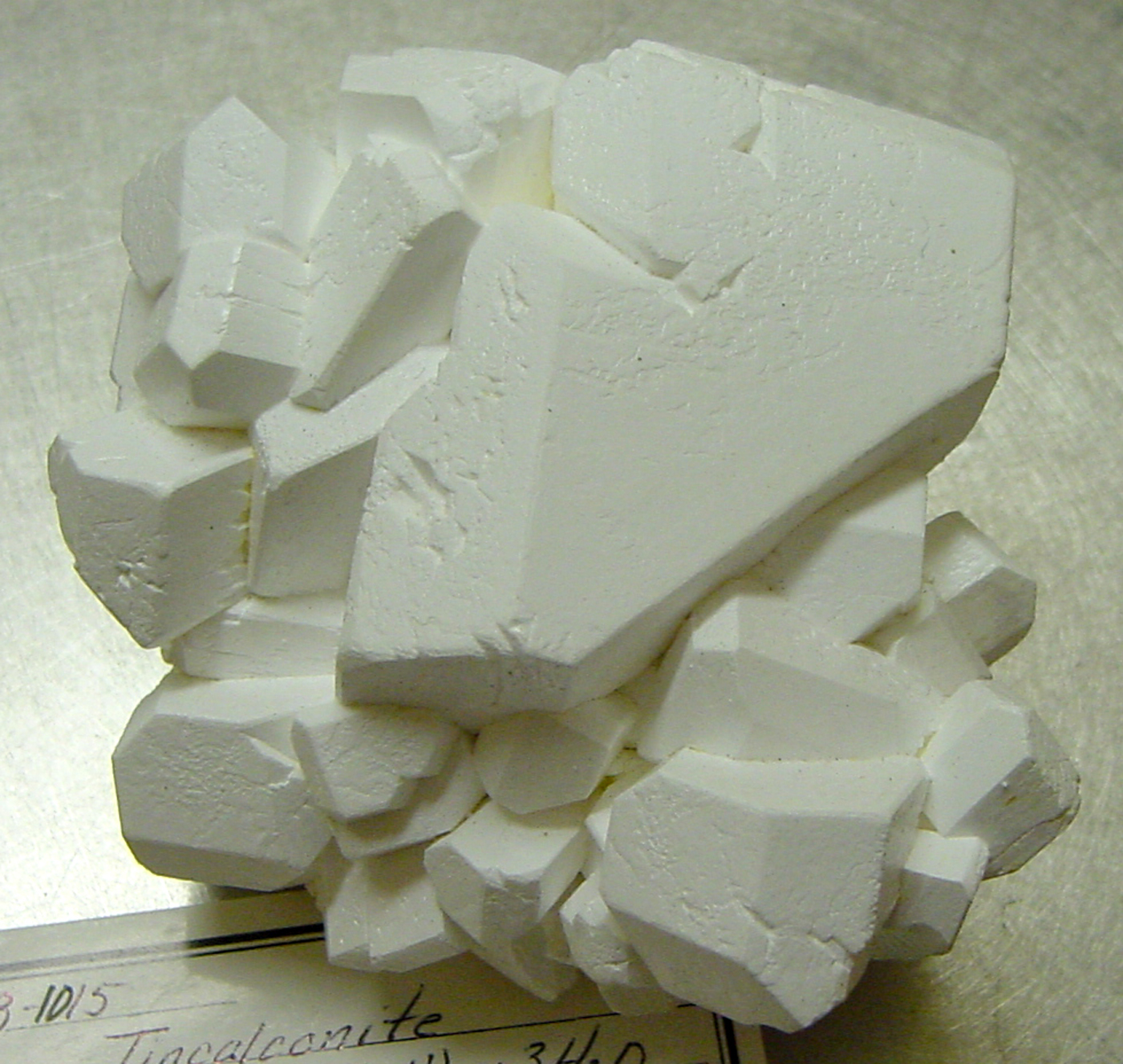
Tincalconite, Boron, California
