= Sierra Highway =

Road in California, United States

- El Camino Sierra
- Sierra Highway highlighted in red

Route information
- Length: 424 mi (682 km)
- Existed: 1910–present
- Component highways: SR 14U in Los Angeles and Santa Clarita; SR 14 from Rosamond to Inyokern; US 395 from Inyokern to Topaz Lake; SR 89 from Topaz Lake to South Lake Tahoe

Major junctions
- South end: San Fernando Road in Los Angeles
- I-5 in Los Angeles; SR 58 near Mojave; US 395 near Inyokern; US 6 in Bishop; US 395 near Topaz Lake
- North end: US 50 / SR 89 in South Lake Tahoe

Location
- Country: United States
- State: California
- Counties: Los Angeles, Kern, Inyo, Mono, Alpine, El Dorado

Highway system
- State highways in California; Interstate; US; State; Scenic; History; Pre‑1964; Unconstructed; Deleted; Freeways

Sierra Highway or El Camino Sierra is a historic route in California, United States, that connects Los Angeles with the Eastern Sierra and Lake Tahoe. The trail formed in the 19th century before it was rebuilt as highways in the early 20th century. It follows parts of modern State Route 14, U.S. Route 395 and State Route 89. Two portions of this road are currently explicitly signed as Sierra Highway. The first is an old alignment of SR 14 (former U.S. Route 6) from Los Angeles to Mojave. This road is also signed with the unusual designation of State Route 14U through the city of Santa Clarita, and unsigned with the same 14U designation in the city of Los Angeles. The second part signed as Sierra Highway is a portion of US 395 in Bishop.

Traversing the extremes of California, from the Mojave Desert to the Sierra Nevada, El Camino Sierra has been advertised to the world as a highway to showcase the natural beauty of California as far back as 1910. Though most of the original Sierra Highway was rebuilt or bypassed in the early 1970s with modern highways, the road is still well known. The portion through the San Gabriel Mountains is noted as the primary filming location for the film Duel.

== Route description ==
State Route 14U
- Location: Los Angeles–Santa Clarita
- Existed: 1971–present

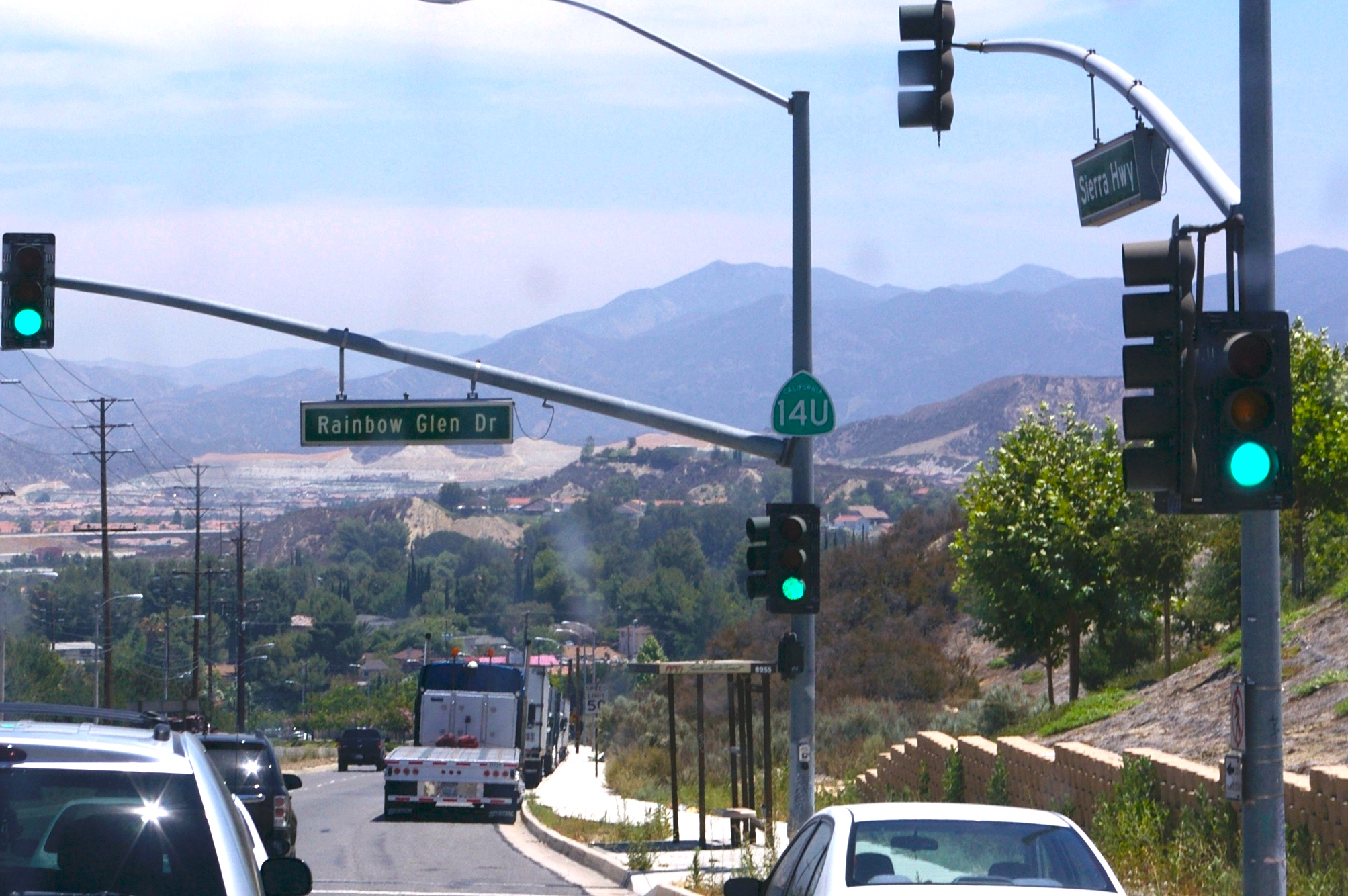
Sierra Highway in Santa Clarita. Although Route 14 was moved to a freeway bypass years ago, this portion remains under state control in a state of bureaucratic limbo, signed as Route 14 "Un-relinquished"

El Camino Sierra connects Los Angeles with Lake Tahoe along the eastern edge of California, serving the counties of Los Angeles, Kern, Inyo, Mono, Alpine and El Dorado. The highway exists as a roadway now called Sierra Highway from Los Angeles to Mojave. North of Mojave, El Camino Sierra is better known by the numbered designations in current use. While traversing the state, the highway crosses several mountain passes. The highway crests the San Gabriel Mountains via Soledad Pass. While in the Sierra Nevada the highway crosses Sherwin Summit, Deadman Summit, Conway Summit, Devil's Gate Pass, Monitor Pass and Luther Pass.

Sierra Highway begins at Tunnel Station within the northernmost limits of the City of Los Angeles, where it intersects with San Fernando Road. This junction was historically the intersection of U.S. Route 99 and U.S. Route 6. It is located adjacent to the intersection of the replacement freeways, the Newhall Pass interchange of Interstate 5 and State Route 14. The highway then enters an unincorporated area of Los Angeles County before becoming one of the main thoroughfares of the City of Santa Clarita.

From Los Angeles and through Santa Clarita, Route 14 was moved to the Antelope Valley Freeway alignment in 1971; however, the process to decommission the old alignment of Route 14 is not complete. As a result, the segment within Los Angeles and a portion within Santa Clarita carry the designation of State Route 14U, the U signifying "un-relinquished". Formal specifications for Route 14U are not published on Caltrans logs, but the route's existence is acknowledged in both Caltrans' bridge inventory logs and its postmile query tool. According to the City of Santa Clarita, Caltrans maintains Sierra Highway (14U) within the city from about 500 feet (0.15 km) north of Newhall Avenue to Whispering Leaves Drive. The remaining part of Sierra Highway through the City of Santa Clarita is maintained by the city and not part of the 14U designation. In 2018 Caltrans funded a new pedestrian overpass as one item on a list of requested improvements by the city before they accept relinquishment of the road from the state.

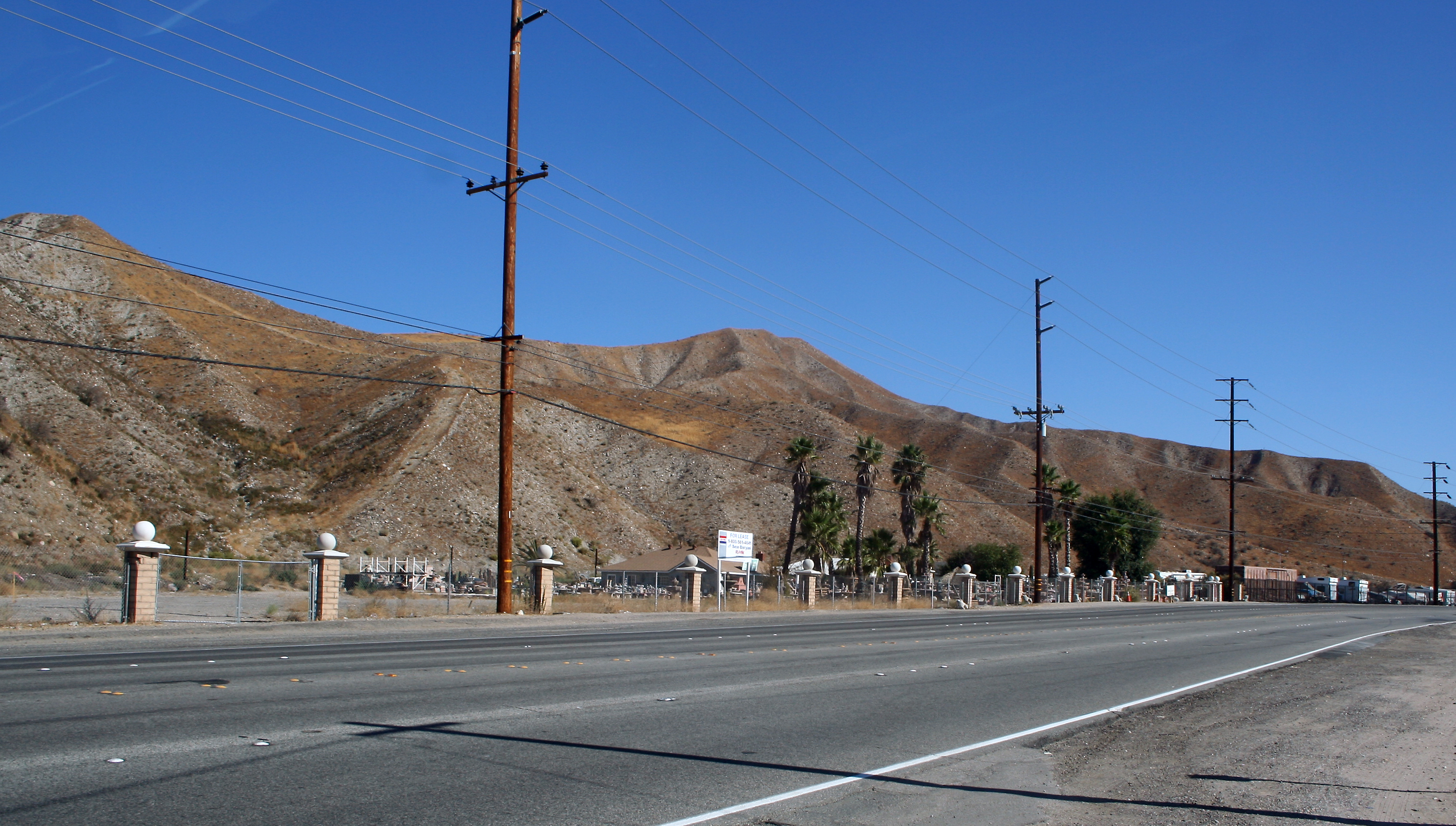
Sierra Highway in Santa Clarita, about a mile north of Soledad Canyon Road.

Sierra Highway, modern Route 14, and a main line of the Union Pacific Railroad all cross the San Gabriel Mountains, cresting the mountains at Soledad Pass (elevation 3,179 feet (969 m)). The three transportation arteries use different paths up the mountains, separating at Santa Clarita and converging near Acton. Sierra Highway uses Mint Canyon, the railroad uses Soledad Canyon and the modern Route 14 is a hybrid route using the ridges and side canyons between the two older routes. These canyons are formed by the Santa Clara River and its tributaries.

Upon exiting the mountains, Sierra Highway enters the Antelope Valley and serves as one of the main streets of Palmdale, Lancaster, and Rosamond. The highway runs parallel to the modern Route 14 and the railroad, becoming a frontage road. Just shy of Mojave the freeway portion of Route 14 ends, while the frontage road becomes a dirt path and eventually terminates. From this point, the canonical route of Sierra Highway joins State Route 14, passing through downtown Mojave.

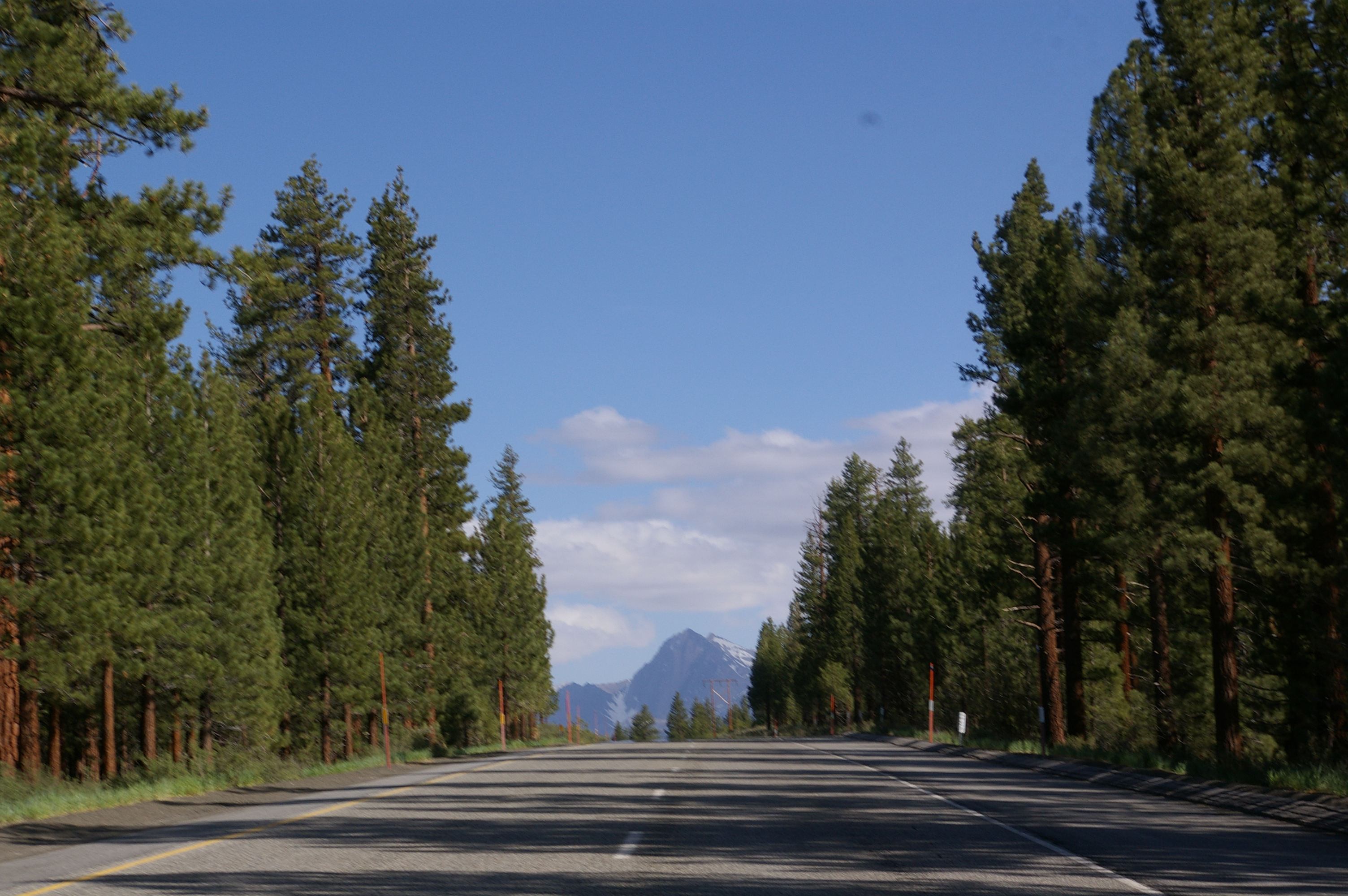
Southbound US 395 cresting Deadman Summit with Mount Morrison in the distance

North of Mojave the alignments of State Routes 14 and 89, and U.S. Route 395 have not significantly changed since first paved, and are called El Camino Sierra. Significant portions have been upgraded to a divided highway; however, most of the upgrades used the same alignment as the old two lane road. The highway cuts across Red Rock Canyon State Park to follow a series of valleys along the crest of the Sierra Nevada. While traversing the Owens Valley, the Sierra Highway passes Mount Whitney, the highest point in the contiguous United States, 10,000 feet (3,000 m) above the highway. As of 2009, the only other signed section of Sierra Highway is a portion of U.S. 395 past the separation with U.S. 6 in Bishop.

U.S. 395 was rebuilt on a new alignment on the ascent to Sherwin Summit and around Crowley Lake. Unlike the highway relocation in southern California, the old alignments have been renamed, now called Lower Rock Creek Road, Old Sherwin Grade, and Crowley Creek Road; not Sierra Highway. From here to Lake Tahoe, the highway crosses mountainous terrain inside the Sierra Nevada, giving the highway its name. While in the Sierra Nevada, the road passes by attractions such as Mammoth Mountain, Yosemite National Park and Mono Lake. El Camino Sierra separates from U.S. 395, just prior to the Nevada state line at Topaz Lake, following SR 89. This is the only portion of the route not used year-round, as Caltrans closes Route 89 over Monitor Pass during winter months. Motorists destined for Lake Tahoe during the winter closures can continue along US 395 into Nevada, and return to California via Nevada State Route 88 or Nevada State Route 207.

== History ==
=== El Camino Sierra ===
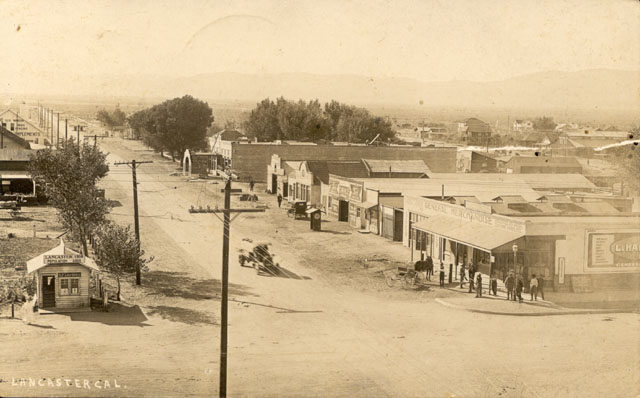
1918, Lancaster, California. Looking south on Sierra Highway, at the intersection with Lancaster Boulevard.

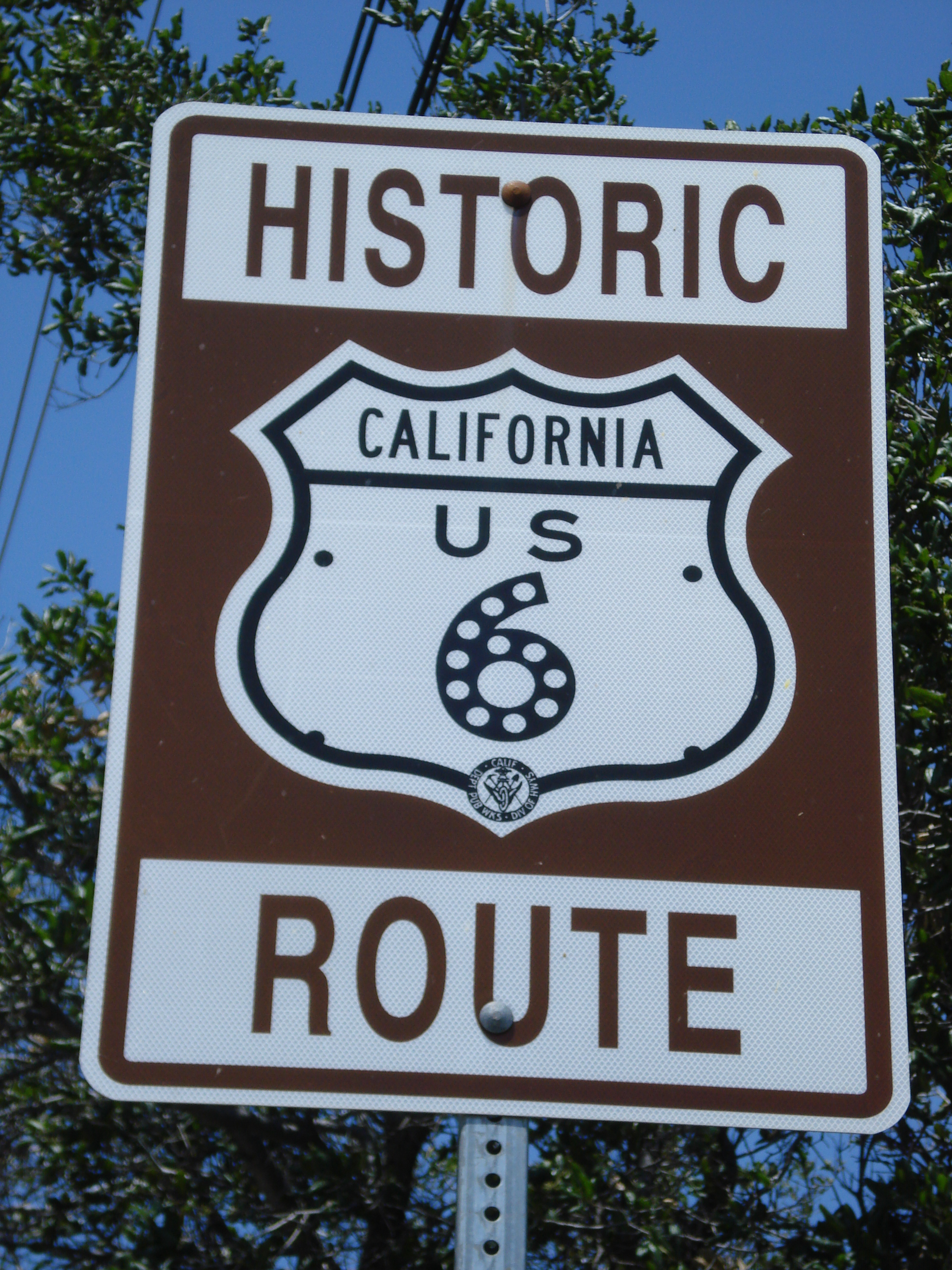
Historic Route 6 sign along Sierra Hwy.

The first recorded journey along what would become El Camino Sierra was by Jedediah Smith in 1826. The trail was in common use by prospectors passing through the area because of the California Gold Rush and Comstock Lode. While still mostly a dirt road, several people began promoting El Camino Sierra as a scenic route. In 1910, the Los Angeles Times announced that Governor Gillet had announced funding to construct a new road to connect El Camino Real with Yosemite National Park. When finished, a new "wonderful circuit" route would be complete and El Camino Sierra would become "one of the most beautiful scenic routes in the world." In 1912, the Southern Pacific Railroad published an article called "Two Mules and a Motorist" in which the author's trip down El Camino Sierra was detailed, promoting the trail as a scenic side trip, via pack mules, from its rail lines. In 1915, the California Teachers Association distributed a promotional book to the annual convention of the National Education Association. This book contained an article that sung the praises of this "soon-to-be-world-famous highway" called El Camino Sierra. While noting that it was still mostly an unimproved trail, the article assured the readers that county and state officials were working frantically to upgrade the route and, with the aid of convict labor, this would soon be a "boulevard the entire distance from Los Angeles to Lake Tahoe." The article concluded by stating El Camino Sierra was "a highway with a hundred by-ways, each by-way with a hundred wonders". The article also implored the state legislature to extend El Camino Sierra to Truckee, Quincy and Susanville using a route similar to modern State Route 89, SR 70 returning to US 395.

By 1918, El Camino Sierra had been included in the Blue Book, an early road atlas of the United States. The Los Angeles Times declared El Camino Sierra complete on February 19, 1931, announcing that the portion from Mojave to Owens Valley was now paved, and would be dedicated the following Sunday.

=== Sierra Highway ===
During the 1930s, two U.S. highways, both formed in 1926, were extended into California using El Camino Sierra. The southern terminus of U.S. 395 was extended from Spokane, Washington to San Diego, using El Camino Sierra from near what is now Topaz Lake to Inyokern, by 1935. By 1937, U.S. Route 6 was extended from Colorado, mostly along the Midland Trail, to Long Beach using El Camino Sierra south of Bishop. As part of the 1964 state highway renumbering US 6 was truncated at Bishop, and the route from the separation with US 395 to I-5 was renumbered SR 14.

Though during the 1970s most of Sierra Highway was bypassed by freeways and expressways, the old two-lane road remained a famous roadway. In 1971, Steven Spielberg made his first feature-length film, Duel, along Sierra Highway, near Acton. The film is about an unseen truck driver who stalks and attempts to kill an innocent motorist trapped in the truck's game. It prominently shows the desert portions of Sierra Highway. With Duel's status, both restorations of the truck used in the movie, as well as replicas exist. The owner of one such truck has driven it along Sierra Highway for nostalgia, enjoying the terrified looks received from passing motorists who recognize it. Other movies have since been filmed in the vicinity, including scenes in The Terminator.

== Major intersections ==
County	Location	mi	km	Destinations	Notes
Los Angeles	Los Angeles	0.0	0.0	San Fernando Road, The Old Road	South end of Sierra Highway; former US 99
Los Angeles	Los Angeles	0.1	0.16	I-5 north (Golden State Freeway) / SR 14 north (Antelope Valley Freeway) / Foothill Boulevard – Sacramento, Palmdale	Interchange; south end of unsigned SR 14U; entrance from I-5 north is accessible from San Fernando Road; entrance from SR 14 is accessible from The Old Road; no exit or entrance from I-5 south
Los Angeles	Los Angeles	0.2	0.32	North end of unsigned SR 14U at Los Angeles–unincorporated area line	
Los Angeles	Santa Clarita	2.5	4.0	Newhall Avenue – Newhall, Saugus, Valencia	Former SR 126 west; formerly San Fernando Road; south end of SR 14U
Los Angeles	Santa Clarita	3.6	5.8	Placerita Canyon Road – Palmdale	
Los Angeles	Santa Clarita	5.0	8.0	Golden Valley Road	
Los Angeles	Santa Clarita	6.3	10.1	Via Princessa to SR 14 south (Antelope Valley Freeway) – Los Angeles	North end of SR 14U; exit from SR 14 north connects directly to Sierra Highway
Los Angeles	Santa Clarita	7.3	11.7	Soledad Canyon Road	
Los Angeles	Santa Clarita	8.1	13.0	Skyline Ranch Road	
Los Angeles		10.3	16.6	Sand Canyon Road	
Los Angeles		10.6	17.1	Vasquez Canyon Road	
Los Angeles	Agua Dulce	18.8	30.3	Agua Dulce Canyon Road	
Los Angeles		24.9	40.1	SR 14 (Antelope Valley Freeway) / Ward Road, to Escondido Canyon Road – Palmdale, Los Angeles	Interchange; SR 14 exit 22
Los Angeles	Acton	26.7	43.0	Crown Valley Road – Acton	
Los Angeles	Acton	28.9	46.5	Santiago Road	
Los Angeles	Acton	30.4	48.9	SR 14 (Antelope Valley Freeway) / Soledad Canyon Road – Palmdale, Los Angeles	Interchange; SR 14 exit 27
Los Angeles		32.5	52.3	SR 14 (Antelope Valley Freeway) / CR N3 (Angeles Forest Highway) to SR 2 (Angeles Crest Highway) – Palmdale, Los Angeles, Pasadena, La Cañada Flintridge	Interchange; SR 14 exit 30
Los Angeles		33.7	54.2	Pearblossom Highway – Littlerock, Victorville	
Los Angeles	Palmdale	36.4	58.6	Avenue S	
Los Angeles	Palmdale	37.9	61.0	SR 138 (Palmdale Boulevard) – Victorville, San Bernardino, Los Angeles	
Los Angeles	Palmdale	39.5	63.6	Rancho Vista Boulevard (Avenue P)	Serves LA/Palmdale Regional Airport
Los Angeles	Palmdale	41.6	66.9	R. Lee Ermey Avenue (Avenue N)	
Los Angeles	Palmdale	42.6	68.6	Columbia Way (Avenue M)	
Los Angeles	Lancaster	43.6	70.2	Avenue L	Interchange
Los Angeles	Lancaster	44.6	71.8	Avenue K	
Los Angeles	Lancaster	45.6	73.4	CR N5 (Avenue J)	
Los Angeles	Lancaster	46.6	75.0	Avenue I	
Los Angeles	Lancaster	47.7	76.8	Avenue H	Interchange; southbound entrance only; other access is via Avenue G-12 and 7th Street West
Los Angeles	Lancaster	48.7	78.4	Avenue G	Serves General William J. Fox Airfield
Los Angeles		49.7	80.0	Avenue F	
Los Angeles		51.8	83.4	Avenue D to SR 14 (Antelope Valley Freeway) / SR 138 west – Gorman	
Kern	Rosamond	57.8	93.0	Rosamond Boulevard – Rosamond, Edwards AFB	
Kern		64.1	103.2	Backus Road	
Kern		67.3	108.3	SR 14 south / Silver Queen Road – Los Angeles	Interchange; south end of SR 14 overlap; SR 14 exit 64
See SR 14 (KER R12.15–64.56)
Kern				Northern terminus of SR 14 US 395 south – San Bernardino	Interchange; southbound exit and northbound entrance; north end of SR 14 overlap; south end of US 395 overlap
See US 395 (KER R29.64–MNO 116.96)
Mono				Southern terminus of SR 89 US 395 north – Carson City	North end of US 395 overlap; south end of SR 89 overlap
See SR 89 (MNO 0.00–ED 8.55)
El Dorado				US 50 west – Placerville US 50 east / SR 89 north – South Lake Tahoe	Roundabout; north end of Sierra Highway; north end of SR 89 overlap
1.000 mi = 1.609 km; 1.000 km = 0.621 mi: Concurrency terminus; Incomplete access
