= Conway Summit =

Mountain pass in Mono County, California

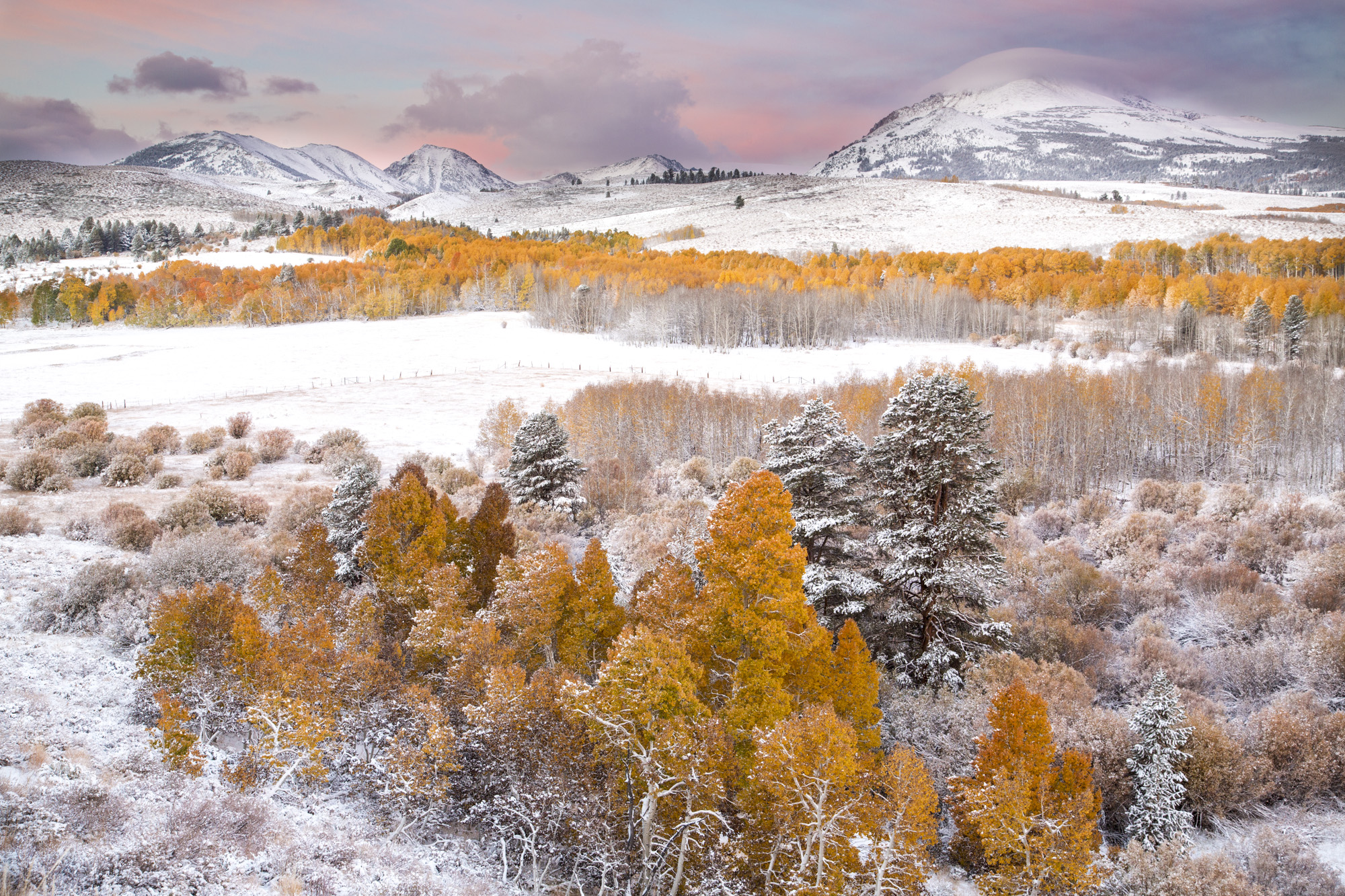
- Early snowfall at Conway Summit

- Location within California
- Elevation: 8,143 ft (2,482 m)
- Traversed by: US 395

Third Approach
- Location: Mono County, California, United States
- Coordinates: 38°05′17″N 119°10′55″W
- Topo map: USGS Lundy

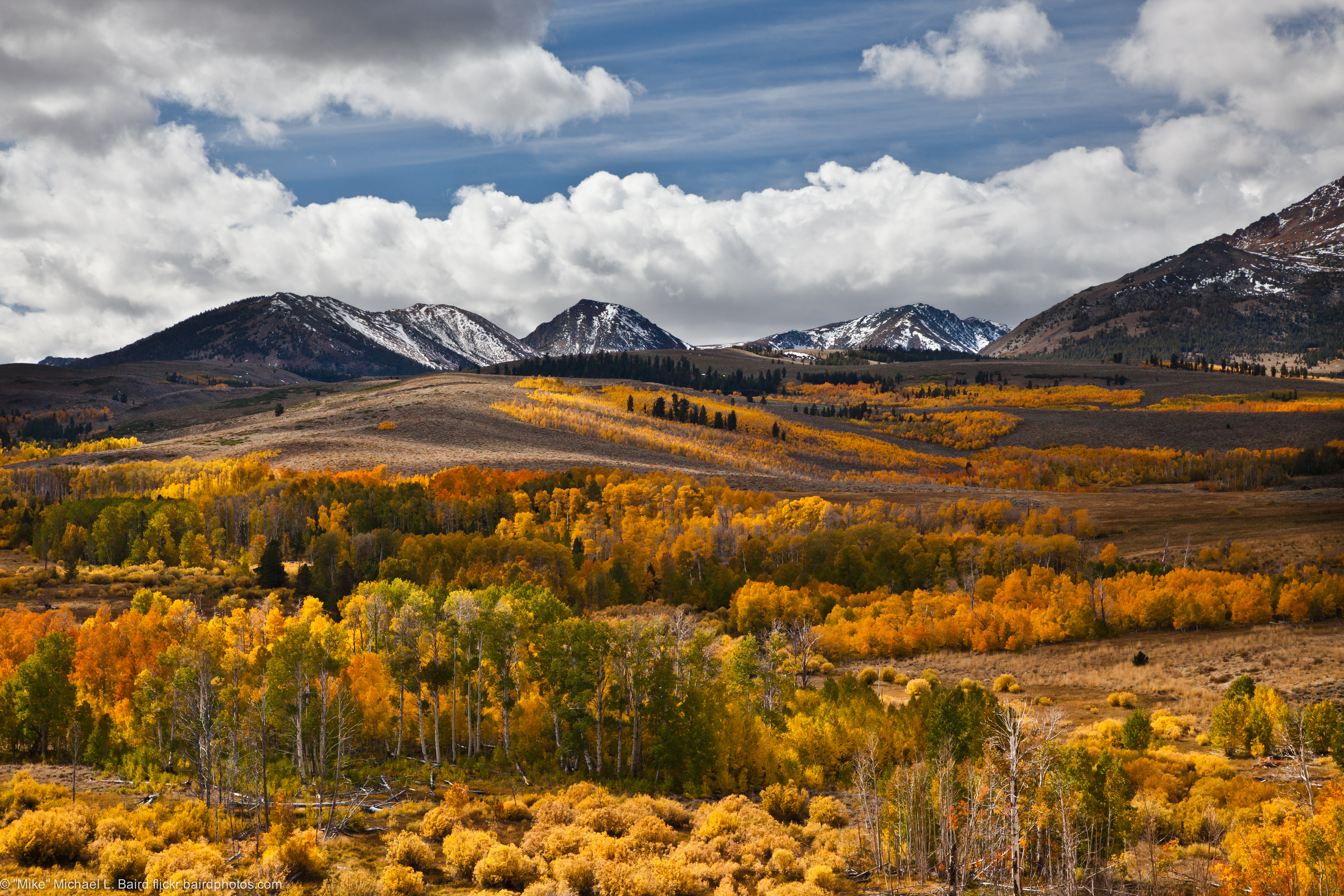
Fall colors from Virginia Lake Road to Conway Summit, 2011

Conway Summit (el. 8,143 feet (2,482 m)) is a mountain pass in Mono County, California. It is traversed by U.S. Highway 395, which connects Bridgeport and the East Walker River on the north side of the pass to Mono Lake and Lee Vining to the south. It marks the highest point on U.S. 395, which also traverses high passes at Deadman Summit and Devil's Gate Pass.

Conway Summit is named after John Andrew Conway, a settler in the area in 1880. Geographically, it was formed from an upland plateau by the sinking of the land in the Mono basin area. The Sawtooth Ridge of the eastern Sierra Nevada, topped by 12,279-foot (3,743 m) Matterhorn Peak, rises to the west of the pass; Green Creek and Virginia Lakes, in the Sierra Nevada to the west of the pass, are two local destinations for fishing, camping and aspen trees. The Bodie Hills and the infamous Bodie ghost town lie to the east.

The Conway Summit Area of Critical Environmental Concern (ACEC), managed by the BLM, "offers some of the most accessible and spectacular fall color viewing areas anywhere in California." The backdrop is formed by 12,000 foot peaks of the Ansel Adams Wilderness and Yosemite National Park.
