= Belford (name) =

Belford is both a surname and a given name. Notable people with the name include:

Surname:

- Cameron Belford (born 1988), English footballer
- Charles Belford (1837–1880), Irish Canadian journalist
- Dale Belford (born 1967), English footballer,
- James B. Belford (1837–1910), American politician
- James Franklin Beatty Belford, Canadian politician
- Joseph M. Belford (1852–1917), American politician
- Ken Belford (1946–2020), Canadian poet

Given name:

- Belford Hendricks (1909–1977), a.k.a. Belford Cabell Hendricks & Belford Clifford Hendricks, American composer, pianist, arranger, conductor and record producer
- Belford Lawson Jr. (1901–1985), American lawyer and activist
- David Belford West (1896–1973), American football player
- Ronald Belford Scott (1946–1980), former singer of AC/DC
