= Little Walker Caldera =

Inactive caldera in the Sierra Nevada in California, United States

Coordinates: 38.3235°N 119.4224°W

Little Walker Caldera is a depression in the eastern Sierra Nevada in California that is adjacent to the Sweetwater Mountains. The caldera is very large, measuring about 11 miles (18 km) in diameter. The caldera is named for the Little Walker River. U.S. Route 395 in California crosses the Northern boundary of the caldera, just west of the Devil's Gate Pass. California State Route 108 follows more of the northern boundary of the caldera.

Little Walker Caldera last produced a major eruption about 9 million years ago. Andesitic lava and tuff from the series of three eruptive events are found several hundred feet thick as far away as Antelope Valley, Mono County, 20 miles (32 km) north, Bridgeport Valley to the south, and Sonora 60 miles (97 km) to the west. The lava flows near Sonora are readily visible from California State Route 108 and followed the gold-laden stream beds in the area. Rich placer gold deposits have been revealed by excavating the ancient stream beds that lie underneath the lava flows.

The Little Walker Caldera is classified as extinct, although it continues to produce substantial hot spring activity and occasional earthquakes.

Some parts of the Little Walker Caldera overlap the northernmost extent of the Yosemite National Park.
