= Belforti =

Belforti is a surname. Notable people with the surname include:

- José Belforti (born 1981), Argentine footballer, twin brother of Martín
- Martín Belforti (born 1981), Argentine footballer

== See also ==
- Belfort (disambiguation)
