= Belford =

Belford may refer to:

== People ==
- Belford (name)

== Places ==
- Belford Historic District, a National Historic District in Georgetown, Texas
- Belford, New Jersey, United States
- Belford, New South Wales, Australia
- Belford, Northumberland, England
  - Belford Hall, an 18th-century mansion house in Belford, Northumberland
- Belford, Ontario, Canada, a former community near Locust Hill, Ontario
- Belford Roxo (Portuguese, "Purple Belfort"), a city in the State of Rio de Janeiro, Brazil

== Other uses ==
- Belford Hospital, locally known as The Belford, a hospital in Fort William, Scotland
- Belford's melidectes (Melidectes belfordi), a bird found in Indonesia and Papua New Guinea
- Belford University, an unaccredited online organization
- Mount Belford, a mountain peak in the U.S. state of Colorado

== See also ==
- Belfort, a city in France
- Belfort (disambiguation)
