= Fales Hot Springs =

Hot spring in California

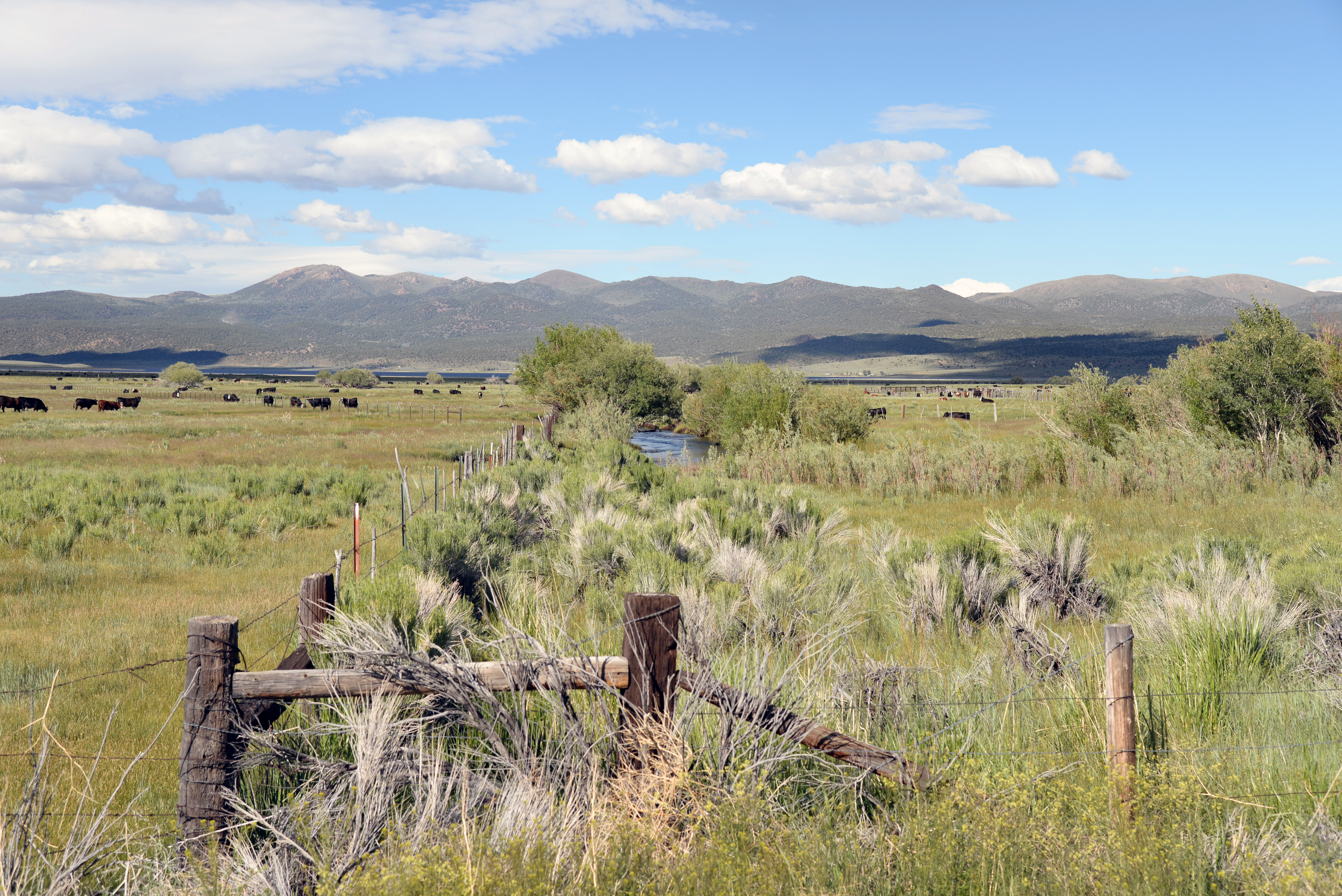
- Fales Hot Springs in 2016
- Interactive map of Fales Hot Springs
- Location: Mono County, California
- Coordinates: 38°21′04″N 119°24′01″W
- Elevation: 7,319 feet (2,231 m)

Fales Hot Springs is a hot spring in the Sonora Junction area of Mono County, eastern California.

The property is privately owned, doubling as a personal residence, and is not open to the public.

It is located in the eastern Sierra Nevada, at an elevation of 7,319 feet (2,231 m).

It is 15 miles (24 km) northwest of Bridgeport on U.S. Route 395.

== History ==
The name honors Samuel Fales (né False, but his name was falsely corrected later), who purchased the natural hot springs in 1863 and developed the site into a resort in 1877. The Fales post office operated for a period during 1881. By 1908, Fales Hot Springs had a stage coach stop and baths using the hot spring water. According to Ella Cain, a resident of Bodie in the 1890s and of Bridgeport in later years, Sam Fales was in the business of telling tall tales to his dinner guests.

According to the records at the Mono County Museum in Bridgeport, Sam Fales transferred control of the facilities to J.M. Mawer in 1908, but lived at the hot springs until his death in 1933 at the age of 104. The resort remained in use under various owners until it exploded in a Butane filling accident in 1952.

The current residence is located about 1/4 mile north of the original stage stop, the resort having been re-constructed in 1954 using the settlement money from the 1952 accident. Only 2 other residences can be seen from the property, in spite of a panoramic vista to the West. Southbound drivers on U.S. Route 395 sometimes stop in Bridgeport to report a fire at the junction, thinking the steam rising from Hot Creek was smoke.

=== Resources ===
Several attempts have been made to exploit the minerals around the Hot Spring without success. Travertine deposits are described as too porous to be usable. Some amount of Uranium was discovered by the DOE, but does not appear to have been mined.

A 413 feet (126 m) deep test well did not yield water hotter than 100 °F (38 °C). The water from the spring is reported as 180 °F (82 °C).
