= U.S. Route 6 in California =

U.S. highway in California

U.S. Route 6
- Grand Army of the Republic Highway
- US 6 highlighted in red

Route information
- Maintained by Caltrans
- Length: 40.505 mi (65.186 km)
- Existed: 1936–present

Major junctions
- West end: US 395 in Bishop
- SR 120 in Benton
- East end: US 6 at Nevada near Montgomery Pass, Nevada

Location
- Country: United States
- State: California
- Counties: Inyo, Mono

Highway system
- United States Numbered Highway System; List; Special; Divided; State highways in California; Interstate; US; State; Scenic; History; Pre‑1964; Unconstructed; Deleted; Freeways
← I-5	→ SR 7

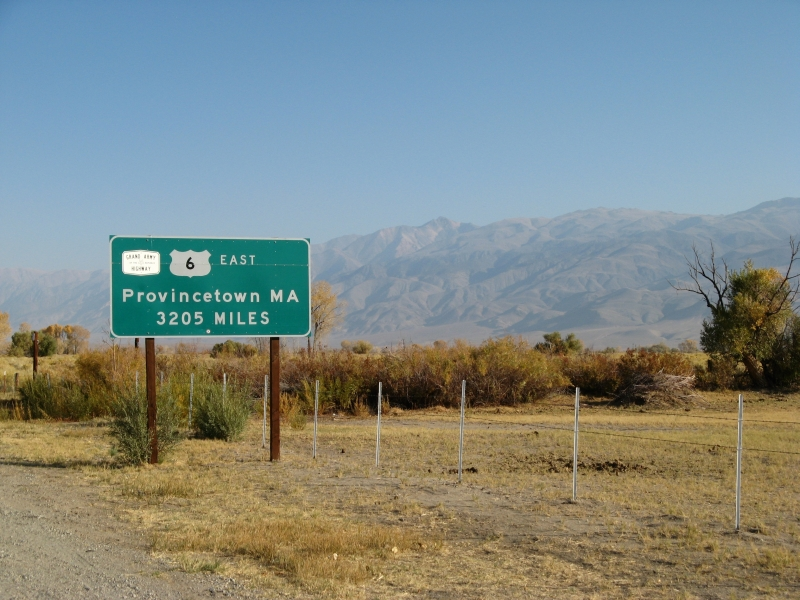
Sign listing the mileage to US 6's eastern end in Massachusetts

U.S. Route 6 (US 6) is a transcontinental United States Numbered Highway, stretching from Bishop, California, in the west to Provincetown, Massachusetts, in the east. The California portion of US 6 lies in the eastern portion of the state, running between Bishop in the Owens Valley to the Nevada state line in Mineral County. Prior to the 1964 state highway renumbering, US 6 extended to the Pacific Ocean in Long Beach, California, as part of the historic auto trail named the Grand Army of the Republic Highway.

== Route description ==
The entire length of US 6 in California is defined in section 306 of the California Streets and Highways Code as simply Route 6, and that the highway is from "Route 395 near Bishop to the Nevada state line near Montgomery Pass." This corresponds with the American Association of State Highway and Transportation Officials (AASHTO)'s U.S. Route logs of US 6. US 6 is part of the California Freeway and Expressway System and is part of the National Highway System, a network of highways that are considered essential to the country's economy, defense, and mobility by the Federal Highway Administration. US 6 is eligible to be included in the State Scenic Highway System, but it is not officially designated as a scenic highway by the California Department of Transportation (Caltrans). The segment of US 6 in California is signed as east–west, as it is in the rest of the nation, despite the route primarily running north–south within the state.

Starting in Inyo County, US 6 begins its route at Bishop at a junction with US 395 near the Bishop Paiute Tribe. After leaving Inyo County and entering Mono County, the highway proceeds due north to the town of Benton and intersects State Route 120 (SR 120). The highway then begins ascending the lower foothills of the White Mountains, toward Montgomery Pass in Nevada. The highway reaches the state line before cresting the pass. While still in California, the highway passes Boundary Peak, the highest point in Nevada.

== History ==
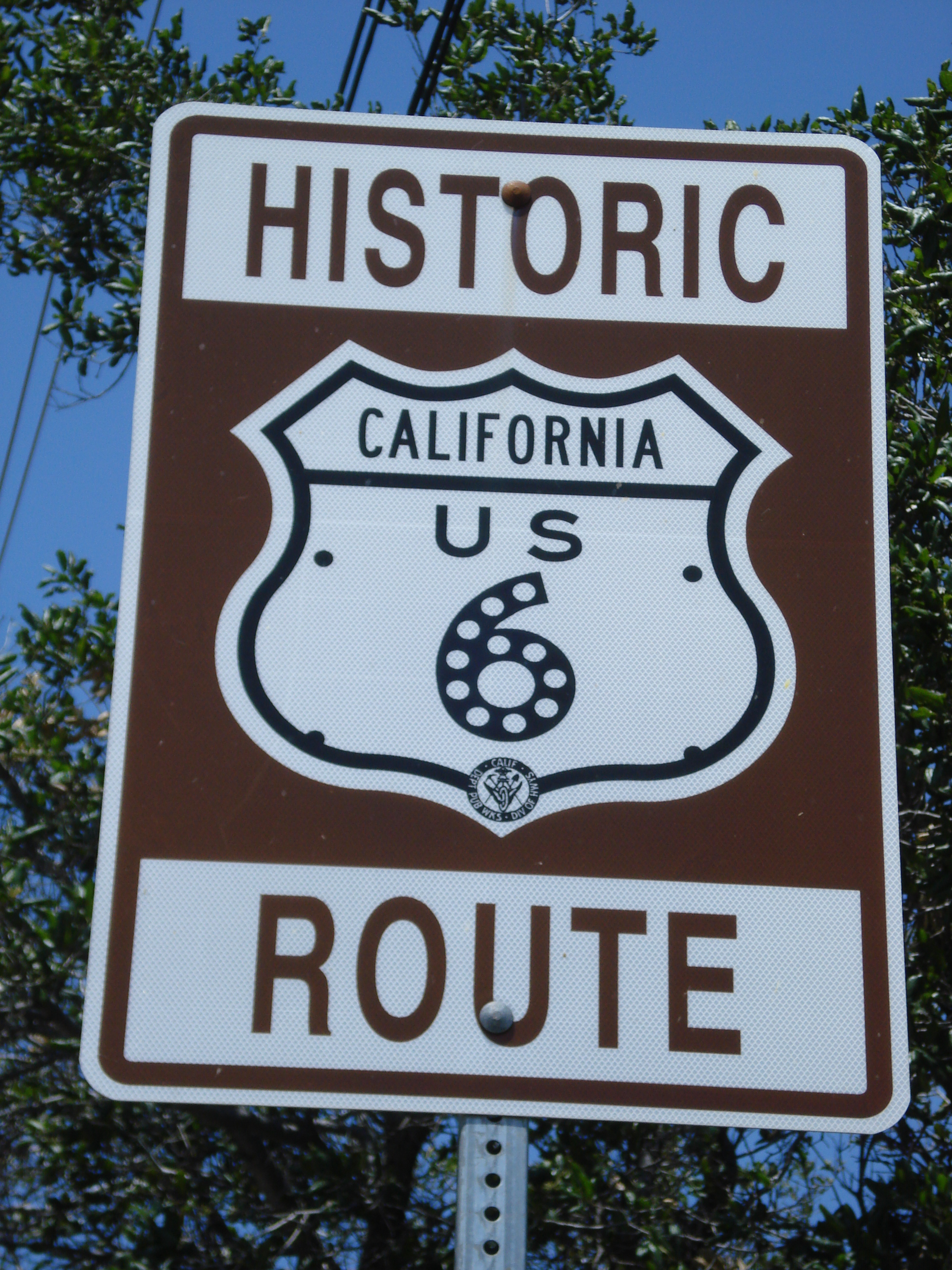
Historic US 6 sign near the southern terminus of Sierra Highway

The California portion of US 6 was originally commissioned in 1937 as an extension of the highway from Greeley, Colorado, as part of the historic Grand Army of the Republic Highway auto trail.

=== Grand Army of the Republic Highway ===
US 6 was later extended further south through the Mojave Desert and Los Angeles to Long Beach in Southern California. It traveled along with what is now US 395, SR 14 (Sierra Highway), I-5, I-110/SR 110, and SR 1. When the Four Level Interchange was constructed, US 6 was the original number for SR 110 at this interchange.

It formerly ran from Long Beach west to San Pedro and continued north on Figueroa Street, briefly concurrent with US 66 in Los Angeles before turning northwest and cosigning with US 99 on San Fernando Road. US 66 continued north on the Arroyo Seco Freeway before also being decommissioned in 1964, leading to the Harbor and Arroyo Seco freeways being redesignated to SR 11, which ran from Gaffey Street in San Pedro to Colorado Boulevard in Pasadena. In 1981, the Harbor Freeway between Gaffey Street and I-10 became I-110, replacing the SR 11 designation. The northern segment of SR 11 continuing to Glenarm Street became SR 110, which continues briefly as the Harbor Freeway before becoming the Pasadena Freeway north of the Four Level Interchange with US 101.

=== Renumbering ===
In 1964, all the route of US 6 in California south of Bishop lost official status with its US 6 signs removed. The highway was truncated to Bishop as part of the 1964 state highway renumbering. In 2007, the state legislature recognized the decommissioned segment as Historic US 6 and approved the placement of Historic US 6 signage along the old alignment.

== Major intersections ==
Except where prefixed with a letter, postmiles were measured on the road as it was in 1964, based on the alignment that existed at the time, and do not necessarily reflect current mileage. R reflects a realignment in the route since then, M indicates a second realignment, L refers to an overlap due to a correction or change, and T indicates postmiles classified as temporary. Segments that remain unconstructed or have been relinquished to local control may be omitted. The numbers reset at county lines; the start and end postmiles in each county are given in the county column.

County	Location	Postmile	Destinations	Notes
Inyo; INY R0.00-8.35	Bishop	0.00	US 395 – Los Angeles, Reno	No left turn from US 395 south to US 6; national western terminus; US 395 south is former US 6 south
Inyo; INY R0.00-8.35	Bishop	0.13	Wye Road to US 395 north – Reno	Alternative route from US 395 south to US 6
Mono; MNO 0.00-32.29	Benton	25.72	SR 120 – Lee Vining, Yosemite National Park	
Mono; MNO 0.00-32.29		27.30	Agricultural Inspection Station (westbound only)	
Mono; MNO 0.00-32.29		32.29	US 6 east – Tonopah	Continuation into Nevada
1.000 mi = 1.609 km; 1.000 km = 0.621 mi: Incomplete access

== See also ==
- Midland Trail
- Category: Historic trails and roads in California

U.S. Route 6
Previous state: Terminus	California	Next state: Nevada
