= Belfort, California =

Unincorporated community in California, United States

Belfort
- Former mining camp
- Location in California Belfort (the United States)
- Coordinates: 38°24′59″N 119°16′02″W
- Country: United States
- State: California
- County: Mono
- Established: 1880s
- Elevation: 10,210 ft (3,112 m)

Belfort was a mining camp in the 1880s. It was located 8.5 miles (14 km) east-northeast of Fales Hot Springs, at an elevation of 10210 feet (3112 m) in the Sweetwater Mountains of Mono County, California, United States.

Mining activity for silver and gold continued into the 1890s.
