= Belfort (disambiguation) =

Belfort is a town and commune in France.

Belfort may also refer to:

== Locations ==
=== Europe ===
- Belfry of Bruges, a bell-tower in Bruges, Belgium
- Belfort, Kuyavian-Pomeranian Voivodeship, a village in north-central Poland
- Belfort, Pomeranian Voivodeship, a village in north Poland
- Belfort-du-Quercy, Lot, France
- Belfort-sur-Rebenty, Aude, France
- Belfort Castle, a ruined castle in Brienz/Brinzauls, Switzerland

=== Middle East ===
- Deir Abu Mash'al, the Crusader name for a Palestinian village
- Beaufort Castle, Lebanon, also known as Belfort Castle

=== United States ===
- Belfort, California, a community in Mono County, California
- Belfort, Ohio, an unincorporated community

== People ==
- Belfort Duarte, a Brazilian football player
- Prêmio Belfort Duarte, a football award
- Edward Belfort (1965–2025), Surinamese politician
- Jordan Belfort, an American author and motivational speaker
- Nadine Belfort, American psychologist and former wife of Jordan Belfort
- Vitor Belfort, a Brazilian mixed martial arts fighter

== Other ==
- Belfort (game), a 2011 board game
- Het Belfort, a Dutch-language literary magazine, now published as DWB

== See also ==
- Belford (disambiguation)
