= Ken Belford =

Canadian poet (1946–2020)

Ken Belford (1946–2020) was a Canadian poet.

Belford was born in DeBolt, Alberta, and grew up in East Vancouver. As a young man, he worked on the log booms of the British Columbia lower mainland, and as a lumber piler in the sawmill camps of the interior. In the 1960s, he moved to Hazelton, British Columbia, in traditional Gitxsan territory. For 35 years, as one of the first eco-tourism guides in the province, he guided world travelers in the pristine Damdochax Valley in the vicinity of the headwaters of the Nass River.

Later, Belford moved to Prince George, British Columbia, where he lived with his partner, the artist, educator, and activist poet, Si Transken.

Belford was active in Canadian poetry from the 1960s.

Belford died on February 19, 2020.

== Publications ==
- Fireweed, Vancouver. BC. Talonbooks, 1967
- The Post Electric Caveman, Very Stone House, 1970
- Pathways into the Mountains, Caitlin, 2000. ISBN 0-920576-84-2
- Ecologue, Harbour, Madeira Park, BC, 2005. ISBN 1-55017-349-9
- When Snakes Awaken, Nomados, Vancouver, 2006
- Lan(d)guage, Half Moon Bay, Caitlin, 2008.
- Decompositions, Vancouver, BC. Talonbooks, 2010. ISBN 978-0-88922-631-9
- Internodes, Talonbooks, Vancouver, BC, 2013. ISBN 978-0-88922-792-7
- Slick Reckoning, Talonbooks, Vancouver, BC, 2016. ISBN 978-0-88922-978-5
