= Sherwin Summit =

Mountain pass in the Sierra Nevada of California

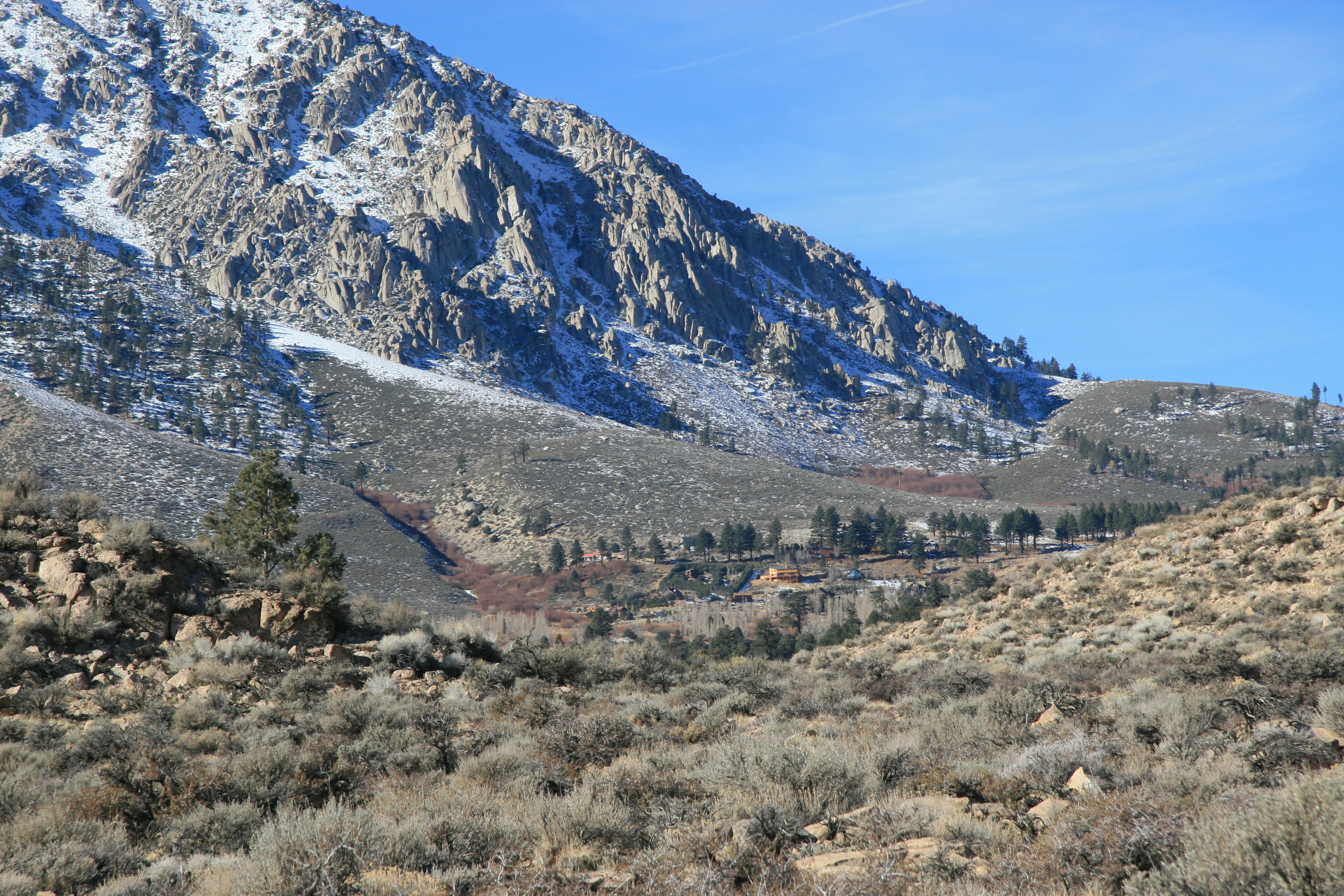

- Location within California
- Elevation: 6,427 feet (1,959 m)
- Traversed by: US 395

Third Approach
- Location: Mono County, California, US
- Range: Sierra Nevada
- Coordinates: 37°30′52″N 118°37′40″W
- Topo map: USGS Toms Place

Sherwin Summit (el. 6,427 feet, 1,959 m) is a mountain pass on U.S. Highway 395.

It is located east of Tom's Place and Crowley Lake in the eastern part of the Sierra Nevada range. South of the summit, the road starts on its long 2,400 foot (610 m) descent into the 4,000 ft (1,200 m) high Owens Valley. The Owens River generally follows the road from this summit through the Owens Valley. Motorists who come from the south usually cross this summit in order to go to the high-altitude towns like Mammoth Lakes to the northwest to escape the smothering summer heat in the deserts. The pass receives snowfall during the winter, although the region receives relatively little precipitation annually.

The 1946 film My Pal Trigger was filmed here.

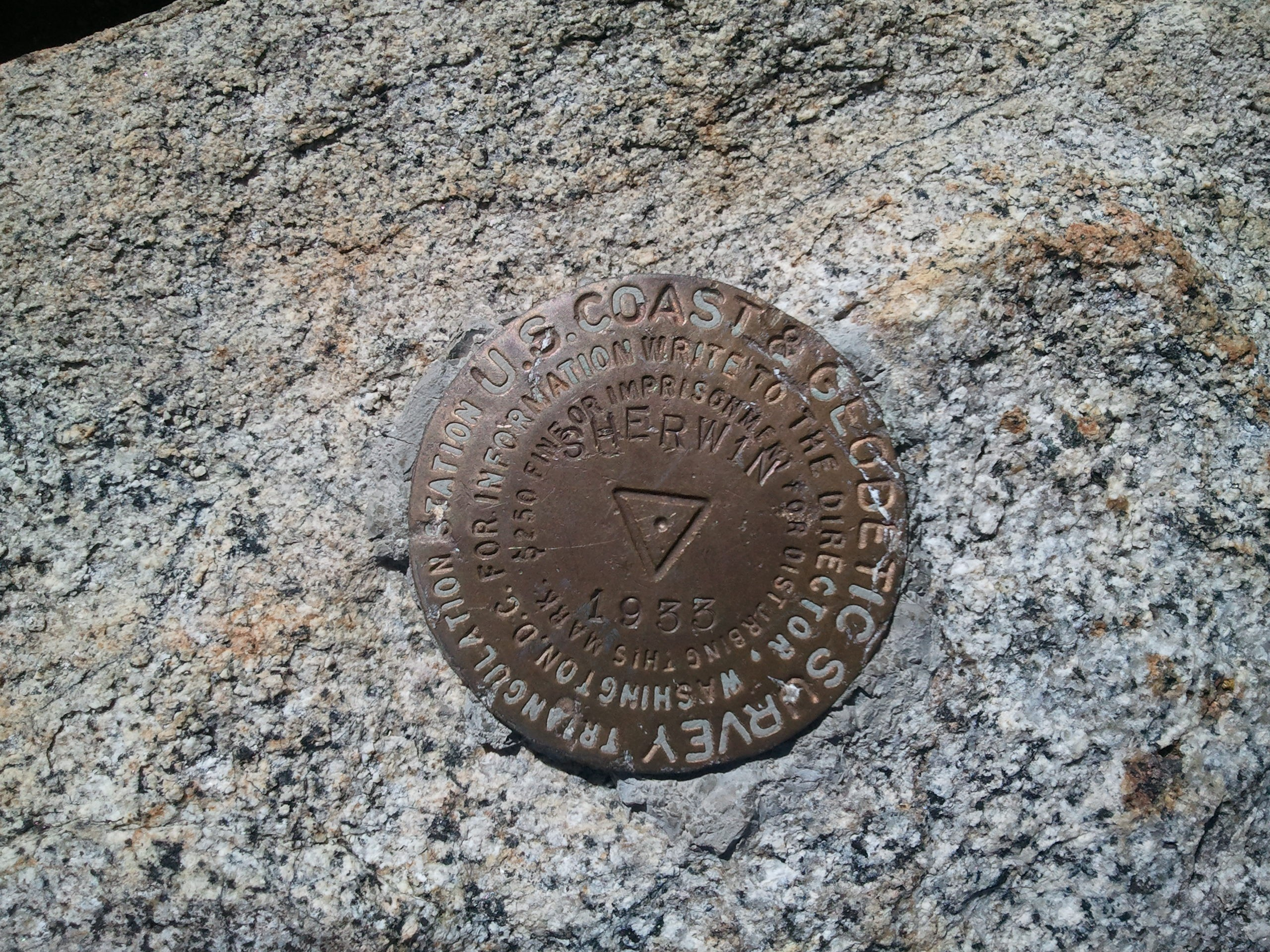
U.S. Coast & Geodetic Survey plaque on Sherwin Summit
