= Charles Belford =

Canadian publisher from Ireland (1837–1880)

Charles Belford (April 25, 1837 – December 19, 1880) was a journalist and publisher from County Cork, Ireland.

Belford came to Canada with two younger brothers in 1857 and later they formed Belford Brothers publishing. Since there was no international copyright agreement at the time, they took advantage of the Canadian Copyright Act of 1875 to reprint many authors, most notably Mark Twain, when it was legal to do so; the unauthorized editions were then sold in the United States as well as Canada. Twain estimated that the Belford Brothers' edition of The Adventures of Tom Sawyer alone had cost him ten thousand dollars.

The company was successful and eventually was absorbed into the Rand McNally Company after Charles had left.
