= U.S. Route 395 in California =

Highway in California

U.S. Route 395
- US 395 highlighted in red

Route information
- Maintained by Caltrans
- Length: 556.909 mi (896.258 km)
- Existed: 1930s–present
- Tourist routes: Portions of US 395 in Inyo and Mono counties

Southern segment
- Length: 354 mi (570 km)
- South end: I-15 in Hesperia
- Major intersections: SR 18 at the Victorville–Adelanto line; SR 58 in Kramer Junction; SR 14 near Ridgecrest; SR 168 in Big Pine; US 6 in Bishop; SR 120 in Lee Vining; SR 89 near Coleville
- North end: US 395 at the Nevada state line in Topaz Lake, NV

Northern segment
- Length: 202 mi (325 km)
- South end: US 395 at the Nevada state line near Cold Springs, NV
- Major intersections: SR 70 at Hallelujah Junction; SR 36 near Susanville; SR 299 in Alturas
- North end: US 395 at the Oregon state line in New Pine Creek, OR

Location
- Country: United States
- State: California
- Counties: San Bernardino, Kern, Inyo, Mono; Sierra, Lassen, Modoc

Highway system
- United States Numbered Highway System; List; Special; Divided; State highways in California; Interstate; US; State; Scenic; History; Pre‑1964; Unconstructed; Deleted; Freeways
← I-380	→ US 399

U.S. Route 395 (US 395) is a United States Numbered Highway, stretching from Hesperia, California to the Canadian border in Laurier, Washington. The California portion of US 395 is a 557-mile (896 km) route which traverses from Interstate 15 (I-15) in Hesperia, north to the Oregon state line in Modoc County near Goose Lake. The route clips into Nevada, serving the cities Carson City and Reno, before returning to California.

Prior to truncation, US 395 served the metropolitan areas of San Diego, Riverside, and San Bernardino. The highway serves as a connection to the Greater Los Angeles area for the communities of the Owens Valley, Mammoth Lakes and Mono Lake. The highway is used as an access route for both the highest point in the contiguous United States, Mount Whitney, and the lowest point in North America, Death Valley.

The corridor has been used since the California gold rush, and before numbering was known by several names including El Camino Sierra.

== Route description ==
The two non-contiguous segments of US 395 in California are defined in section 610 of the California Streets and Highways Code as simply Route 395:

Route 395 is from:
(a) Route 15 near Cajon Pass to the Nevada state line passing near Little Lake, Independence, Bridgeport, and Coleville.
(b) Nevada state line northwest of Reno to the Oregon state line near New Pine Creek via Alturas.

This definition corresponds with the American Association of State Highway and Transportation Officials (AASHTO)'s U.S. Route logs of US 395.

US 395 is part of the California Freeway and Expressway System, and part of the National Highway System, a network of highways that are considered essential to the country's economy, defense, and mobility by the Federal Highway Administration. US 395 is eligible to be included in the State Scenic Highway System, and is officially designated as a scenic highway by the California Department of Transportation from Fort Independence to Fort Springs Road in Inyo County, and from the Inyo–Mono county line to south of Walker. This designation means that there are substantial sections of highway passing through a "memorable landscape" with no "visual intrusions", where the potential designation has gained popular favor with the community.

The Eastern Sierra Transit Authority provides transit service along the southern segment of the 395 in California.

=== Mojave Desert ===
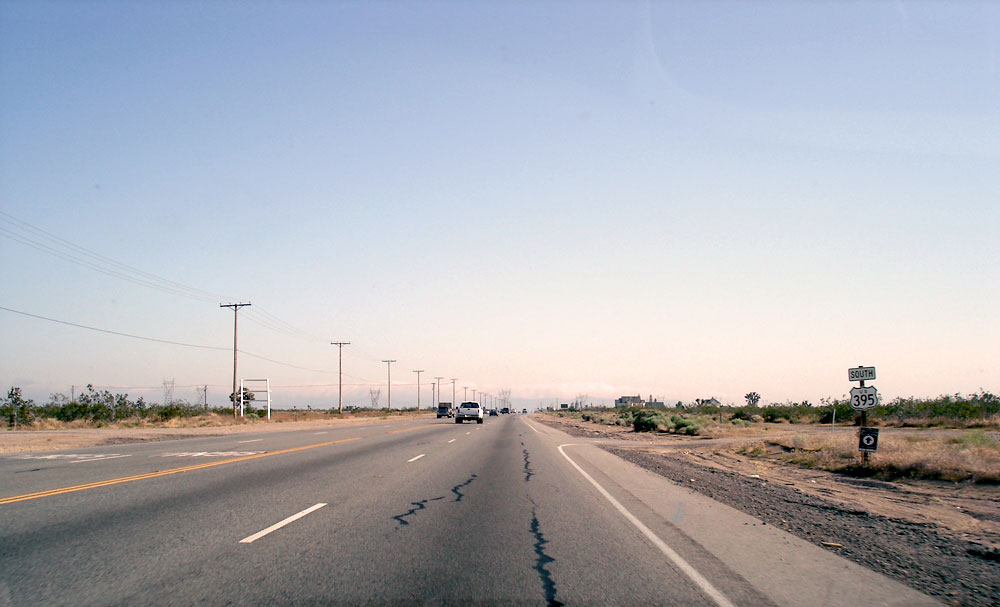
US 395 in the Mojave Desert near Victorville

US 395 begins in Hesperia at a partial interchange with I-15 as it heads north. The road then enters Adelanto, on the western edge of Victorville. Victorville, founded by the Santa Fe Railroad to take advantage of water along the Mojave River, and for most of its history home to George Air Force Base, was the second fastest growing city in the United States from July 2006 to July 2007. Although US 395 was once a rural road passing to the side of these cities, with growth these cities are encroaching on the highway and changing its character from rural to suburban. After leaving the Victorville area, the scenery changes as suburban neighborhoods disappear and the highway traverses the Mojave Desert. While crossing the desert, the route clips the northeastern corner of Edwards Air Force Base. Just past the base, the road intersects State Route 58 (SR 58) at Kramer Junction. This was formerly an at-grade intersection; however, SR 58 was rerouted onto a new freeway alignment on October 24, 2019.

After leaving Kramer Junction, US 395 passes the Kramer Junction Solar Electric Generating Station. It then crosses the Rand and El Paso Mountains, where the highway crosses from San Bernardino County into Kern County, near Johannesburg. While traversing these mountains, the route crosses a former Southern Pacific rail line, now owned by the Union Pacific Railroad (UP) that loosely follows the route of SR 14 through the Mojave. Though the railroad is abandoned north of Searles Station, US 395 parallels the old railroad grade from this point to Lone Pine.

On the other side of the mountains is Indian Wells Valley. US 395 passes between the cities of Ridgecrest and Inyokern, where US 395 Business is routed on South China Lake Boulevard. US 395 follows the western boundary of the Naval Air Weapons Station China Lake, not far from Big and Little Petroglyph Canyons, where the Coso People created prolific rock art and traded with distant tribes using tools crafted of stone. The highway proceeds diagonally across the valley, until merging with SR 14. Prior to July 1, 1964, the part of SR 14 between I-5 and US 395 was part of US 6 that continued south to Long Beach.

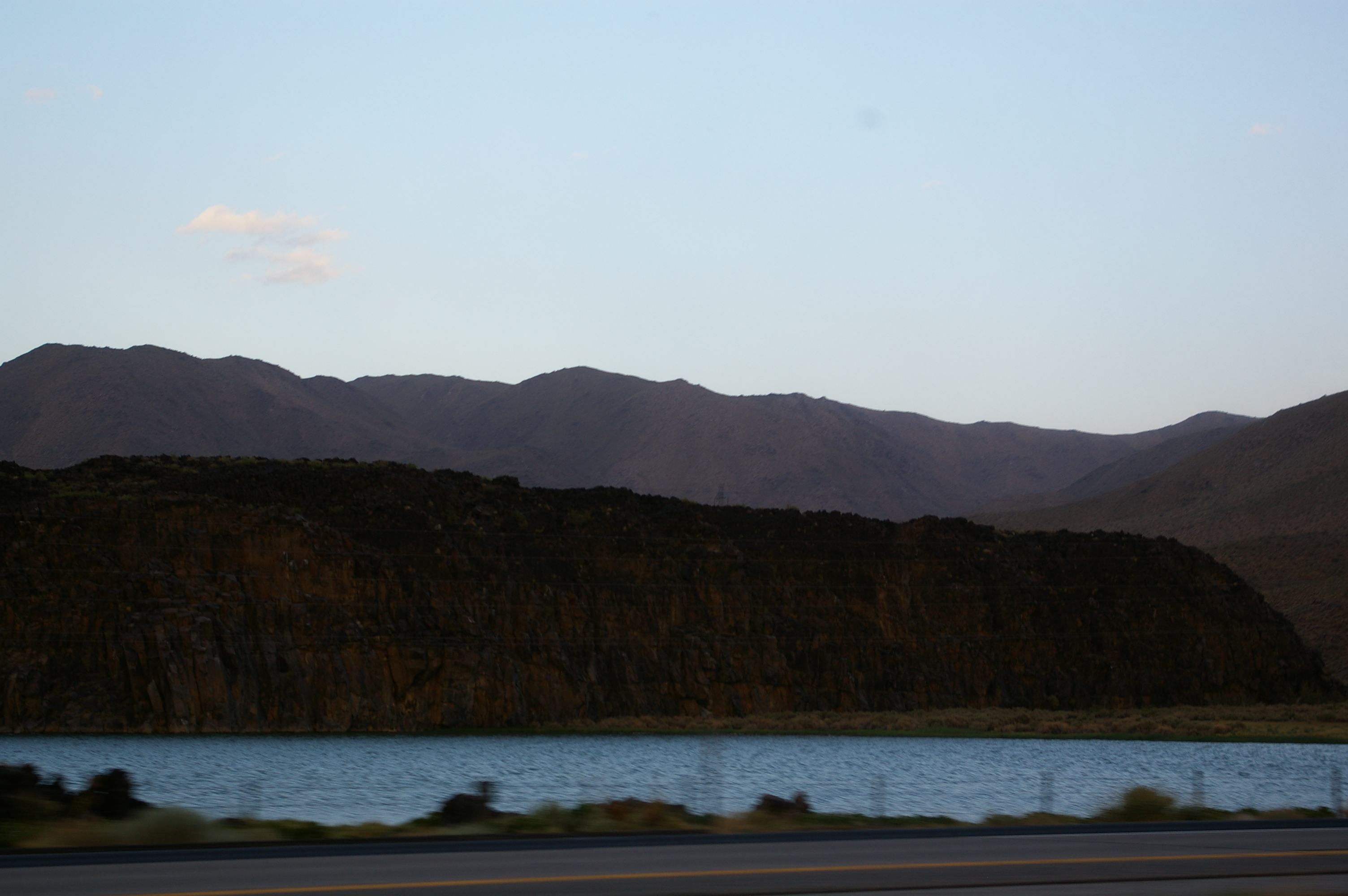
Volcanic rock above Little Lake, as seen from US 395

Between Mojave and its junction with US 395, SR 14 follows the edge of the Sierra Nevada mountains. Formerly, US 6 and US 395 ran concurrently from this junction north to Bishop. US 395 follows the valleys along the eastern edge of the Sierra Nevada as the mountains gradually increase in altitude until reaching their peak at over 14,000 feet (4,300 m) near Lone Pine. After passing by three small lakes, Little Lake and North and South Haiwee Reservoirs, the highway enters the Owens Valley.

=== Owens Valley ===
US 395 traverses the entire length of the Owens Valley, entering the valley near the former site of the Owens Lake. The valley, named for one of explorer John C. Fremont's guides, was primarily home to the Timbisha and Paiute peoples before European settlement. Formerly a fertile lake and valley, Owens Lake and the southern portion of the valley are now dry. Water from the valley is channeled for use by the City of Los Angeles, via the Los Angeles Aqueduct, which was constructed during what is commonly called the California Water Wars. Along the shores of Owens Lake, the highway passes by Cartago and Olancha. Just north of the lake is Lone Pine. Lone Pine is noted as an access for both the highest point in the contiguous United States, Mount Whitney, and the lowest point in North America, Badwater Basin in Death Valley. Both Mount Whitney and the mountains surrounding Death Valley are visible from US 395. From Lone Pine to Bishop, the US 395 corridor loosely follows another abandoned rail line, the Carson and Colorado Railroad, although for most of this run the rail line runs on the eastern edge of the valley, while the road mostly runs on the west edge. The US 395 corridor from Lone Pine north to the Nevada state line is noted for a high concentration of natural hot springs leading to the area being known as the "hot springs jackpot".

Past Lone Pine, the highway passes by Manzanar National Historic Site, a concentration camp where Japanese Americans were imprisoned during World War II. The next community is Independence, the county seat of Inyo County and the home to the Eastern California Museum. Just north is the small Fort Independence Indian Reservation and the Tinemaha Reservoir. Nearby is where the Los Angeles Aqueduct is tapped from the Owens River; with more vegetation visible north of this point. In this portion of the valley is Big Pine and the Big Pine Indian Reservation. From here to Bishop the highway is overlapped with SR 168.

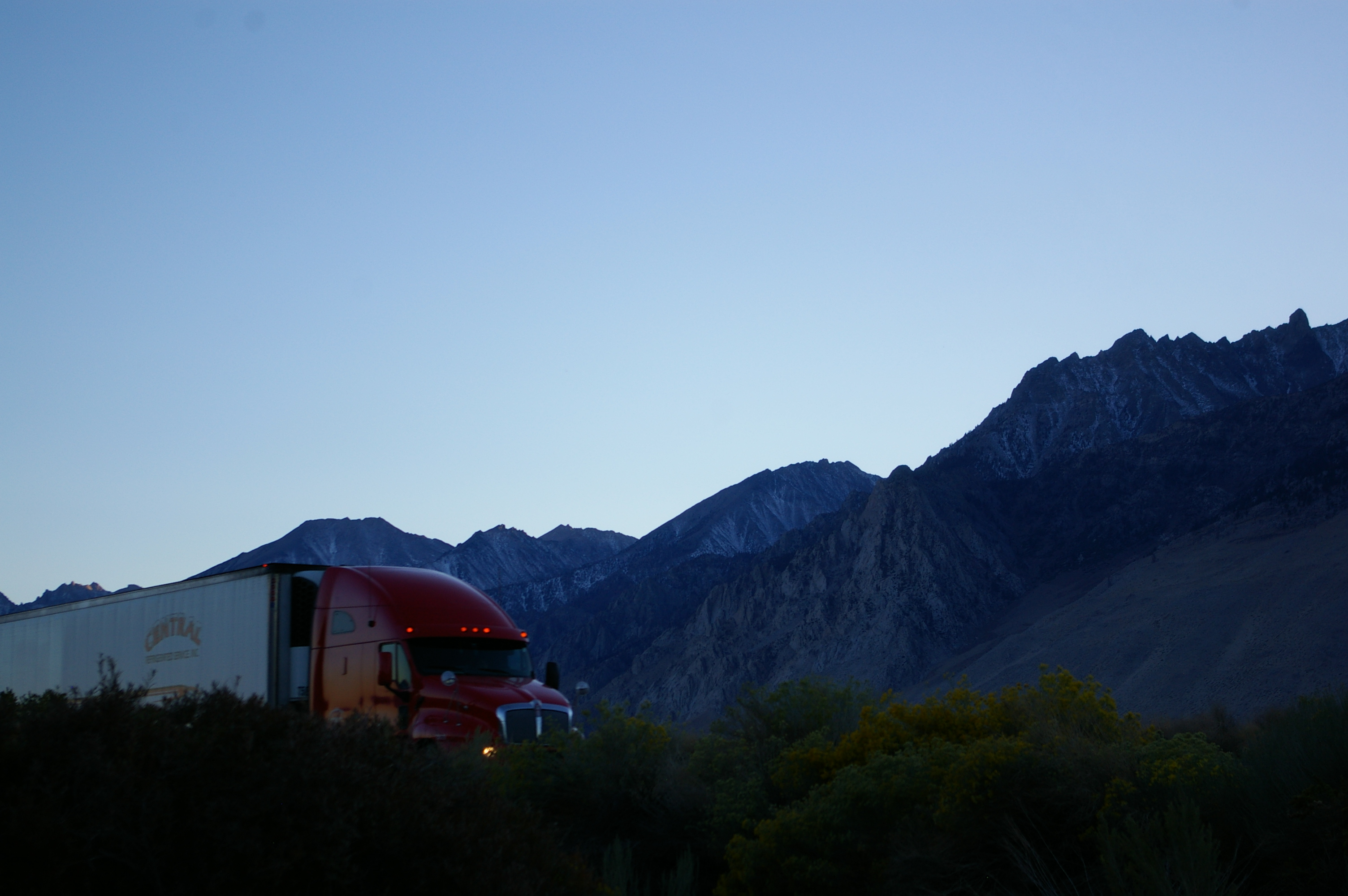
Truck passing through Owens Valley with the Sierra Nevada in the background

At the north end of the valley sits Bishop, the largest city in the Owens Valley. Bishop serves as a gateway for the recreation areas of the Sierra Nevada, including Mammoth Mountain. At the north end of Bishop is the former separation with, and current terminus of, US 6, a 3,205-mile (5,158 km) route which travels eastward across the US to Provincetown, Massachusetts on the east coast. This point is also where US 395 departs from former rail corridors, with the former Carson and Colorado grade following the modern US 6 corridor towards Hawthorne and Tonopah, Nevada. The scenery changes dramatically past Bishop as the highway reaches the end of the valley and with a single ascent, gains over 3,000 feet (910 m) in elevation. From here to Gardnerville, the highway is routed across spur ranges of the Sierra Nevada mountains.

=== Sierra Nevada ===
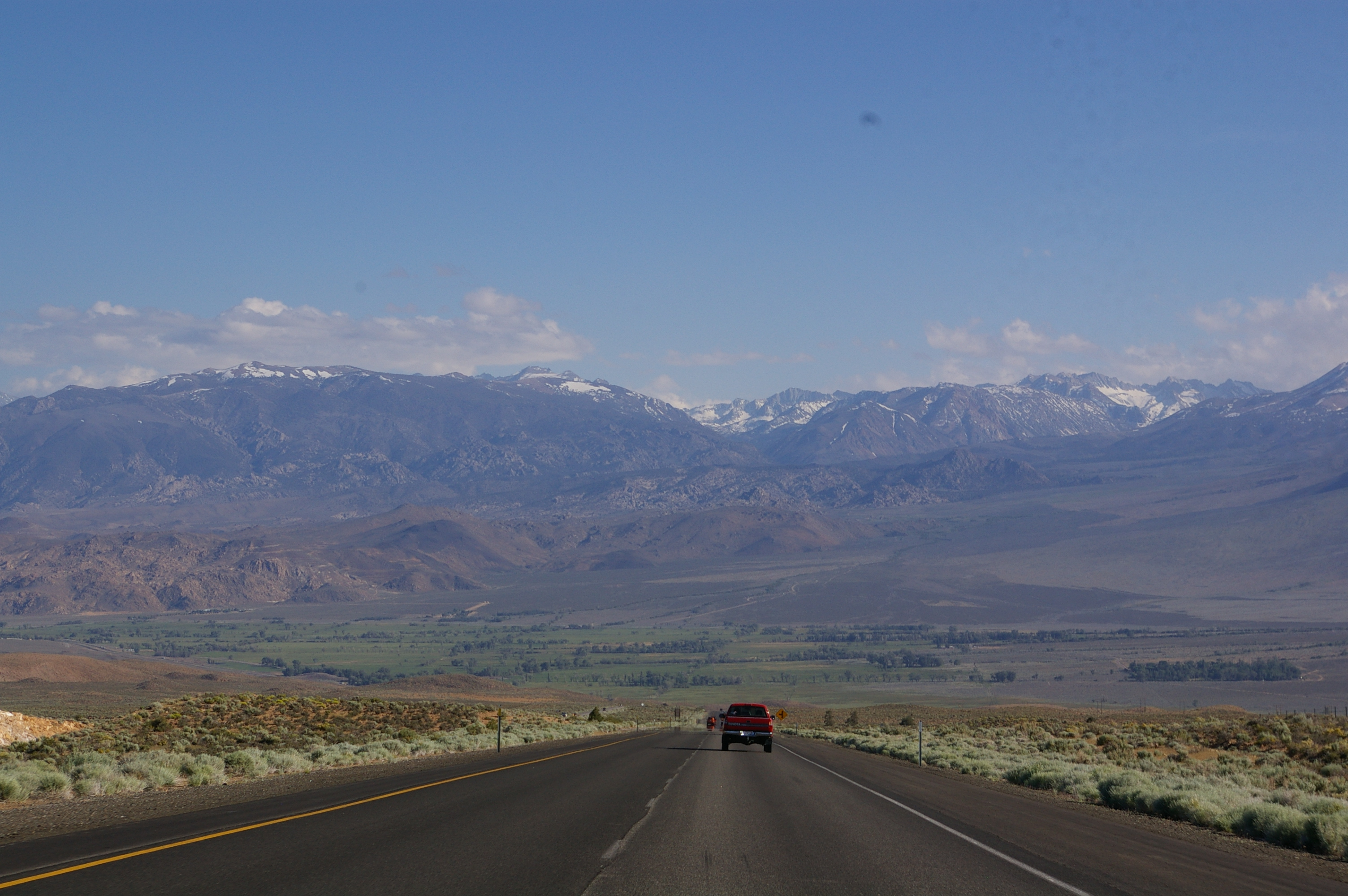
US 395 descending into Owens Valley from the Sierra Nevada, just north of Bishop

US 395 scales the Sierra Nevada on a ridge between the canyons of the Owens River and Rock Creek. Sherwin Summit, at 7,000 feet (2,100 m), is the first of five mountain passes crossed by US 395 in the Sierra Nevada. The highway enters Mono County midway up the ascent, which is known as the Sherwin Grade.

After cresting Sherwin Summit, the highway travels along the west shore of Crowley Lake. Crowley Lake is a reservoir for the Los Angeles aqueduct, which is supplied by the Owens River. However, US 395 does not resume following the river, instead cutting across the Long Valley Caldera to serve the ski resort areas of Mammoth Lakes and Mammoth Mountain via SR 203, after paralleling the runway of the Mammoth Yosemite Airport.

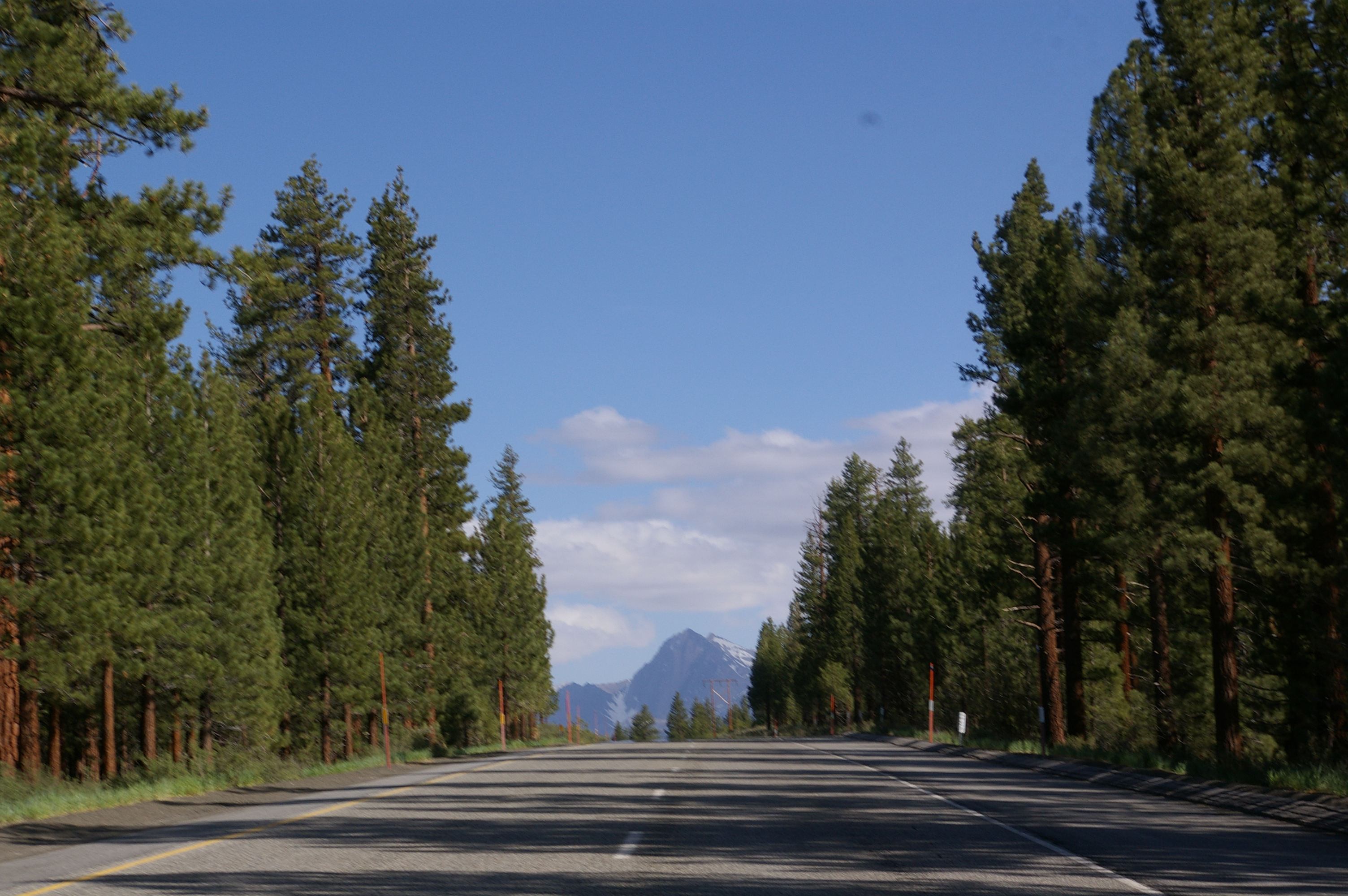
Southbound US 395 cresting Deadman Summit with Mount Morrison in the distance

Eight miles (13 km) past the junction leading to Mammoth, the highway crests the second summit, Deadman Summit, at 8,036 feet (2,449 m). This summit separates the Owens River watershed from that of Mono Lake, a salt lake approximately three times as salty as the ocean.

Along the descent towards Mono Lake, the highway passes near the community of June Lake, a recreation area where there are several freshwater lakes famous for trout fishing, and the June Mountain Ski Area. The June Lake area is served from June Lake Junction by the June Lake Loop Road (SR 158).

Just before arriving at Mono Lake, US 395 has a brief concurrency with SR 120; the two routes separate at the southern end of Lee Vining. At this junction US 395 is 12 miles (19 km) from Tioga Pass, along SR 120, the highest paved through route in California, and the eastern boundary of Yosemite National Park.

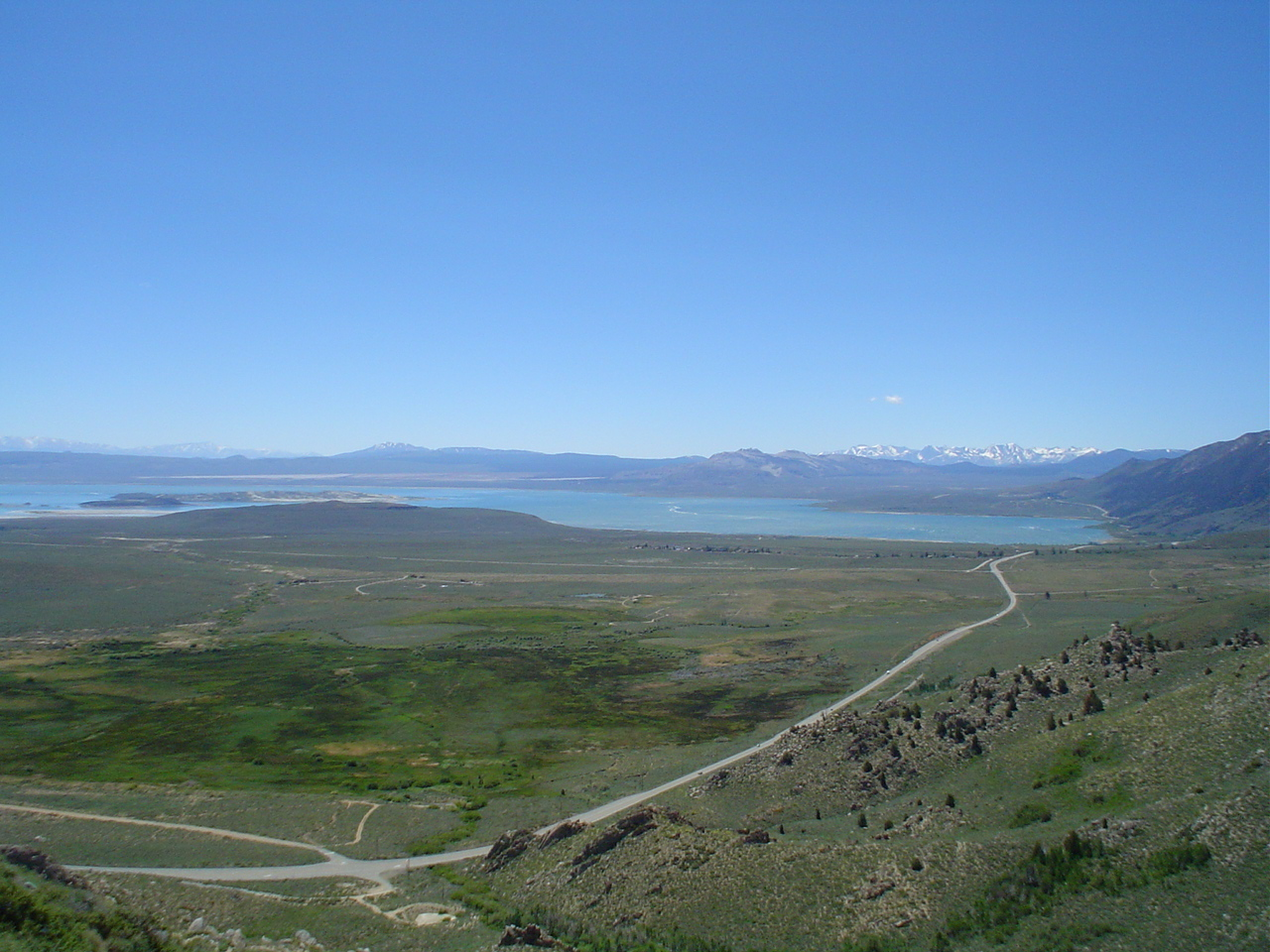
View of US 395 and Mono Lake from Conway Summit

Visible for miles, the highway finally passes Mono Lake, squeezed between the lake and the Sierra crest. The next geographic feature is Conway Summit. At 8,138 feet (2,480 m) in altitude, this is the highest point along US 395, and the highest point along a U.S. Highway in California. This Summit also separates the Mono Lake watershed from that of the East Walker River.

The highway descends Conway Summit via the tributaries of the East Walker River, heading towards Bridgeport and Bridgeport Reservoir. Along the descent the highway passes by a turnoff to Bodie, a ghost town which the state park system has preserved, including items still on the shelves in the abandoned stores.

The fourth summit crossed by US 395 in California is Devil's Gate Pass, elevation 7,519 feet (2,292 m), which separates the East and West Walker Rivers. The winding descent from Devil's Gate follows the West Walker River, exiting near the towns of Walker and Coleville in the Antelope Valley, a few miles south of Topaz Lake which is on the California-Nevada State Line.

=== Nevada ===
Topaz Lake is where US 395 leaves California, to serve the Reno and Carson City metropolitan areas before returning to California. The highway runs for 87 miles (140 km) in Nevada, with a significant portion built to freeway standards and co-designated Interstate 580. When the highway passes from California to Nevada it is near the area where the larger Sierra Nevada in California separates from the Pine Nut Mountains of Nevada. The highway crosses one more pass, Simee Dimeh Summit, before completely exiting the mountains. The highway returns to California following the receding escarpment of the Sierra.

=== Honey Lake ===
US 395 returns to California as a freeway, but is soon downgraded to a divided highway just past the state line. The road follows Long Valley Creek along the edge of the Sierra towards Honey Lake. From this point north, the highway follows a rail line originally built by the Nevada-California-Oregon Railway; the line is now owned by the Union Pacific Railroad.

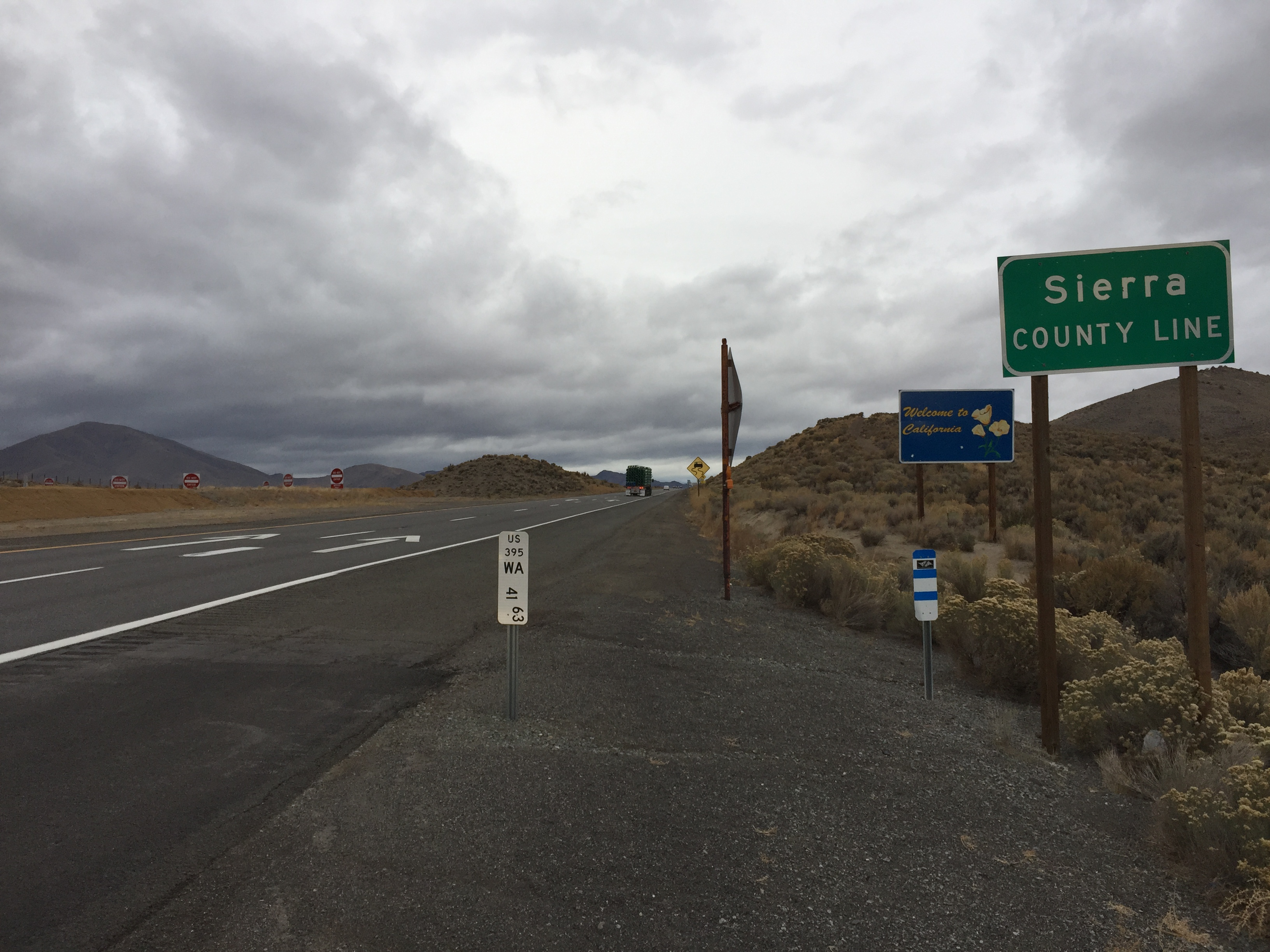
Northbound US 395 entering Sierra County, California from Nevada

The highway enters the state in a corner of Sierra County, entering Lassen County just 3 miles (4.8 km) later. A short segment in Lassen County is a freeway with one exit serving SR 70 at the Hallelujah Junction. This exit is numbered 8, even though it resides hundreds of miles from the origin of the highway; the exit number instead uses the distance from the point of re-entry to California. Though SR 70 does not directly serve any major cities, the highway is noted as an all-weather crossing of the Sierras. Just less than 5 miles (8.0 km) from Hallelujah Junction is Beckwourth Pass, the lowest pass in the Sierra, used by both SR 70 and the Feather River Route. SR 70 was at one time numbered U.S. Route 40 Alternate, using US 395 from this junction south to Reno to connect with the mainline US 40 (now I-80). Though using US 40 ALT and US 395 is a much longer route between Reno and Sacramento than mainline US-40 (130 miles (210 km) versus 226 miles (364 km)), the alternate route was more likely to be open during winter storms than US 40, which crested the Sierra at Donner Pass.

The highway proceeds towards and around the west side of 73-square-mile (190 km^{2}) Honey Lake while en route to Susanville. Although Susanville is used as a control city, US 395 does not technically enter the city. In a T-intersection with SR 36 just before Susanville, US 395 makes a sharp turn avoiding the city, making a near complete loop around the Susanville Municipal Airport.

=== Modoc Plateau ===
North of Susanville, the highway bends around Shaffer Mountain and crosses the Modoc Plateau. While en route, the highway serves the towns of Ravendale, Termo, and Madeline in Lassen County, as well as Likely in Modoc County. Here US 395 parallels the South Fork of the Pit River until the confluence with the north fork in Alturas. Past the confluence, the highway follows North Fork Pit River across Modoc County toward Goose Lake. The last junction in California is with SR 299, former U.S. Route 299, in Alturas. SR 299 can be used to travel west all the way to the western side of California at US 101 in Arcata, and east to Nevada State Route 8A at the Nevada state line. The two highways are briefly concurrent from Alturas to the XL Ranch Indian Reservation. US 395 travels in a north-northeast direction for the last 50 miles (80 km) in California, paralleling the east shore of Goose Lake just before crossing the Oregon state line at New Pine Creek, Oregon.

== History ==
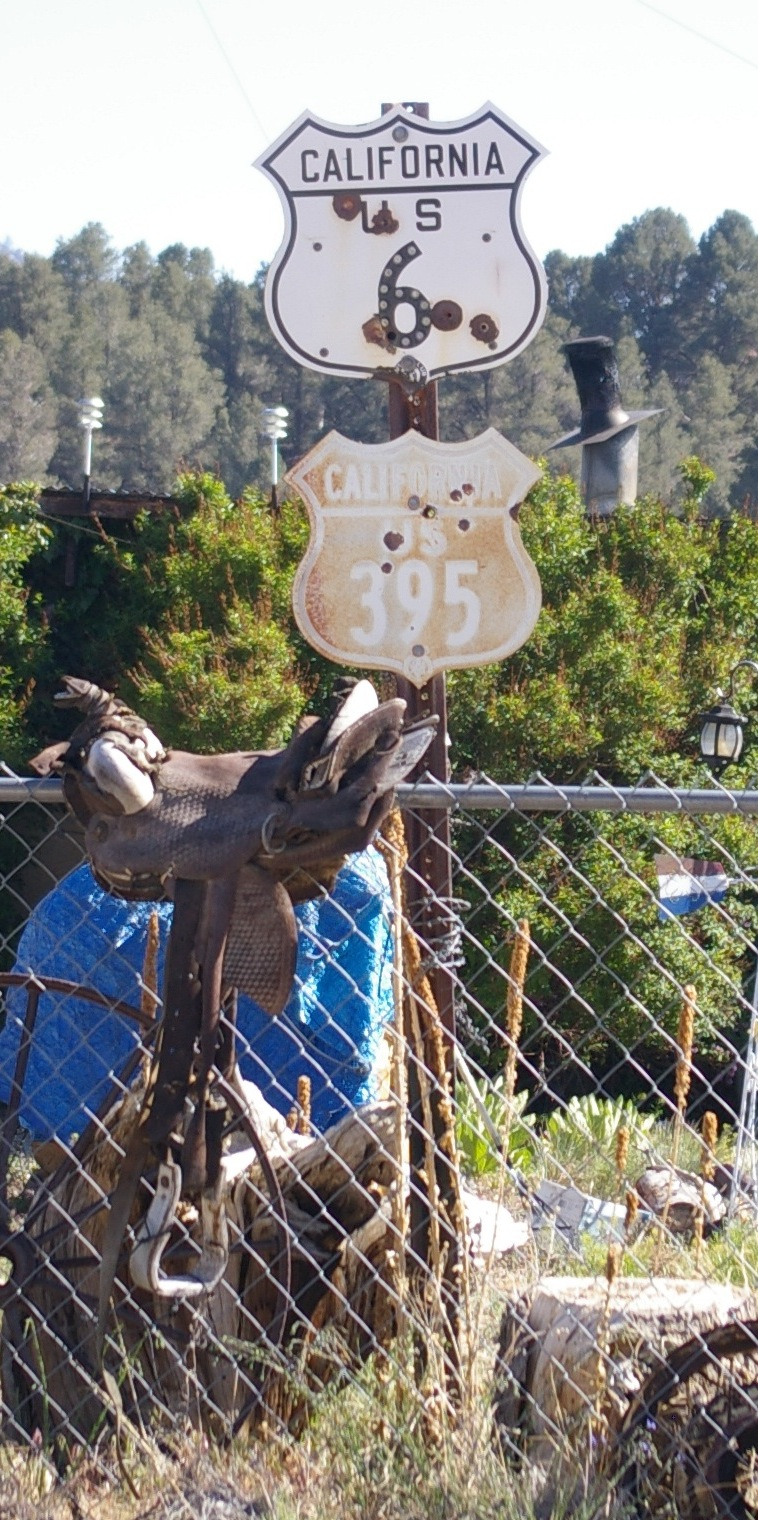
Old US 6/US 395 signs near Inyokern

=== Camino Sierra ===
The Camino Sierra was a trail from Los Angeles to Lake Tahoe loosely paralleling modern State Route 14, US 395, and State Route 89. The trail was first believed to be used by Jedediah Smith in 1826. The trail was in common use by prospectors passing through the area because of the California gold rush and Comstock Lode. Though this area was not directly affected by the gold and silver rushes, the Owens Valley was more fertile than the areas around the strikes in Nevada. Farmers and ranchers raised cattle and other goods to trade with the mining boom towns nearby. The town of Bishop was established to trade goods with the mining town of Aurora. By 1860, the Camino Sierra was an established trail appearing in maps and guides. After these mining rushes died down, the Camino Sierra saw a revival because of the construction of the Los Angeles Aqueduct beginning in 1908. The route was promoted for its scenic value by the Southern Pacific Railroad, as a side trip from its rail lines, as far back as 1912. By 1918, the Camino Sierra had been included in the Automobile Blue Book, an early road atlas of the United States.

=== Rail lines ===
Both the northern and southern segments of the US 395 corridor were used by railroads built in the 1880s branching from the First transcontinental railroad in Nevada. Both lines were intended to connect the main Southern Pacific Railroad line in Nevada with other lines, but were never completed.

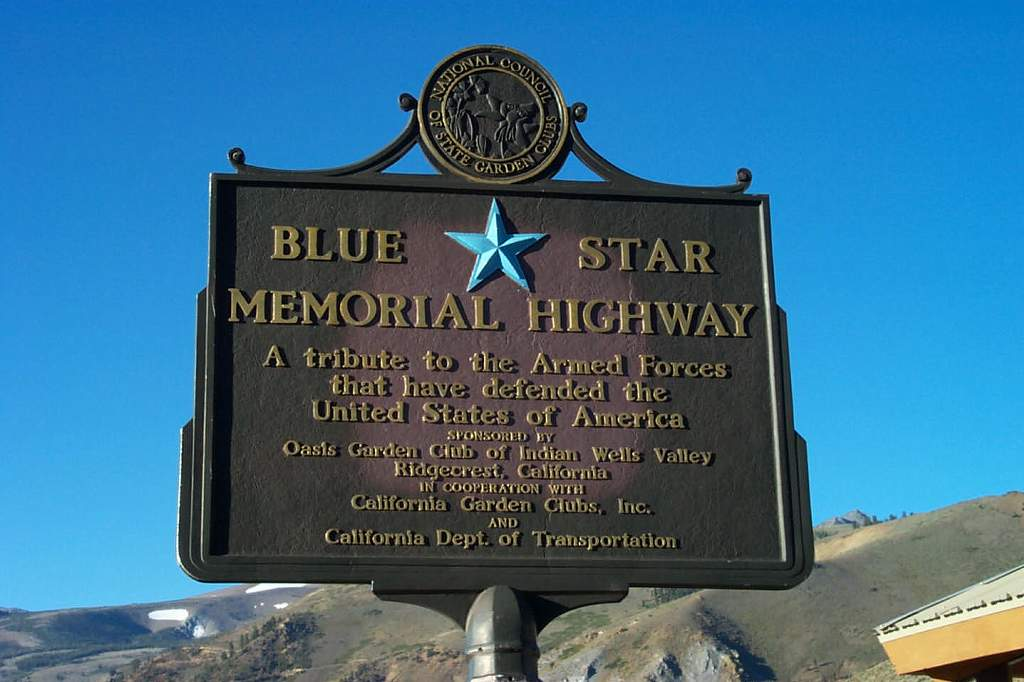
Blue Star Memorial Highway marker along US 395 just north of Mono Lake

On May 20, 1880, the Carson and Colorado Railway was formed, with the intent of extending a rail line from the existing Virginia and Truckee Railroad at Mound House, Nevada through the Owens Valley towards the Colorado River. Though the rail line was never finished, it did bring economic development to the valley. The railroad was never completed past Keeler on the shores of Owens Lake. This line was acquired by the Southern Pacific Railroad in 1900. There were plans to connect this narrow gauge line with SP's standard gauge lines in the area, however these plans never materialized and the narrow gauge line was scrapped in 1959.

The corridor for the northern segment was first used by the Nevada-California-Oregon Railway, a line also started in 1880, at Reno, to connect with the Great Northern Railway in Oregon. This line also was never completed, ending at Lakeview, Oregon. A portion of this line is still active and, through a series of acquisitions, the Union Pacific Railroad now owns this line. The portion from Reno to Hallelujah Junction is used as a connection between the Union Pacific's two main lines in northern California/Nevada, the Overland Route (First Transcontinental Railroad) and the Feather River Route.

=== Current designation ===
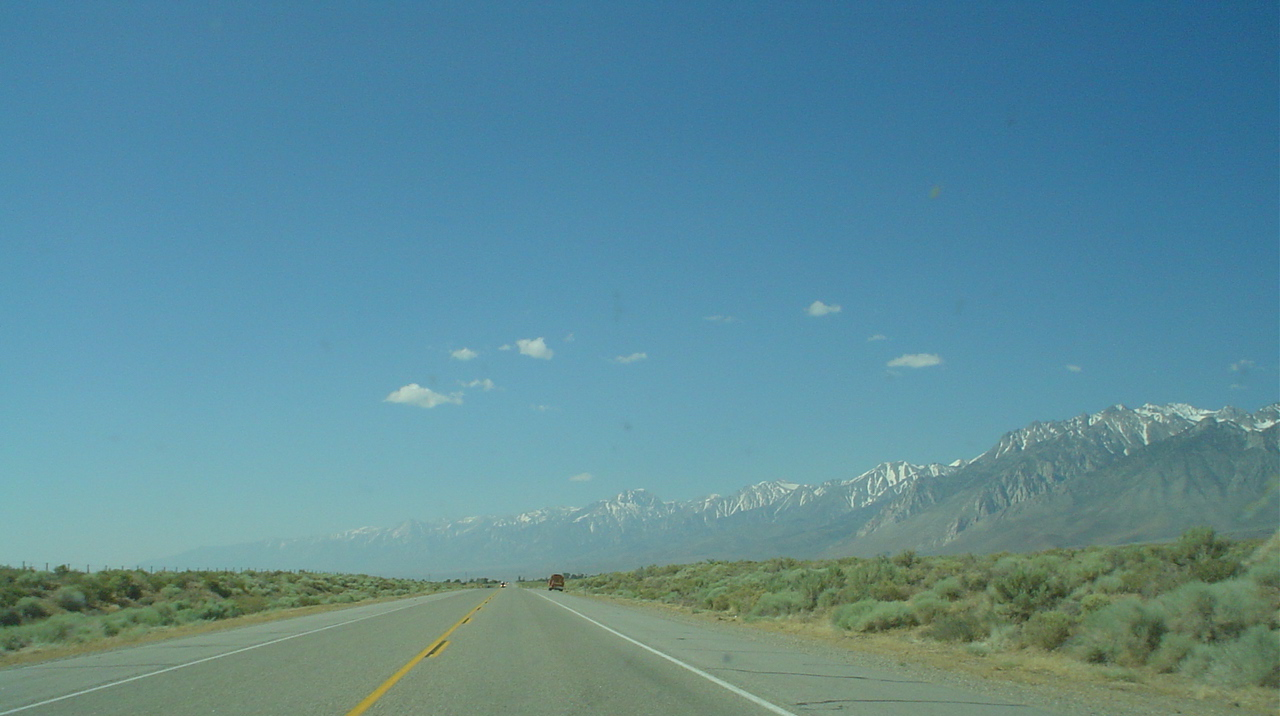
US 395 between Big Pine and Independence

As first commissioned in 1926, US 395 was a minor spur route of U.S. Route 195 connecting Spokane, Washington with Canada. During the 1930s, US 395 was extended from Spokane to San Diego, over the Camino Sierra, using several existing state routes. The extension first appeared on the Official Nevada Highway map in 1935 and its Californian equivalent in 1936. By 1937, US 6 had been extended to California, concurrent with US 395 between Bishop and Inyokern.

The new southern terminus of US 395 was at Pacific Highway (former US 101) in San Diego. Traveling north, US 395 traversed much of the path of modern SR 163 and I-15 to Poway Road, where it routed to the east along much of today's Pomerado Road to Lake Hodges, with various realignments over the years. Portions of Pomerado Road today are signed "Historic US 395". At Lake Hodges the highway crossed a now-replaced bridge to Escondido.

Past Escondido, the route passed through Fallbrook, using portions of what is now SR 78 and SR 76 before returning to I-15 near Temecula. This portion was straightened to the route of modern I-15 by 1960. Past Temecula, the route followed SR 71, SR 74, I-215, and I-15 until reaching the modern terminus in Hesperia. This part would also be straightened with the construction of what is now I-215. In 1969, the portion south of Hesperia was removed and assigned to other routes.

Over time, the road was paved, upgraded and straightened. Some parts are now built to freeway standards. Among the more notable upgrades, the Los Peñasquitos Creek Arch Bridge, along the portion of former US 395 now used by I-15, was built in 1949, and replaced in 1964, with a second span built in 1977.

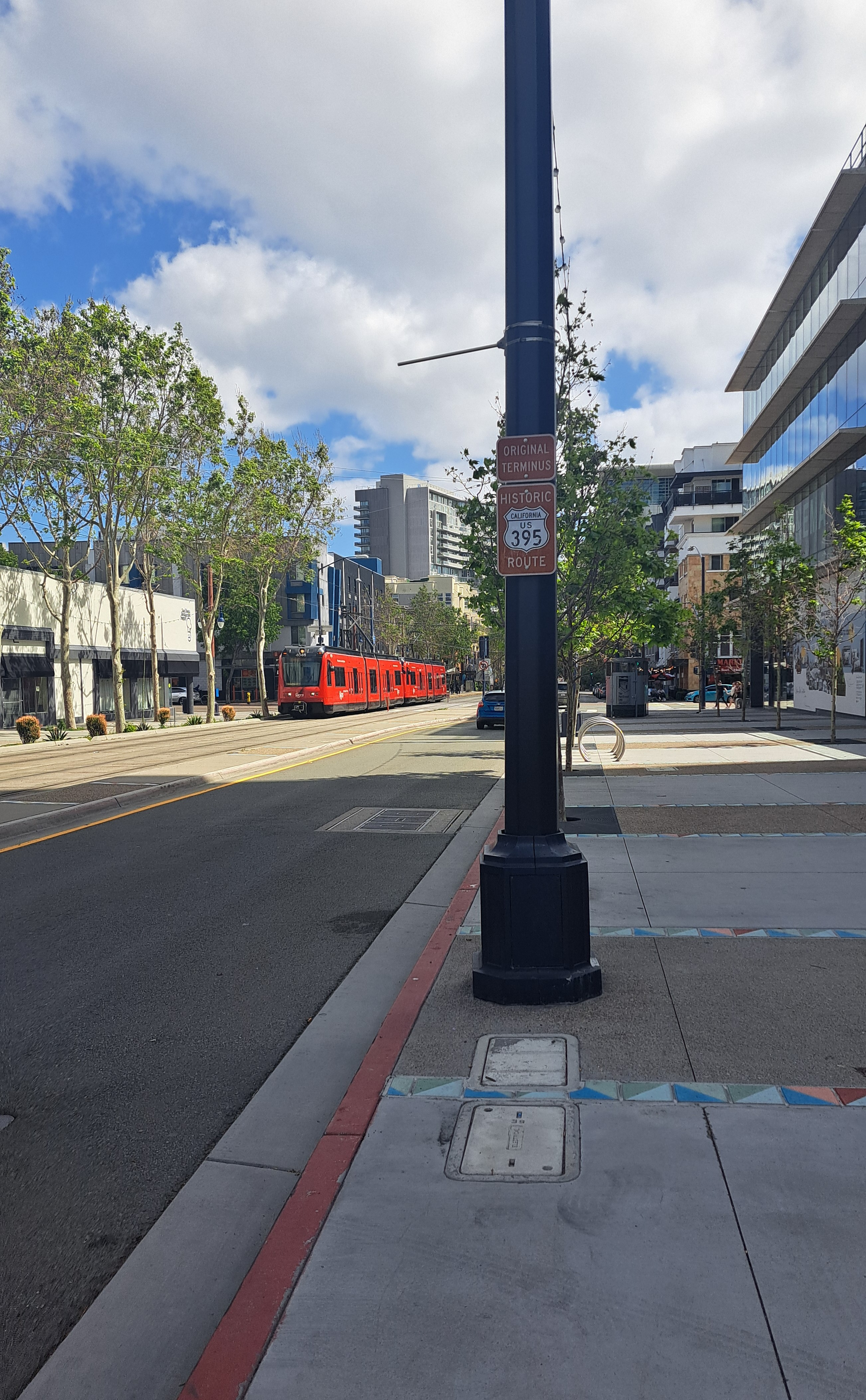
"Original Terminus - Historic Route US 395" near Park & Market Trolley Station, Downtown San Diego

In 2022, construction began on a bypass of Olancha and Cartago, which was controversial as most residents preferred improving the previously existing route. Once finished, the northern portion, through Cartago, was proposed to become a county route while the southern portion, through Olancha, would become an extension of SR 190. Southbound traffic was shifted onto the bypass on October 7, 2024, while northbound traffic was shifted onto the bypass on November 19, 2024, sharing the southbound carriageway with southbound traffic. SR 190's new connection with the bypass southeast of Olancha opened to traffic on December 19, 2024. Northbound traffic was shifted onto the bypass' northern carriageway on June 11, 2025, completing the bypass in full. However, construction continued until October 23, 2025, when Caltrans held a ribbon-cutting ceremony marking the end of all construction on the project.

== Future ==
Currently US 395 runs as a surface street through most of the cities and towns it serves. However, numerous proposals for bypasses of several of the towns along the route have been proposed, with varying degrees of progress since first proposal. Proposals with no current construction include longstanding proposals to bypass Bishop, and a freeway bypass of the current surface route through Adelanto, Victorville, and Hesperia.

With the fast growth of the Victorville area, Caltrans and the county governments have noted a dramatic increase in congestion and accidents along the route. While short-term fixes are in progress to increase capacity, the governments note the numerous fixes already implemented along US 395 have failed to reduce congestion or increase safety and a freeway bypass is likely needed. The frustration over a lack of progress on a freeway bypass of the Victorville area has led to community protests and petitions to accelerate progress for a freeway alignment of US 395.

== Major intersections ==
Except where prefixed with a letter, postmiles were measured on the road as it was in 1964, based on the alignment that existed at the time, and do not necessarily reflect current mileage. R reflects a realignment in the route since then, M indicates a second realignment, L refers to an overlap due to a correction or change, and T indicates postmiles classified as temporary. Segments that remain unconstructed or have been relinquished to local control may be omitted. The numbers reset at county lines; the start and end postmiles in each county are given in the county column.

County	Location	Postmile	Exit	Destinations	Notes
San Bernardino; SBD R3.98-73.52	Hesperia	R3.98		I-15 south (Mojave Freeway) – San Bernardino	Interchange; no direct access to I-15 north; south end of US 395; former US 395 south; I-15 north exit 141
San Bernardino; SBD R3.98-73.52	Hesperia	R4.51		Joshua Street to I-15 north (Mojave Freeway) – Victorville	
San Bernardino; SBD R3.98-73.52	Hesperia	R5.61		Main Street, Phelan Road – Phelan	
San Bernardino; SBD R3.98-73.52	Victorville	8.62		Bear Valley Road to I-15	
San Bernardino; SBD R3.98-73.52	Victorville–Adelanto line	11.18		SR 18 (Palmdale Road) – Palmdale	
San Bernardino; SBD R3.98-73.52	Kramer Junction	45.95		Twenty Mule Team Road (SR 58U / SR 58 Bus. west) – Boron, Bakersfield	South end of SR 58 Bus. overlap; former US 466 / SR 58
San Bernardino; SBD R3.98-73.52	Kramer Junction	46.21		SR 58 (Barstow–Bakersfield Highway) – Barstow, Bakersfield	Interchange; north end of SR 58 Bus. overlap; SR 58 exit 206
San Bernardino; SBD R3.98-73.52		72.77		Trona Road – Trona, Death Valley	
Kern; KER 0.00-R36.82		R1.15		Redrock Randsburg Road – Randsburg	
Kern; KER 0.00-R36.82		R15.00		China Lake Boulevard (US 395 Bus. north), Brown Road – Ridgecrest, China Lake NAWS	China Lake Boulevard serves Cerro Coso Community College; Brown Road is former US 395 north
Kern; KER 0.00-R36.82	Inyokern	R23.48	—	SR 178 (US 395 Bus. south, to SR 14 south) – Ridgecrest, Inyokern	Interchange; serves Ridgecrest Regional Hospital
Kern; KER 0.00-R36.82	Inyokern	R25.08	—	Brown Road – Inyokern	Interchange; southbound exit and northbound entrance; former US 395
Kern; KER 0.00-R36.82		R29.64	—	SR 14 south – Los Angeles	Interchange; southbound exit and northbound entrance; northern terminus of SR 14; former US 6 south
Inyo; INY R0.00-R129.46		R3.02		Nine Mile Canyon Road (CR J41) – Kennedy Meadows	Southern terminus of CR J41
Inyo; INY R0.00-R129.46	Coso Junction	17.80		Gill Station Coso Road, Sykes Road – Coso Junction Rest Area	
Inyo; INY R0.00-R129.46	Olancha			SR 190 east / US 395 Bus. north – Death Valley, Olancha, Cartago	Western terminus of SR 190 (eastern segment); former US 6 / US 395 north
Inyo; INY R0.00-R129.46	Cartago			Lake Street (US 395 Bus. south)	Former US 6 / US 395 south
Inyo; INY R0.00-R129.46	Lone Pine	55.83		SR 136 east to SR 190 – Death Valley	Western terminus of SR 136
Inyo; INY R0.00-R129.46	Lone Pine	57.90		Locust Street	Serves Southern Inyo Hospital
Inyo; INY R0.00-R129.46		83.90	Division Creek Rest Area		
Inyo; INY R0.00-R129.46	Big Pine	100.83		SR 168 east / County Road – Westgard Pass, Deep Springs	South end of SR 168 overlap
Inyo; INY R0.00-R129.46	Bishop	115.40		SR 168 west (West Line Street) / East Line Street – Lake Sabrina, South Lake	North end of SR 168 overlap; SR 168 serves Northern Inyo Hospital; East Line Street serves Eastern Sierra Regional Airport; SR 168 through traffic from Aspendell to Lake Sabrina closed in winters
Inyo; INY R0.00-R129.46	Bishop	116.25		US 6 east to US 95 – Tonopah	No left turn from southbound US 395; western terminus of US 6
Inyo; INY R0.00-R129.46	Bishop	116.41		Wye Road to US 6 east – Tonopah	
Mono; MNO R0.00-120.49		8.02	Sherwin Summit, elevation 7,000 feet (2,100 m)		
Mono; MNO R0.00-120.49	Tom's Place	R10.26		Crowley Lake Drive, Owens Gorge Road – Rock Creek Lake	
Mono; MNO R0.00-120.49		R13.93	—	South Landing Road – Crowley Lake, Hilton Creek	Interchange
Mono; MNO R0.00-120.49		20.36		Benton Crossing Road to SR 120 / US 6 – Owens River, Benton	
Mono; MNO R0.00-120.49		R25.75	—	SR 203 west – Mammoth Lakes, Devils Postpile	Interchange; eastern terminus of SR 203; serves Mammoth Hospital; through traffic from Mammoth Lakes to Devils Postpile closed in winters
Mono; MNO R0.00-120.49		R32.40	Crestview Rest Area		
Mono; MNO R0.00-120.49		36.12	Deadman Summit, elevation 8,041 feet (2,451 m)		
Mono; MNO R0.00-120.49	June Lake Junction	40.34		SR 158 north (June Lake Loop)	Southern terminus of SR 158
Mono; MNO R0.00-120.49		45.96		SR 120 east – Benton, Mono Lake South Tufa	South end of SR 120 overlap; through traffic to Benton closed in winters
Mono; MNO R0.00-120.49		46.40		SR 158 south (June Lake Loop)	Northern terminus of SR 158; closed in winters
Mono; MNO R0.00-120.49	Lee Vining	50.74		SR 120 west (Tioga Pass Road) / Airport Road – Tioga Pass, Yosemite National Park	North end of SR 120 overlap; through traffic to Yosemite closed in winters
Mono; MNO R0.00-120.49		58.24		SR 167 east / Lundy Lake Road – Hawthorne, Lundy Lake	Western terminus of SR 167
Mono; MNO R0.00-120.49		63.52	Conway Summit, elevation 8,138 feet (2,480 m)		
Mono; MNO R0.00-120.49		69.85		SR 270 east (Bodie Road) – Bodie	Western terminus of SR 270
Mono; MNO R0.00-120.49	Bridgeport	76.30		SR 182 north – Bridgeport Lake, Yerington	Southern terminus of SR 182
Mono; MNO R0.00-120.49	Sonora Junction	93.70		SR 108 west – Marine Corps Training Center, Sonora	Eastern terminus of SR 108; through traffic via Sonora Pass to Sonora closed in winters
Mono; MNO R0.00-120.49		88.11	Devil's Gate Pass, elevation 7,519 feet (2,292 m)		
Mono; MNO R0.00-120.49		116.96		SR 89 north to SR 4 – Monitor Pass, Markleeville	Southern terminus of SR 89; closed in winters
Mono; MNO R0.00-120.49		120.00	Agricultural Inspection Station (southbound only)		
Mono; MNO R0.00-120.49		120.49		US 395 north – Carson City	Continuation into Nevada
US 395 exits and reenters California via Nevada
Sierra; SIE R0.00-R3.12		R0.00		US 395 south – Reno	Continuation into Nevada; former overlap with US 40 Alt. east
Lassen; LAS R0.00-138.98		R1.50	Agricultural Inspection Station (northbound only)		
Lassen; LAS R0.00-138.98		R2.08	South end of freeway		
Lassen; LAS R0.00-138.98	Hallelujah Junction	R4.62	8	SR 70 west – Portola, Quincy	The only numbered exit on US 395 in California; northeastern terminus of SR 70; former SR 24 west / US 40 Alt. west
Lassen; LAS R0.00-138.98		T5.30	North end of freeway		
Lassen; LAS R0.00-138.98		29.84		CR A26 (Garnier Road) – Herlong, Sierra Army Depot	Southern terminus of CR A26
Lassen; LAS R0.00-138.98		34.51		CR A25 (Herlong Access Road) – Herlong	Western terminus of CR A25
Lassen; LAS R0.00-138.98		49.60	Honey Lake Rest Area		
Lassen; LAS R0.00-138.98		51.87		CR A3 north (Standish Buntingville Road) – Alturas, Lakeview	Southern terminus of CR A3
Lassen; LAS R0.00-138.98		R61.09		SR 36 west / Richmond Road East – Susanville	Eastern terminus of SR 36
Lassen; LAS R0.00-138.98	Standish	70.12		CR A3 south (Standish Buntingville Road) – Reno	Northern terminus of CR A3
Lassen; LAS R0.00-138.98	Litchfield	72.94		CR A27 (Center Road) – High Desert State Prison	Eastern terminus of CR A27
Lassen; LAS R0.00-138.98		96.50	Secret Valley Rest Area		
Lassen; LAS R0.00-138.98	Madeline	129.19		Ash Valley Road – Adin	
Modoc; MOD 0.06-61.56	Alturas	22.76		SR 299 west (12th Street) / Main Street – Redding, Klamath Falls	South end of SR 299 overlap; serves Modoc Medical Center
Modoc; MOD 0.06-61.56		27.10	Agricultural Inspection Station (southbound only)		
Modoc; MOD 0.06-61.56		28.29		SR 299 east – Cedarville, Gerlach	North end of SR 299 overlap
Modoc; MOD 0.06-61.56	New Pine Creek	61.56		US 395 north – Lakeview	Continuation into Oregon
1.000 mi = 1.609 km; 1.000 km = 0.621 mi: Concurrency terminus; Incomplete access

== Ridgecrest business loop ==
U.S. Route 395 Business
- Location: Ridgecrest

U.S. Route 395 Business (US 395 Bus.) is a business route of US 395 in Ridgecrest. It provides access to Ridgecrest as China Lake Boulevard and Inyokern Road. Part of the route is concurrent with State Route 178.

Major intersections

The entire route is in Kern County.

Location	mi	km	Destinations	Notes
	0.0	0.0	Brown Road	Continuation beyond US 395; former US 395 north
	0.0	0.0	US 395 – San Bernardino, Bishop	Southern terminus
Ridgecrest	4.8	7.7	College Heights Boulevard	Serves Cerro Coso Community College
Ridgecrest	6.1	9.8	SR 178 east (Ridgecrest Boulevard) – Trona, Death Valley	South end of SR 178 overlap
Ridgecrest	8.1	13.0	China Lake Boulevard, Inyokern Road – NAWS China Lake	
Inyokern	15.6	25.1	US 395 – Bishop, Reno, San Bernardino	Interchange; northern terminus; north end of SR 178 overlap
Inyokern	15.6	25.1	SR 178 west (Inyokern Road) to SR 14 south – Inyokern, Lake Isabella	Continuation beyond US 395
1.000 mi = 1.609 km; 1.000 km = 0.621 mi: Concurrency terminus

== See also ==
U.S. Route 395
Previous state: Terminus	California	Next state: Nevada
Previous state: Nevada	California	Next state: Oregon
