= Deadman Summit =

Mountain pass in the Sierra Nevada, California

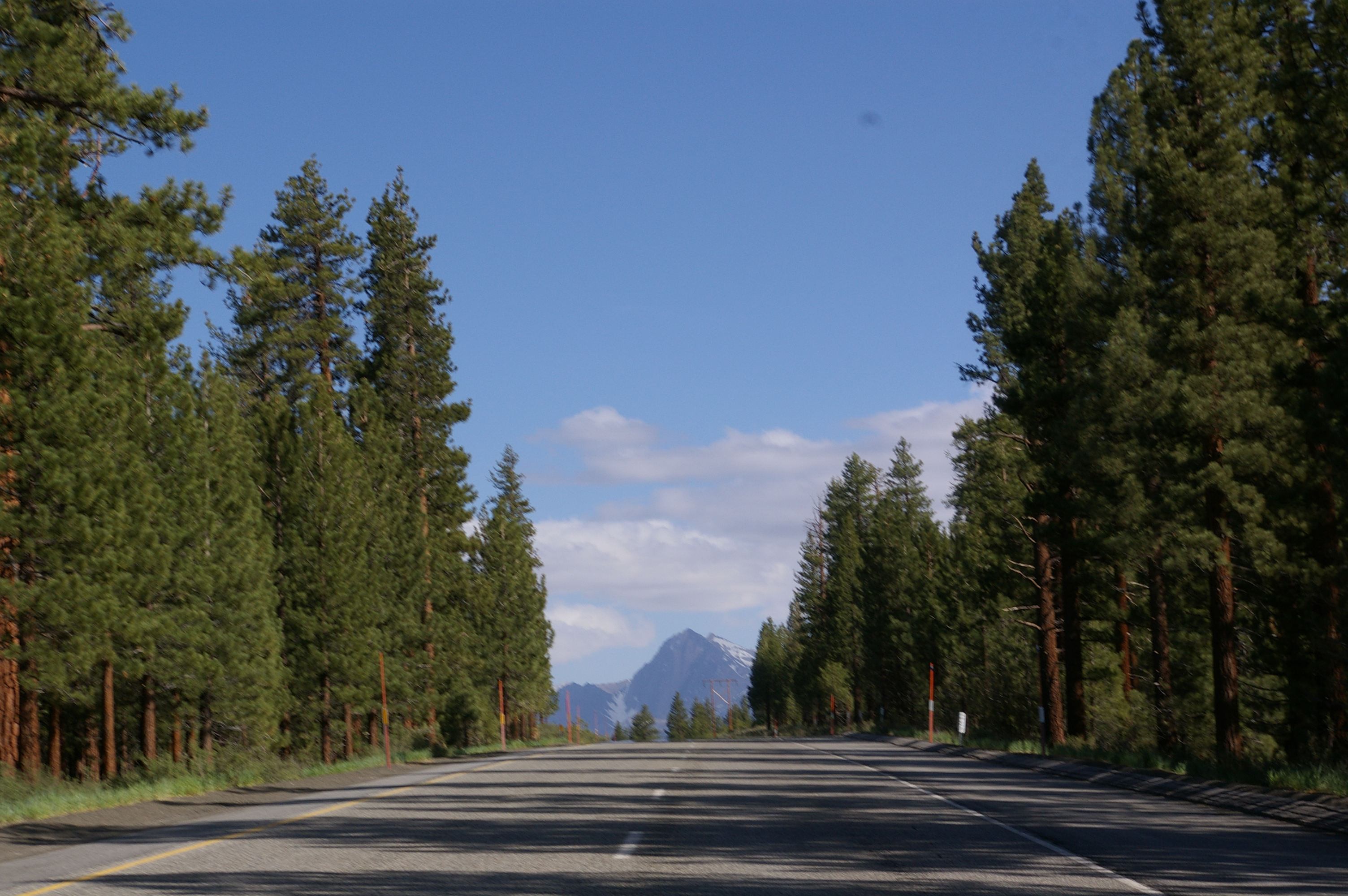
- Deadman Summit, facing South, with Mount Morrison in the distance

- Location within California
- Elevation: 8,047 feet (2,453 m) NAVD 88
- Traversed by: US 395

Third Approach
- Location: Mono County, California, U.S.
- Coordinates: 37°46′15″N 119°00′30″W
- Topo map: USGS June Lake

Deadman Summit is a mountain pass in the Sierra Nevada in Mono County, California. It crosses the northern rim of the Long Valley Caldera, connecting the northern end of the Owens River watershed with Mono Lake via U.S. Highway 395. The pass, and the nearby creek with the same name, were named for the decapitated body of a murder victim found in the vicinity around 1868.

Deadman Summit is commonly traversed by travelers from Southern California seeking recreation in the June Lake, June Mountain, and Mono Lake areas.
