= Devil's Gate Pass =

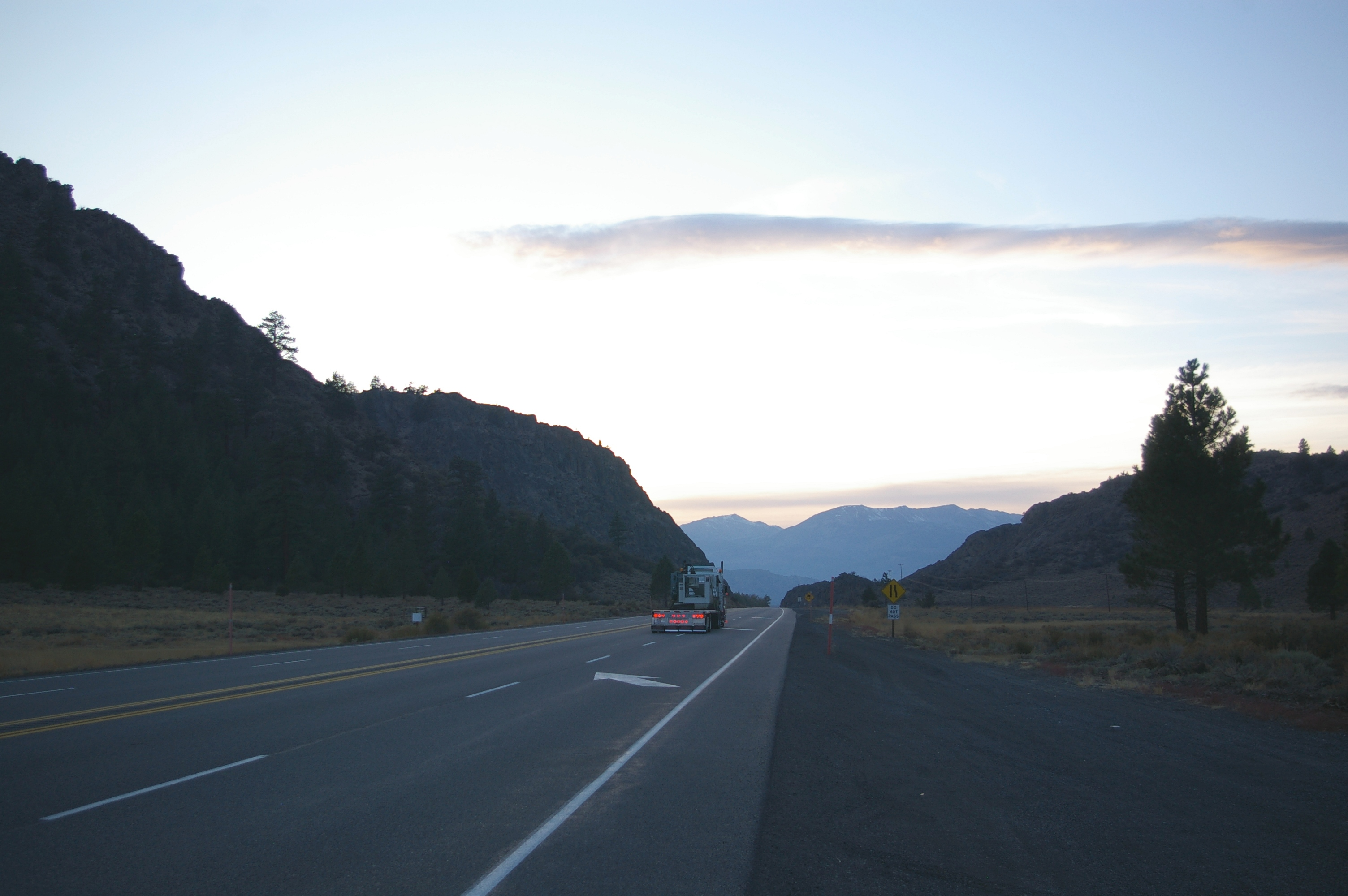

- Location within California
- Elevation: 7,519 ft (2,292 m)
- Traversed by: US 395

Third Approach
- Location: Mono County, California, United States
- Range: Sweetwater Mountains
- Coordinates: 38°20′54″N 119°21′43″W
- Topo map: USGS Fales Hot Springs

Devil's Gate Pass is a mountain pass in Mono County, California, traversed by U.S. Route 395. The pass is named for the Devils Gate, a granitic formation located west of the summit of the pass.

== Location ==
Bridgeport and the East Walker River lie to the east and south of Devil's Gate, and the West Walker River lies to the west and north. The Sierra Nevada rise up from the west and south of the pass, while to the northeast the Sweetwater Mountains spur off from the Sierra Nevada. The Little Walker Caldera lies southwest of the pass.

Devil's Gate Pass is a few miles east of Sonora Junction, which is the junction of U.S. 395 with State Route 108. This segment of U.S. 395 connects Antelope Walker valley to Big Meadows (Bridgeport). State Route 108 terminates at Sonora Junction with the west bound road connecting to Sonora Pass and Sonora over the Sierra Nevada. The given coordinates are the location of the highest point of U.S. Route 395 through the pass (what Caltrans calls the summit of the pass).

== Visitor information ==
Visitors to the area should acquire a Toiyabe National Forest service map before exploring beyond U.S. Route 395. Although most of the surrounding land is publicly owned and accessible via Burcham Flat Road (the correct spelling of Burcham is uncertain and varies, verbal communication to editor from Mono County records archivist) and Little Walker Road, the land on either side of U.S. Route 395 through the pass is privately owned. The forest service map highlights public and private lands in color.

== Flora ==
A wide variety of flora can be found around the summit. Besides the dominant Artemisia tridentata (big sage) and Purshia tridentata (bitterbrush) noteworthy large plants include Juniperus occidentalis (western juniper), Pinus jeffreyi (Jeffrey pine), Cercocarpus ledifolius (curl leaf mountain mahogany), Amelanchier (service berry uncertain species) and Populus tremuloides (quaking aspen). Amelanchier and Populus tremuloides display bright yellow colors in the fall, attracting photographers. Many of these are exceptionally large and old for the species, with junipers up to 1500 years old (verbal revision of 1172 age of DGS-19 from Scotty Strachan), juniper snags up to 2200 years old (in tree ring lab at University of Nevada, Reno), Jeffreys over 400 years old having been verified (core sample taken and dated by Scotty Strachan, unpublished data). Too many other species are present in less conspicuous numbers to enumerate. Small wildflowers are abundant in the spring.

== Fauna ==
The area west of the Devil's Gate is designated as a deer migration zone by the Mono County Planning commission. The Rocky Mountain mule deer cross US-395 near the pass regularly and there are deer crossing signs to warn drivers of the hazard. Numerous other animals have been spotted in the area around the pass including American badger, black bear, chipmunk, cougar, coyote, rabbit, rubber boa, sage grouse, and vole. Numerous song birds are present during the warmer months. Ravens and hawks can be seen flying overhead.

== History and land use ==
John C. Fremont crossed the pass in Jan 1844. His party was surveying the western boundary of the Nevada Basin but due to cold weather they were forced to search for a route across the Sierra Nevada and the warmth of California's central valley. Due to difficult terrain and deep snow (weather estimates indicate snowfall was significantly below normal at the time), he was forced to abandon his cannon on Jan 29, 1844 after crossing the pass (from Fremont's log). It is unclear if the cannon has ever been found. The Mono County museum has on display what is claimed to be the cannon carriage, which was found a few miles away in 2011-2012.

Various commercial activities have been attempted along the pass. Enough water to power a mill was noted by William H. Brewer in his journal entry for July 15, 1863. The remnants of a steam powered machine (probably a saw mill) can be found on private property near the gate along Saw Mill Creek (identified by the property owner and viewed by the editor).

A stage stop and resort at Fales Hot spring 2 miles to the west was operated from about 1877 through 1952. In 1952 the main building was burned in a Butane filling accident. A newer resort was constructed in 1954 using the insurance money but most of it was subsequently torn down. The still standing restaurant has been converted into a private residence (verbal communication between editor and owner of the property). The gasoline station next to the resort remained open until at least the 1970s and was torn down around 1990. A small ski run was operated at Swaugger Creek, 4 miles to the east of the pass, in the 1930s. The Devil's Gate pack station catering to deer hunters was operated at the pass by the Virginia Lakes Pack Outfit from 1981 until 1999 (verbal communication to the editor from the Virginia Lakes Pack Outfit owner, 2013). Currently much of the private land is used as pasture (west side of pass) or for private homes (east side of pass).
