= List of mountain passes in California =

The following is a list of mountain passes and gaps in California. California is geographically diverse with numerous roads and railways traversing within its borders. In the middle of the U.S. state lies the California Central Valley, bounded by the coastal mountain ranges in the west, the Sierra Nevada to the east, the Cascade Range in the north and the Tehachapi Mountains in the south. Although most of these passes are now traversed by state highways, some date prior to California's statehood in 1850 and are today registered as California Historical Landmarks.

# California Historical Landmark
* Interstate highway bypasses the actual mountain pass
^ Long-distance trail. No road or rail access
~ Unpaved dirt road or trail

Name	Mountain range	County	Elevation	Coordinates	Primary access route	Other access route(s)	GNIS
Adin Pass	Warner Mountains	Modoc	5,194 feet (1,583 m)	41°20′48″N 120°55′17″W	SR 139 / SR 299		256121
Alcoholic Pass	Santa Rosa Mountains	San Diego	1,565 feet (477 m)	33°21′37″N 116°22′32″W	Alcoholic Pass Trail~	Coyote Canyon Road~	238484
Altamont Pass	Diablo Range	Alameda	1,009 feet (308 m)	37°44′45″N 121°39′30″W	I-580*	Altamont Pass Road; Union Pacific Railroad	218189
Anderson Grade Summit	Cascade Range	Siskiyou	3,067 feet (935 m)	41°48′06″N 122°34′55″W	I-5*		N/A
Apache Saddle	San Emigdio Mountains	Kern	6,099 feet (1,859 m)	34°51′38″N 119°12′34″W	FH 95	Cerro Noroeste Road	254416
Arrowhead Highlands Summit	San Bernardino Mountains	San Bernardino County	5,174 feet (1,577 m)	34°13′39″N 117°15′18″W	SR 18		N/A
Bear Divide	San Gabriel Mountains	Los Angeles	2,687 feet (819 m)	34°21′36″N 118°23′36″W	Little Tujunga Canyon Road	Santa Clara Truck Trail~	239096
Beckwourth Pass	Sierra Nevada	Plumas	5,221 feet (1,591 m)	39°47′30″N 120°6′28″W	SR 70	Feather River Route	256775
Bernasconi Pass	Bernasconi Hills	Riverside	1,709 feet (521 m)	33°50′27″N 117°09′42″W	SR 79	Bernasconi Road	239244
Berry Summit	Northern Coast Ranges	Humboldt	2,828 feet (862 m)	40°53′45″N 123°46′16″W	SR 299	Old 299 Highway Titlow Hill Road	1658041
Big Valley Summit	Big Valley Mountains	Lassen	4,613 feet (1,406 m)	41°03′36″N 121°12′39″W	SR 299		253116
Black Butte Summit	Cascade Range	Siskiyou	3,912 feet (1,192 m)	41°21′17″N 122°21′14″W	I-5		1657848
Buckhorn Summit	Klamath Mountains	Shasta	3,274 feet (998 m)	40°38′08″N 122°44′01″W	SR 299		1655851
Burrows Gap	Northern Coast Ranges	Glenn	876 feet (267 m)	39°45′01″N 122°31′43″W	CR 306		266518
Bushnell Summit	Sierra Pelona Mountains	Los Angeles	4,101 feet (1,250 m)	34°42′13″N 118°31′41″W	CR N2	Forest Route 7N23	239899
Cahuenga Pass	Santa Monica Mountains	Los Angeles	745 feet (227 m)	34°7′28″N 118°20′34″W	US 101		239987
Cajon Pass	San Bernardino/San Gabriel Mountains	San Bernardino	3,777 feet (1,151 m)	34°19′33″N 117°25′42″W	I-15*	SR 138; Union Pacific Railroad; BNSF Railway	270155
Cajon Summit	San Bernardino/San Gabriel Mountains	San Bernardino	4,288 feet (1,307 m)	34°20′58″N 117°26′47″W	I-15		270157
Carson Pass	Sierra Nevada	Alpine	8,574 feet (2,613 m)	38°41′38″N 119°59′15″W	SR 88		258006
Cedar Pass	Warner Mountains	Modoc	6,407 feet (1,953 m)	41°33′45″N 120°16′08″W	SR 299		220791
Cloudburst Summit	San Gabriel Mountains	Los Angeles	7,034 feet (2,144 m)	34°21′05″N 117°56′04″W	SR 2	Pacific Crest Trail^	240711
Conway Summit	Sierra Nevada	Mono	8,143 feet (2,482 m)	38°05′17″N 119°10′55″W	US 395		258665
Corral Hollow Pass	Diablo Range	Alameda	1,600 feet (490 m)	37°38′57″N 121°36′34″W	CR J2		N/A
Cottonwood Pass	Diablo Range	San Luis Obispo	1,998 feet (609 m)	35°46′49″N 120°12′26″W	SR 41		240990
Cottonwood Pass	Cottonwood Mountains	Riverside County	2,881 feet (878 m)	33°43′34″N 115°48′47″W	Cottonwood Springs Road	I-10	240991
Coyote Pass	Verdugo Mountains	Los Angeles	407 feet (124 m)	34°03′13″N 118°08′59″W	Monterey Pass Road		241053
Cuesta Pass	Santa Lucia Range	San Luis Obispo	1,522 feet (464 m)	35°20′56″N 120°37′52″W	US 101		241160
Damnation Pass	Klamath Mountains	Shasta	4,278 feet (1,304 m)	40°56′31″N 122°32′28″W	Dog Creek Road~	Sanford Pass Road~	259027
Dawson Saddle	San Gabriel Mountains	Los Angeles	7,943 feet (2,421 m)	34°22′04″N 117°48′12″W	SR 2		241294
Deadman Summit	Sierra Nevada	Mono	8,047 feet (2,453 m)	37°46′15″N 119°00′30″W	US 395		1658383
Devil's Gate Pass	Sweetwater Mountains	Mono	7,519 feet (2,292 m)	38°20′54″N 119°21′43″W	US 395		222305
Dillon Divide	San Gabriel Mountains	Los Angeles	2,736 feet (834 m)	34°20′40″N 118°20′55″W	Little Tujunga Canyon Road		241502
Donner Pass	Sierra Nevada	Nevada	7,056 feet (2,151 m)	39°18′57″N 120°19′17″W	I-80*	Donner Pass Road; California Trail; Overland Route	259475
Donner Summit	Sierra Nevada	Nevada	6,637 feet (2,023 m)	39°19′36″N 120°23′35″W	I-80	Donner Pass Road	276078
Dulzura Summit	Peninsular Ranges	San Diego	1,499 feet (457 m)	32°36′56″N 116°44′17″W	SR 94	Little Tecate Road	241667
East Casitas Pass	Transverse Ranges/Santa Ynez Mountains	Ventura	1,158 feet (353 m)	34°23′09″N 119°22′52″W	SR 150	Casitas Pass Road	241746
Ebbetts Pass	Sierra Nevada	Alpine	8,736 feet (2,663 m)	38°32′40″N 119°48′43″W	SR 4		259784
Echo Summit	Sierra Nevada	El Dorado	7,382 feet (2,250 m)	38°48′47″N 120°01′49″W	US 50		259792
Escondido Summit	Sierra Pelona Mountains	Los Angeles	3,258 feet (993 m)		SR 14		
Etna Summit	Klamath Mountains	Siskiyou	5,912 feet (1,802 m)	41°23′42″N 122°59′35″W	Sawyers Bar Road~	Pacific Crest Trail^	259971
Eucalyptus Pass	Peninsular Ranges	San Diego	640 feet (200 m)	32°46′44″N 116°59′12″W	I-8		1666238
Fandango Pass	Warner Mountains	Modoc	6,135 feet (1,870 m)	41°48′08″N 120°12′12″W	Fandango Pass Road~		223385
Foot and Walker Pass	Earthquake Valley	San Diego	2,589 feet (789 m)	33°02′12″N 116°24′09″W	CR S2	Little Blair Valley Road~	242343
Forest Mountain Summit	Klamath Mountains	Siskiyou	4,097 feet (1,249 m)	41°40′33″N 122°43′33″W	SR 3		N/A
Forester Pass	Sierra Nevada	Tulare	13,153 feet (4,009 m)	36°41′39″N 118°22′19″W	John Muir Trail^		260262
Fredonyer Pass	Sierra Nevada/Cascades	Lassen	5,751 feet (1,753 m)	40°21′35″N 120°52′03″W	SR 36		260357
Gaviota Pass	Santa Ynez Mountains	Santa Barbara	135 feet (41 m)	34°29′22″N 120°13′34″W	US 101		271287
Gilbert Pass	White/Inyo Mountains	Inyo	6,381 feet (1,945 m)	37°25′51″N 117°56′19″W	SR 168		1667222
Glen Pass	Sierra Nevada	Fresno	11,798 feet (3,596 m)	36°47′20″N 118°24′45″W	John Muir Trail^		260603
Godde Pass	Sierra Pelona Mountains	Los Angeles	3,386 feet (1,032 m)	34°36′30″N 118°14′40″W	Godde Hill Road		271321
Goods Mountain	Northern Coast Ranges	Trinity	4,032 feet (1,229 m)	40°22′48″N 123°01′16″W	SR 36	McFarland Ridge Road	224315
Greenhorn Summit	Sierra Nevada	Kern	6,092 feet (1,857 m)	35°44′18″N 118°33′26″W	SR 155	Rancheria Road	271436
Gunsight Pass	San Bernardino Mountains	San Bernardino	7,316 feet (2,230 m)	34°02′20″N 116°49′49″W	Raywood Flat Road (Private)~		243090
Hatchet Mountain Pass (signage: Hatchet Mountain Summit)	Klamath Mountains/Cascade Range	Shasta	4,340 feet (1,320 m)	40°51′09″N 121°46′01″W	SR 299		261152
Haywards Pass	Diablo Range	Alameda	699 feet (213 m)	37°41′50″N 121°58′09″W	I-580		1670277
Hebron Summit	Cascade Range	Siskiyou	5,223 feet (1,592 m)	41°41′58″N 122°02′29″W	US 97		1657778
Hecker Pass	Santa Cruz Mountains	Santa Cruz	1,339 feet (408 m)	36°59′40″N 121°43′02″W	SR 152		225111
Henness Pass	Sierra Nevada	Sierra	6,916 feet (2,108 m)	39°30′10″N 120°26′22″W	Henness Pass Road		225177
Historic Donner Summit	Sierra Nevada	Nevada	7,135 feet (2,175 m)	39°19′0″N 120°19′34″W	Donner Pass Road	Pacific Crest Trail^	N/A
Ibex Pass	Sperry Hills	Inyo-San Bernardino border	2,072 feet (632 m)	35°47′40″N 116°20′26″W	SR 127		243763
Islip Saddle	San Gabriel Mountains	Los Angeles	6,670 feet (2,030 m)	34°21′25″N 117°51′02″W	SR 2	SR 39 (closed); Pacific Crest Trail^	243931
Kaiser Pass	Sierra Nevada	Fresno	9,177 feet (2,797 m)	37°17′29″N 119°6′10″W	Kaiser Pass Road		262064
Laguna Summit	Cuyamaca Mountains	San Diego	4,055 feet (1,236 m)	32°48′39″N 116°30′36″W	I-8	Sunrise Highway	N/A
Little Pigeon Pass	Riverside Mountains	San Bernardino	1,158 feet (353 m)	34°02′20″N 117°18′05″W	Barton Road	Honey Hill Drive	244939
Lord-Ellis Summit	Northern Coast Ranges	Humboldt	2,267 feet (691 m)	40°55′49″N 123°51′36″W	SR 299	Old Dolly Varden Road; Old Highway 200	262920
Low Gap	Northern Coast Ranges	Trinity	2,753 feet (839 m)	40°27′38″N 123°31′25″W	SR 36		262992
Luther Pass	Sierra Nevada	Alpine-El Dorado border	7,740 feet (2,360 m)	38°47′13″N 119°56′45″W	SR 89		263076
Mendocino Pass	Northern Coast Ranges	Glenn	5,006 feet (1,526 m)	39°47′39″N 122°56′06″W	FH 7 / SR 162~		263454
Mill Creek Summit	San Gabriel Mountains	Los Angeles	4,898 feet (1,493 m)	34°23′30″N 118°04′51″W	CR N3	Pacific Crest Trail^	272468
Minaret Summit	Sierra Nevada	Madera-Mono border	9,265 feet (2,824 m)	37°39′23″N 119°03′37″W	SR 203	Reds Meadow Road	263666
Mission Pass	Diablo Range	Alameda	662 feet (202 m)	37°33′37″N 121°54′39″W	I-680		228838
Monitor Pass	Sierra Nevada	Alpine	8,314 feet (2,534 m)	38°40′32″N 119°37′10″W	SR 89		228917
Morgan Summit	Sierra Nevada	Tehama	5,760 feet (1,760 m)	40°21′50″N 121°32′07″W	SR 89 / SR 36		1659178
Mount Baldy Notch	San Gabriel Mountains	San Bernardino	7,821 feet (2,384 m)	34°16′22″N 117°36′38″W	Mount Baldy Road (Private)		246254
Muir Pass	Sierra Nevada	Fresno	11,955 feet (3,644 m)	37°06′42″N 118°40′14″W	John Muir Trail^		263951
Newhall/Fremont Pass	Santa Susana/San Gabriel Mountains	Los Angeles	750 feet (230 m)	34°20′43″N 118°30′26″W	I-5	SR 14; San Fernando Road; Sierra Highway	242485
Nojoqui Summit	Santa Ynez Mountains	Santa Barbara	919 feet (280 m)	34°31′42″N 120°11′49″W	US 101		1661111
Oak Creek Pass	Tehachapi Mountains	Kern	4,820 feet (1,470 m)	35°03′39″N 118°23′20″W	Tehachapi Willow Springs Road		246716
Onyx Summit	San Bernardino Mountains	San Bernardino	8,443 feet (2,573 m)	34°11′32″N 116°43′8″W	SR 38		272805
Oregon Mountain Summit (signage: Oregon Mountain Pass)	Klamath Mountains	Trinity	2,910 feet (890 m)	40°44′19″N 122°58′59″W	SR 299	Glennison Gap Road; Jennings Road	1665401
Pacheco Pass	Diablo Range	Merced-Santa Clara border	1,368 feet (417 m)	37°3′59″N 121°13′7″W	SR 152		230196
Pacific Grade Summit	Sierra Nevada	Alpine	8,051 feet (2,454 m)	38°31′00″N 119°54′34″W	SR 4		274786
Panoche Pass	Diablo Range	San Benito	2,250 feet (690 m)	36°37′41″N 121°00′51″W	CR J1		230286
Patchen Pass	Santa Cruz Mountains	Santa Cruz-Santa Clara border	1,814 feet (553 m)	37°08′39″N 121°59′05″W	SR 17	Summit Road	252422
Patterson Pass	Diablo Range	Alameda	1,608 feet (490 m)	37°41′13″N 121°37′48″W	Patterson Pass Road		230412
Pigeon Pass	Riverside Mountains	San Bernardino	1,923 feet (586 m)	33°59′34″N 117°16′34″W	Pigeon Pass Road		247460
Pine Mountain Summit	Santa Ynez Mountains	Ventura	5,160 feet (1,570 m)	34°39′00″N 119°23′08″W	SR 33		N/A
Pioneer Pass	Simi Hills	Ventura	1,726 feet (526 m)	34°15′25″N 118°38′57″W	Box Canyon Road		247569
Polonio Pass	Temblor / Diablo Range	Kern	1,407 feet (429 m)	35°43′25″N 120°11′36″W	SR 46		254163
Red Box Gap	San Gabriel Mountains	Los Angeles	4,636 feet (1,413m)	34°15′31″N 118°06′18″W	SR 2		248030
Ridgewood Summit	Mendocino Range	Mendocino	1,956 feet (596 m)	39.3407°N 123.3167°W	US 101		N/A
Saddleback	Cuyamaca Mountains	San Diego	1,955 feet (596 m)	33°00′08″N 116°42′53″W	Eagle Peak Road~	Cedar Creek Road~	248514
San Fernando Pass	Santa Susana/San Gabriel Mountains	Los Angeles	1,726 feet (526 m)	34°20′45″N 118°30′36″W	Sierra Highway		248844
San Francisquito Pass	Sierra Pelona Mountains	Los Angeles	3,655 feet (1,114 m)	34°38′22″N 118°22′50″W	San Francisquito Canyon Road		N/A
San Gorgonio Pass	San Bernardino/San Jacinto Mountains	Riverside	1,591 feet (485 m)	33°55′0″N 116°45′03″W	I-10*	Railroad Avenue Union Pacific Railroad	273482
San Marcos Pass	Santa Ynez Mountains	Santa Barbara	2,225 feet (678 m)	34°30′42″N 119°49′29″W	SR 154		248912
Santa Rosa Summit	Santa Rosa	Riverside	4,997 feet (1,523 m)	33°33′41″N 116°34′13″W	SR 74		273567
Santa Susana Pass	Santa Susana Mountains/Simi Hills	Los Angeles	1,608 feet (490 m)	34°16′06″N 118°37′58″W	SR 118	Santa Susana Pass Road	249127
Scott Mountain Summit	Klamath Mountains	Trinity	5,558 feet (1,694 m)	41°16′34″N 122°41′36″W	SR 3	Pacific Crest Trail^	1659612
Sepulveda Pass	Santa Monica Mountains	Los Angeles	1,130 feet (340 m)	34°7′37″N 118°28′29″W	I-405	Sepulveda Boulevard	N/A
Sespe Gorge	Topatopa Mountains	Ventura	3,556 feet (1,084 m)	34°34′44″N 119°15′29″W	SR 33		249299
Sherman Pass	Sierra Nevada	Tulare	9,200 feet (2,800 m)	35°59′26″N 118°21′57″W	Sherman Pass Road		1667613
Sherwin Summit	Sierra Nevada	Mono	6,426 feet (1,959 m)	37°30′52″N 118°37′40″W	US 395		1659642
Slate Range Crossing	Slate Range	Inyo	2,943 feet (897 m)	35°57′37″N 117°20′06″W	Trona Wildrose Road		1666993
Soledad Pass	Sierra Pelona / San Gabriel Mountains	Los Angeles	3,209 feet (978 m)	34°30′24″N 118°6′44″W	SR 14	Angeles Forest Highway; Sierra Highway; Union Pacific Railroad	273803
Sonora Pass	Sierra Nevada	Mono-Tuolumne border	9,624 feet (2,933 m)	38°19′40″N 119°38′9″W	SR 108		1934439
Sunshine Summit		San Diego	3,294 feet (1,004m)	33°21′06″N 116°44′19″W	SR 79		250141
Sweeney Pass	Coyote Mountains	San Diego	988 feet (301 m)	32°50′00″N 116°10′43″W	CR S2		250170
Sweetwater Pass	Peninsular Ranges	San Diego	587 feet (179 m)	32°46′32″N 116°55′43″W	Grove Road	CR S17	1666245
Tecate Divide	Cuyamaca Mountains	San Diego	4,140 feet (1,260 m)	32°42′03″N 116°19′31″W	I-8	Manzanita Road	250290
Tehachapi Pass	Tehachapi Mountains / Sierra Nevada	Kern	3,771 feet (1,149 m)	35°06′08″N 118°16′58″W	SR 58	Union Pacific Railroad	254326
Tejon Pass	San Emigdio / Tehachapi Mountains	Los Angeles / Kern County	4,160 feet (1,270 m)	34°48′10″N 118°52′37″W	I-5	North Peace Valley Road Ralphs Ranch Road Tejon Pass	274055
Teofulio Summit	San Felipe Hills	San Diego	3,681 feet (1,122 m)	33°12′17″N 116°36′13″W	CR S2		252258
The Narrows	Peninsular Ranges	San Diego	3,169 feet (966 m)	32°42′00″N 116°28′48″W	Cameron Truck Trail~	CR S1	274091
Tioga Pass	Sierra Nevada	Mono-Tuolumne border	9,943 feet (3,031 m)	37°54′40″N 119°15′29″W	SR 120		255154
Towne Pass	Inyo Mountains	Inyo	4,951 feet (1,509 m)	36°24′6″N 117°16′49″W	SR 190		250566
Triunfo Pass	Santa Monica Mountains	Ventura	2,103 feet (641 m)	34°06′48″N 118°54′59″W	Yerba Buena Road		250626
Vincent Gap	San Gabriel Mountains	Los Angeles	6,581 feet (2,006 m)	34°22′25″N 117°45′08″W	SR 2	Big Rock Creek Road; Pacific Crest Trail^	251060
Violin Summit	Sierra Pelona Mountains	Los Angeles	2,589 feet (789 m)		I-5	Old Ridge Route	
Walker Pass	Sierra Nevada	Kern	5,250 feet (1,600 m)	35°39′47″N 118°1′37″W	SR 178	Pacific Crest Trail^	255847
Westgard Pass	White/Inyo Mountains	Inyo	7,313 feet (2,229 m)	37°18′01″N 118°09′11″W	SR 168		237547
West Casitas Pass	Transverse Ranges/Santa Ynez Mountains	Ventura	1,024 feet (312 m)	34°23′20″N 119°24′52″W	SR 150	Casitas Pass Road	251324
Wheeler Gorge	Topatopa Mountains	Ventura	1,755/ feet (535 m)	34°30′30″N 119°16′29″W	SR 33		254389
Yaqui Pass	Santa Rosa	San Diego	1,742 feet (531 m)	33°08′47″N 116°21′06″W	CR S3		251845
Yuba Pass	Sierra Nevada	Sierra	6,709 feet (2,045 m)	39°37′3″N 120°29′20″W	SR 49		238294

== See also ==
- List of mountain passes and hills in the Tour of California
- List of Sierra Nevada road passes
