= Mill Creek Summit =

Mountain pass in Los Angeles County, California

- Interactive map of Mill Creek Summit
- Elevation: 4,910 feet (1,500 m)
- Traversed by: CR N3

Third Approach
- Location: Los Angeles County, California, U.S.
- Range: San Gabriel Mountains
- Coordinates: 34°23′36″N 118°04′52″W

Mill Creek Summit, elevation 4,910 ft (1,500 m), is a mountain pass in northern Los Angeles County, California.

It is located along the Angeles Forest Highway that ascends south into the San Gabriel Mountains from the Antelope Valley Freeway (SR 14) at Soledad Pass to the Angeles Crest Highway. It is the highest point on the Angeles Forest Highway – Angeles Crest Highway route that connects Pasadena and Lancaster.

== See also ==
- Landforms of Los Angeles County, California
- Soledad Canyon
- Escondido Summit
- Islip Saddle
