= Cahuenga Pass =

Landform in the Santa Monica Mountains of California

Coordinates: 34.12446°N 118.34286°W

- Paseo de Cahuenga
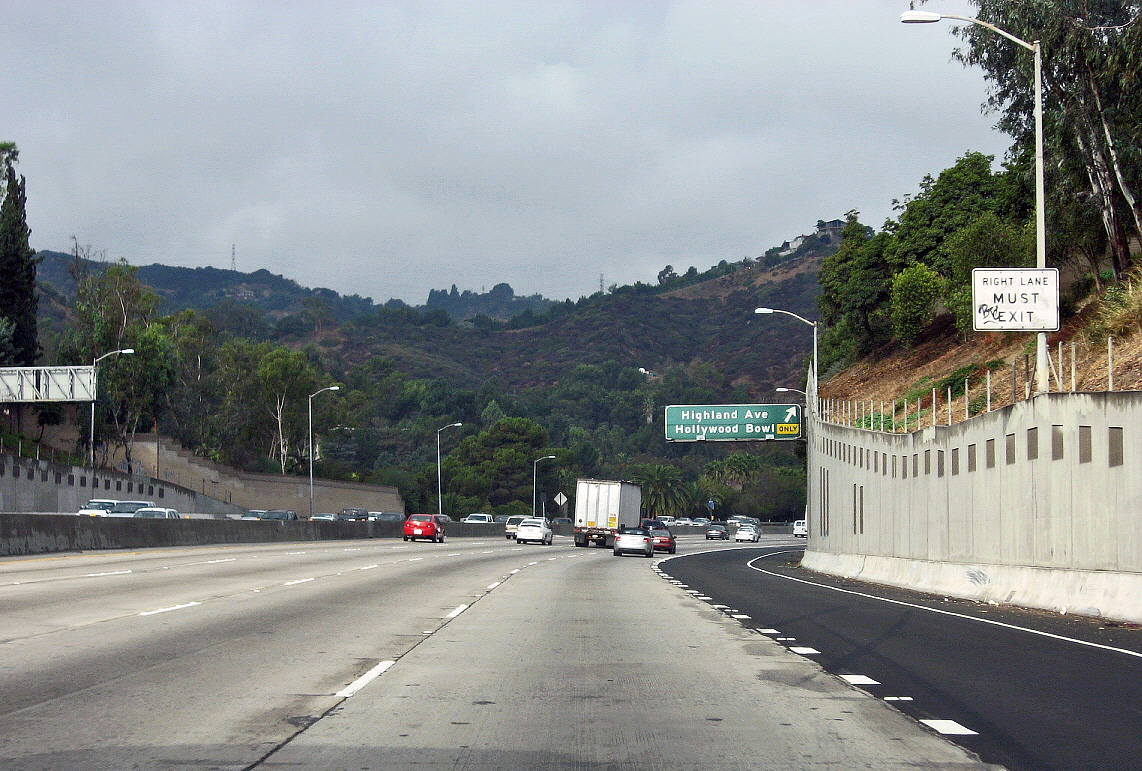
- Northbound US Route 101/Hollywood Freeway entering the Cahuenga Pass
- Interactive map of Cahuenga Pass
- Elevation: 745 feet (227 m)
- Traversed by: US 101 (Hollywood Freeway)

Third Approach
- Location: Los Angeles, California, United States
- Range: Santa Monica Mountains

The Cahuenga Pass (/kəˈwɛŋɡə/, /kəˈhʌŋ.ɡə/; Tongva: Kawé’nga), also known by its Spanish name Paseo de Cahuenga, is a low mountain pass through the eastern end of the Santa Monica Mountains in the Hollywood Hills district of the City of Los Angeles, California. It has an elevation of 745 ft (227 m). The Cahuenga Pass connects the Los Angeles Basin to the San Fernando Valley via U.S. Route 101 (Hollywood Freeway) and Cahuenga Boulevard. It is the lowest pass through the mountains.

== History ==
The name Cahuenga comes from a Tongva village named Kawé’nga, probably meaning "at the mountain".

It was the site of two minor battles: the Battle of Cahuenga Pass in 1831 (a fight between local settlers and the Mexican-appointed governor and his men; two deaths), and the Battle of Providencia or Second Battle of Cahuenga Pass in 1845 (between locals over whether to secede from Mexico; one horse and one mule killed). Both were on the San Fernando Valley side near present-day Studio City, and cannonballs are still occasionally found during excavations in the area. Along the route of the historic El Camino Real, the historic significance of the pass is also marked by a marker along Cahuenga Blvd. which names the area Paseo de Cahuenga.

== Additional images ==
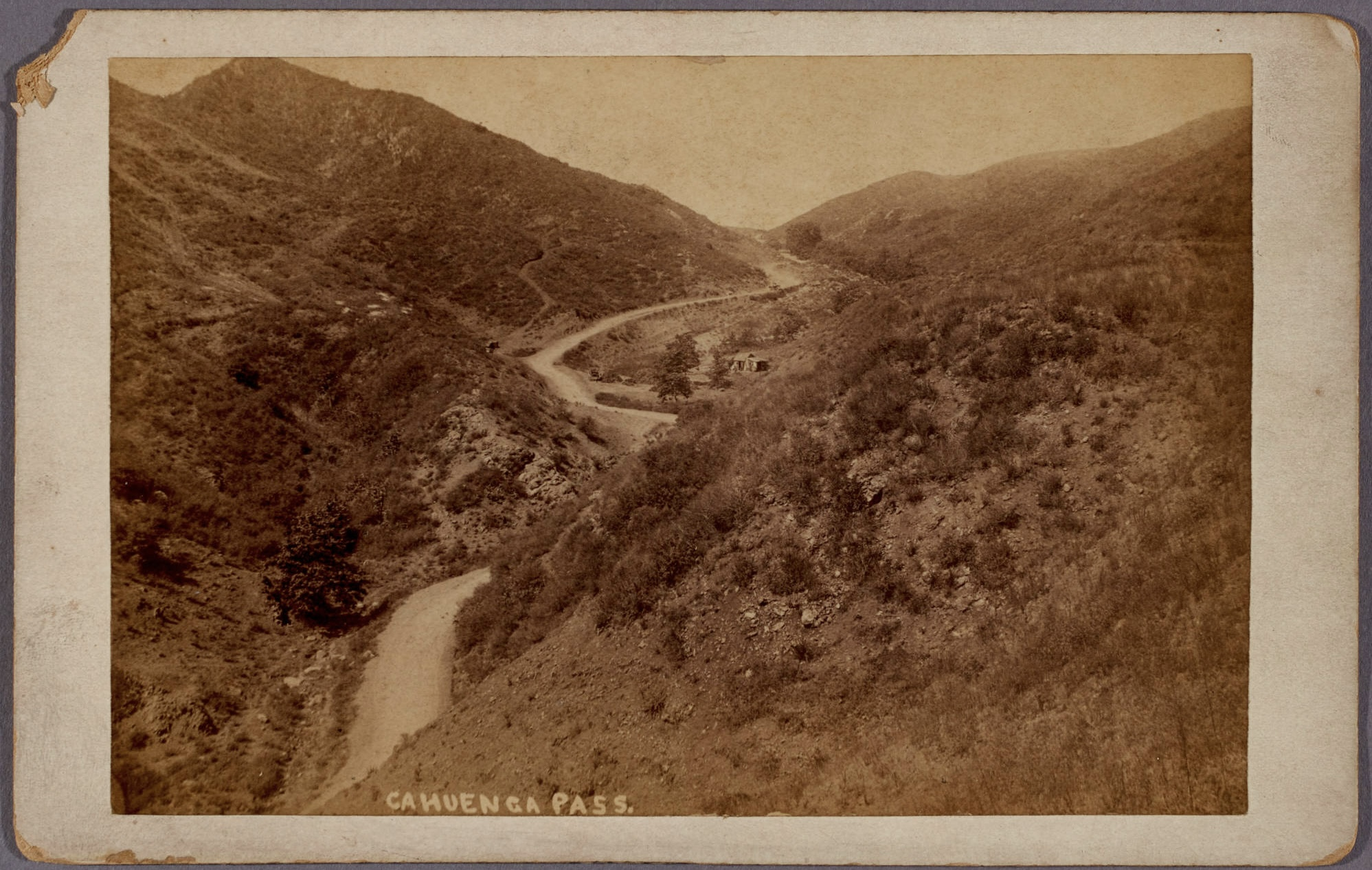
Cahuenga Pass, c. 1888

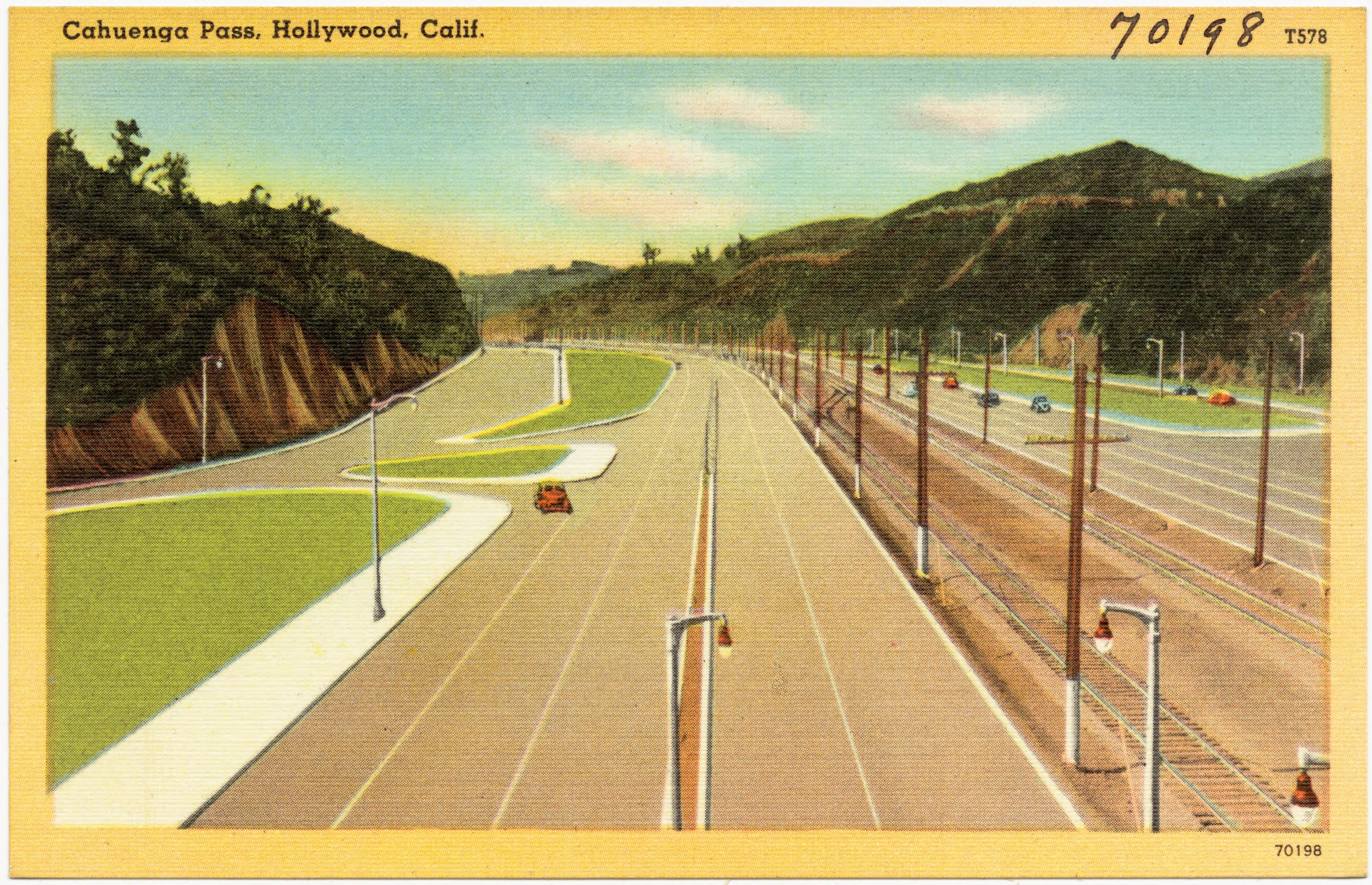
San Fernando Line, c. 1940

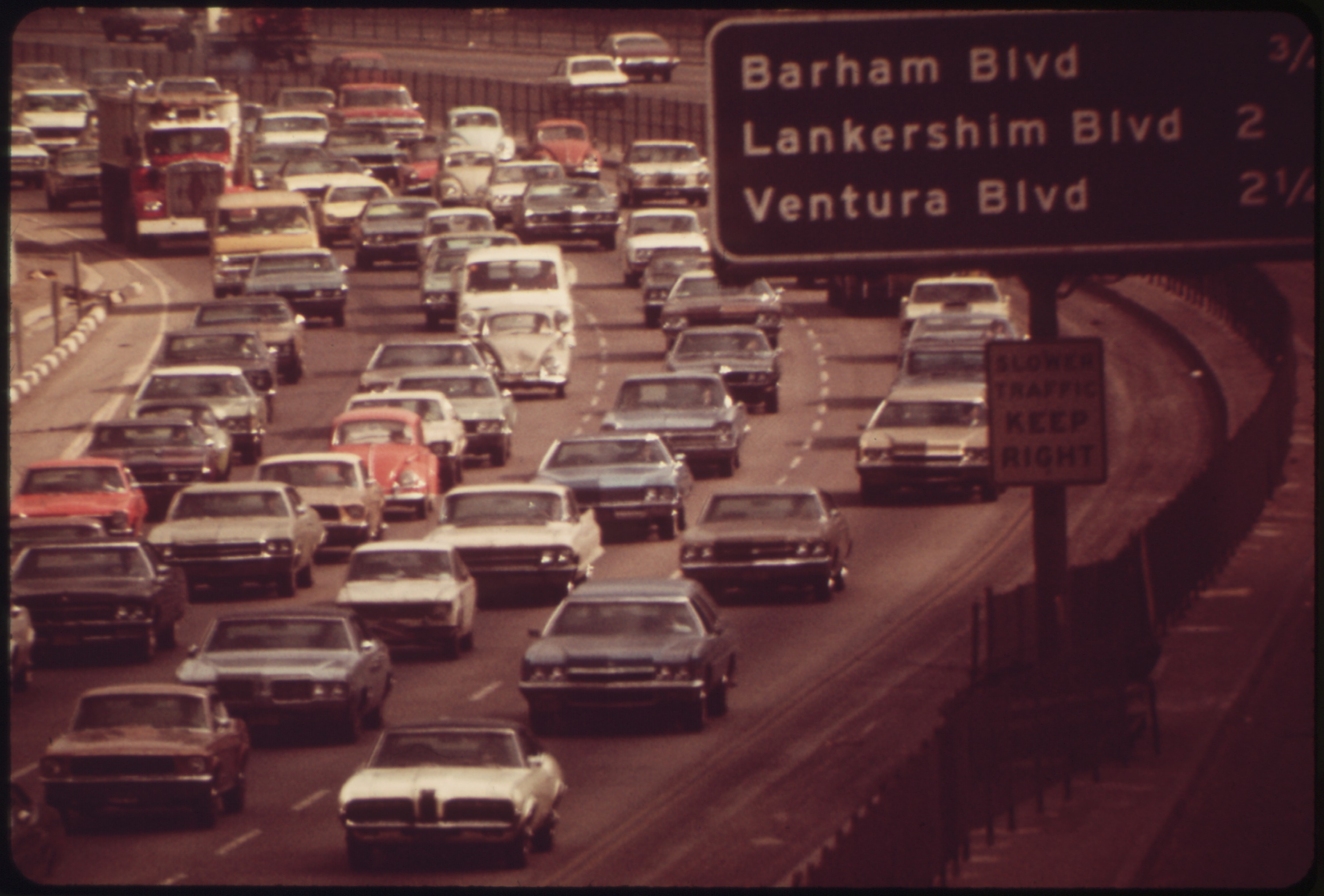
Cahuenga Pass, 1972

== See also ==
- Cahuenga Peak – Mountain in California, United States
- Campo de Cahuenga – Historic house in California, United States
- Rancho Cahuenga – Mexican land grant in California
- List of mountain passes in California
  - Cajon Pass
  - Escondido Summit
  - Newhall Pass
  - Soledad Pass
  - Tehachapi Pass
  - Tejon Pass & Old Tejon Pass
