= Cottonwood Pass (disambiguation) =

Cottonwood Pass is a mountain pass on the Continental Divide of the Americas in the Sawatch Range of Colorado, United States

Cottonwood Pass may also refer to:

- Cottonwood Pass (Arizona), a pass in the Harcuvar Mountains, La Paz County, Arizona, United States
- Cottonwood Pass (Inyo County, California), a pass near Mount Whitney in the Golden Trout Wilderness, Inyo County, California, United States
- Cottonwood Pass (Riverside County, California), a mountain pass in Riverside County, California, United States
- Cottonwood Pass (San Luis Obispo County, California), a mountain pass in San Luis Obispo County, California, United States
- Cottonwood Pass (Clark County, Nevada), a pass in the Bird Spring Range, Clark County, Nevada, United States
- Cottonwood Pass (Wyoming), a mountain pass in Fremont County, Wyoming, United States
- Cottonwood Pass (novel), written by Ron Giles

== See also ==
- Cottonwood (disambiguation)
- List of mountain passes
