= Soledad Canyon =

Canyon in Los Angeles County, California, United States

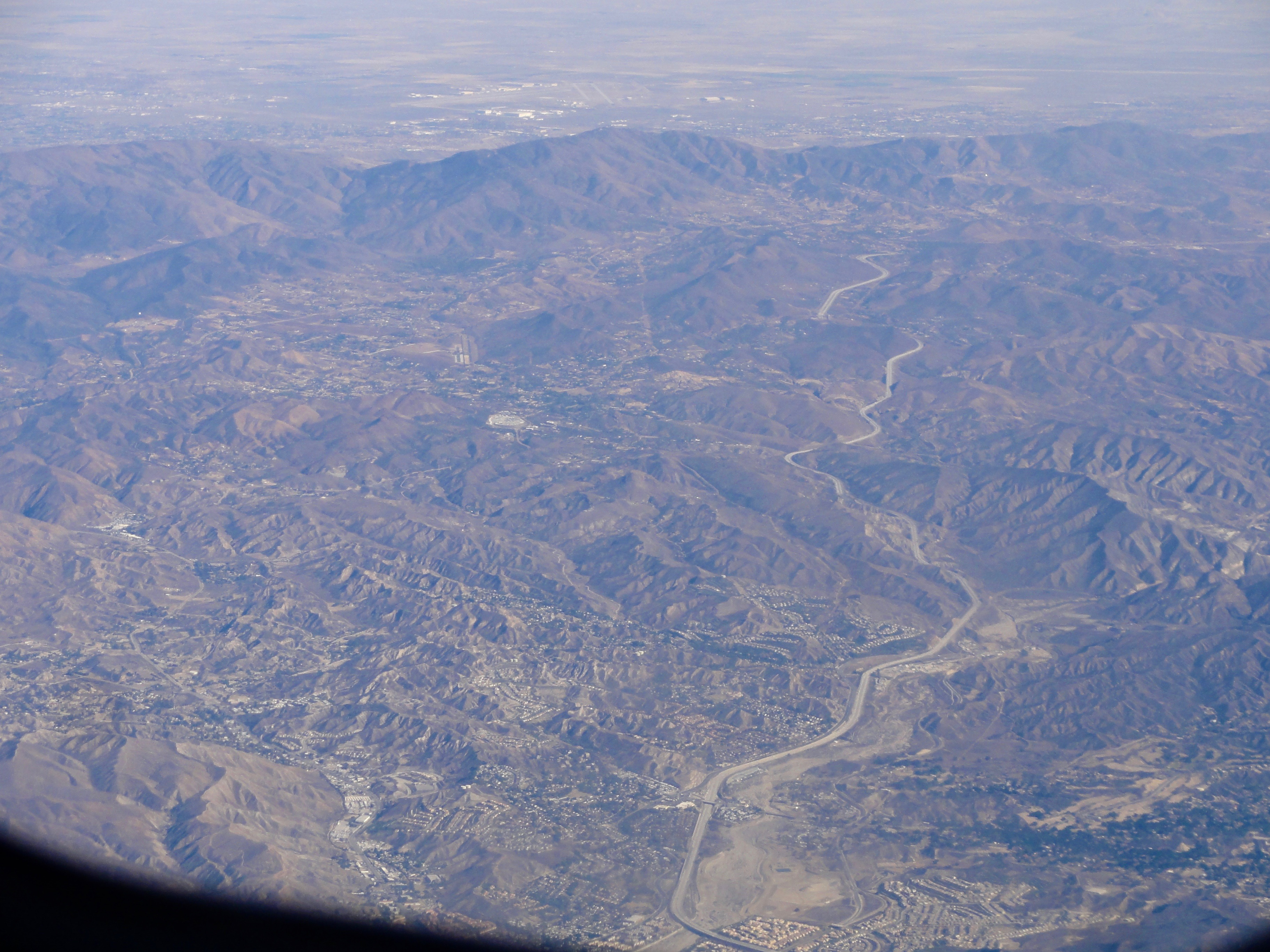
- Aerial view of Soledad Canyon, with the Antelope Valley Freeway winding up through it from Santa Clarita toward Palmdale. Agua Dulce is visible in the center of the image, just left of the freeway.

- Location within the Los Angeles metropolitan area Location within California
- Floor elevation: 1,600–3,209 ft (488–978 m)
- Length: 23 mi (37 km) E-W

Naming
- Native name: Cañón de Soledad (Spanish)

Geography
- Location: Los Angeles County, California, United States
- Population center: Acton and Agua Dulce
- Borders on: Santa Clarita Valley (west); Antelope Valley (northeast)
- Coordinates: 34°25′27″N 118°32′29″W
- Traversed by: Interstate 5, State Route 14
- River: Santa Clara River
- Interactive map of Soledad Canyon

Soledad Canyon is a long narrow canyon/valley located in Los Angeles County, California between the cities of Palmdale and Santa Clarita. It is a part of the Santa Clara River Valley, and extends from the top of Soledad Pass to the open plain of the valley in Santa Clarita. The upstream section of the Santa Clara River runs through it.

== Geography ==
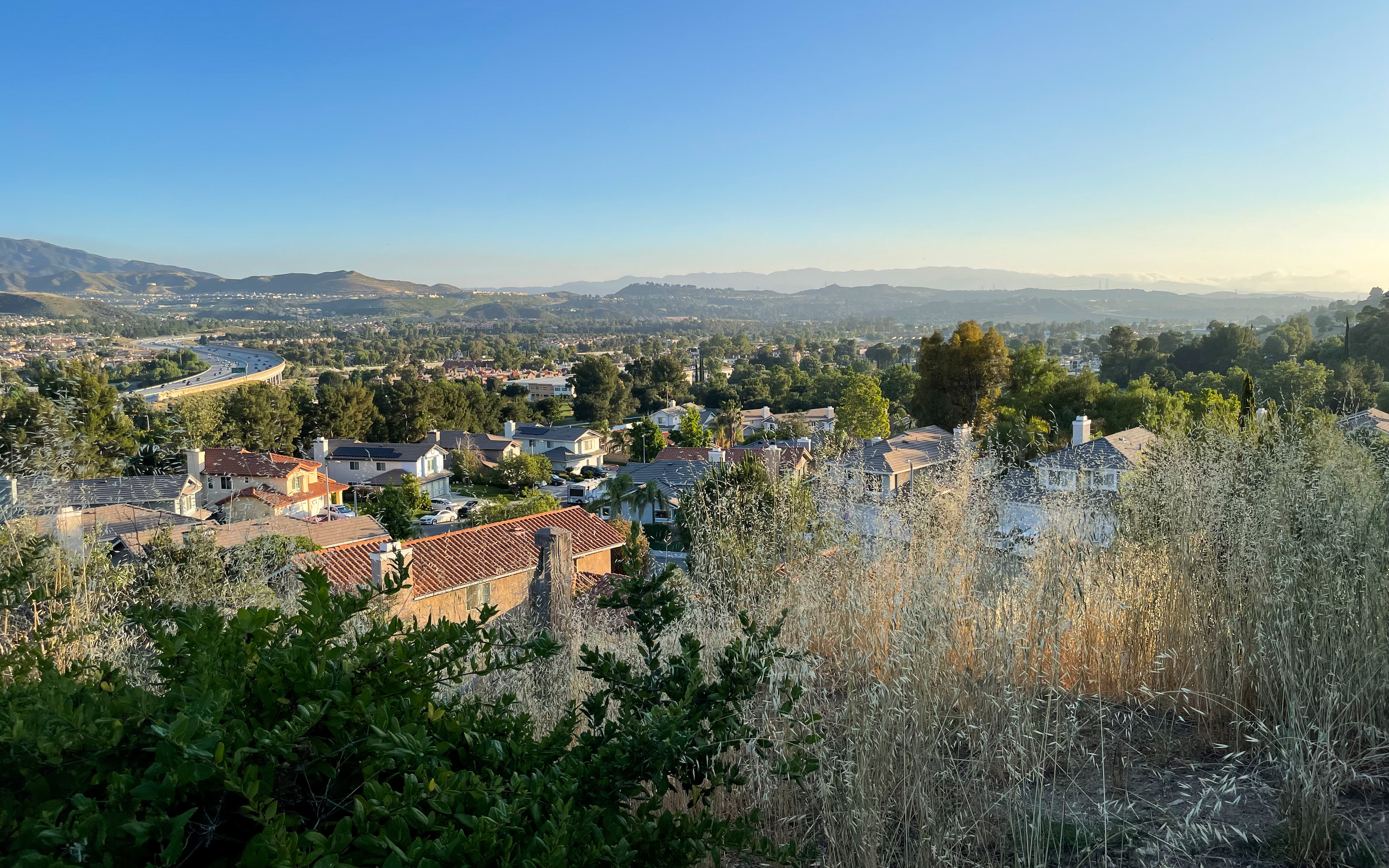
Canyon Country is located in the western portion of Soledad Canyon

The canyon lies between the Sierra Pelona Mountains towards the northwest and the San Gabriel Mountains to the southeast, starting at the northeastern end of Santa Clarita Valley. Traveling northeast through the canyon, it gradually slopes up until the unincorporated community of Acton, near which the Santa Clara River continues east towards its headwaters among the San Gabriel Mountains. Turning north towards Palmdale, the canyon terminates at Soledad Pass, just a few miles south of Lake Palmdale.

Soledad Canyon contains the Santa Clarita neighborhood of Canyon Country. The localities of Vincent, Acton, Ravenna, and Russ. Agua Dulce are located just north of the canyon.

== History ==
Soledad Canyon was a vital part of Los Angeles' transportation history. Transit between Los Angeles and the Central Valley was always difficult–in the "Gold Rush era" and stagecoach days the ride was extremely difficult, almost straight up-and-down through San Fernando Pass, up San Francisquito Canyon, and over Tejon Pass. In 1856, Lieutenant Williamson, on a railroad surveying party, "discovered" that the pass, sometimes named "Williamson Pass", could provide the lower grades to make Los Angeles–Central Valley train travel possible by the roundabout detour all the way to Mojave, and over Tehachapi Pass, almost 70 miles farther than the direct Interstate 5 used today by trucks and autos.

In the mid-1870s, the first rail line was laid down in Soledad Canyon. On September 5, 1876, then president of the Southern Pacific Railroad Charles Crocker drove a golden spike at Lang Southern Pacific Station to complete the San Joaquin Valley Line, the first rail line linking Los Angeles to San Francisco and the First transcontinental railroad.

From 1921 to 1989, the Soledad Canyon Sand and Gravel Mining Project mined a downstream region of the canyon for sand and gravel. In 2000, the Bureau of Land Management awarded two 10-year leases to Transit Mixed Concrete (who later sold the contract to the Cemex Corporation) to mine the site. This resulted in a protracted legal battle between the Bureau of Land Management, the Cemex Corporation, and the City of Santa Clarita. In 2015, the Bureau of Land Management issued a cancellation of the contract, effectively ending almost century of mining within the canyon.

== Transportation ==
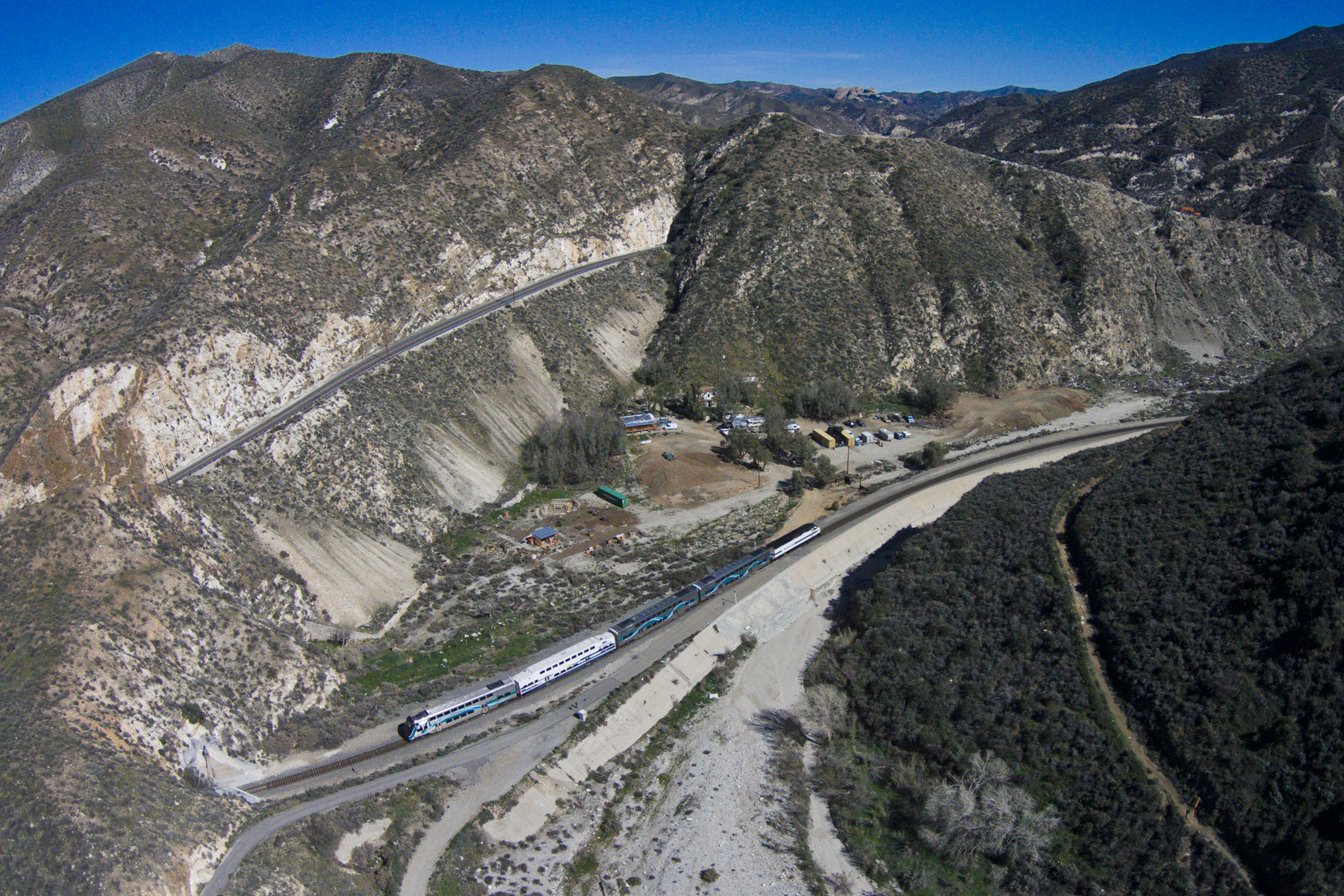
Aerial view of the Santa Clara River as it winds through Soledad Canyon just east of Santa Clarita

Soledad Canyon is traversed by the Soledad Canyon Road. The second-longest street in Santa Clarita, it branches from Sierra Highway and State Route 14 in Acton, heading west into Santa Clarita and serving as a major thoroughfare in the Canyon Country and Saugus neighborhoods, ending at Bouquet Canyon Road where it becomes Valencia Boulevard. Other routes through the canyon include State Route 14 (the Antelope Valley Freeway), and the Metrolink Antelope Valley Line. Travelers on board the Antelope Valley Line are afforded a view of much of the Santa Clara River. Vincent Grade/Acton station serves communities within the canyon.

The canyon was chosen as the state's preferred alternative for the route of the planned California High-Speed Rail line between Burbank Airport and Palmdale. Project maps outline five tunnels to be excavated through the mountainsides, crossing State Route 14 once on an elevated structure. Trains may start running in 2033.

The Pacific Crest Trail traverses the western reaches of the canyon north to south. Descending the southern slopes of the Sierra Pelona Mountains, the trail passes through Agua Dulce and Vasquez Rocks before winding up a mountain ridge. It then descends into the primary reach of Soledad Canyon, passing beneath the tracks of the Antelope Valley Line and crossing the Santa Clara River before continuing up into the San Gabriel Mountains.

== See also ==
- Angeles National Forest
- Escondido Summit
