= Indian Wells, Kern County, California =

Unincorporated community in California, United States

Indian Wells
- Unincorporated community
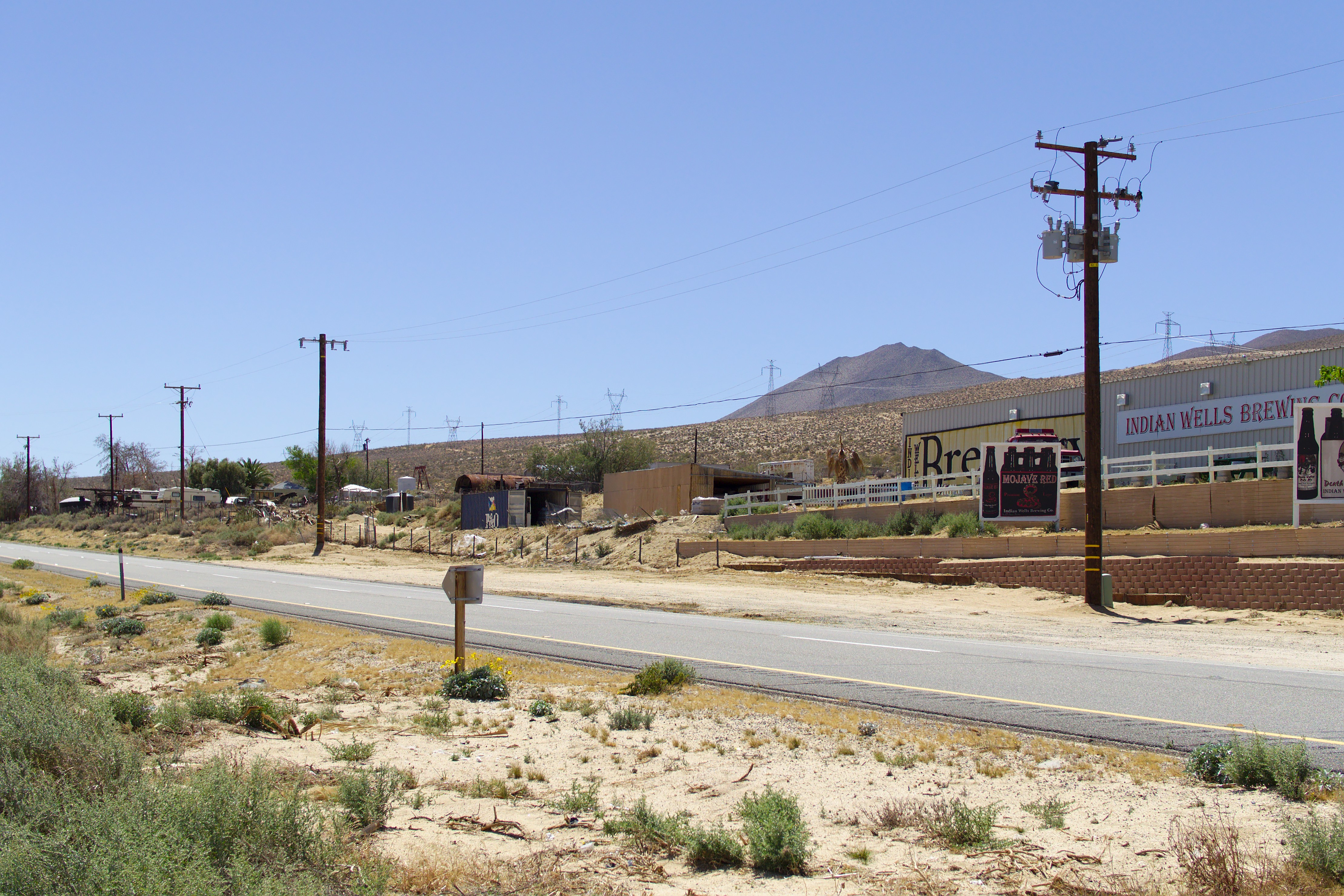
- The community of Indian Wells, view to the southwest across the southbound lanes of California State Route 14

- Location in California Indian Wells (the United States)
- Coordinates: 35°39′55″N 117°52′23″W
- Country: United States
- State: California
- County: Kern
- Elevation: 2,759 ft (841 m)

Indian Wells (formerly Homestead) is an unincorporated community in Kern County, California, United States.

It is located in the Indian Wells Valley, 3.5 miles (5.6 km) west-northwest of Inyokern, on California State Route 14, at an elevation of 2,759 feet (841 m).
