= Monte Cristo Gold Mine =

Gold mine in California, United States

Coordinates: 34°21′11″N 118°05′20″W

The Monte Cristo Gold Mine (Spanish for Mountain of Christ Gold Mine) is a gold mine in the San Gabriel Mountains near Los Angeles, California, USA.

The Monte Cristo Gold Mine is part of the quest for mineral wealth in the San Gabriels. Many of the older tunnels and shafts are closed, and the 100-year-old machinery is no longer in operation. The mine has not been operated since 1942, but for over half a century it bustled with activity.

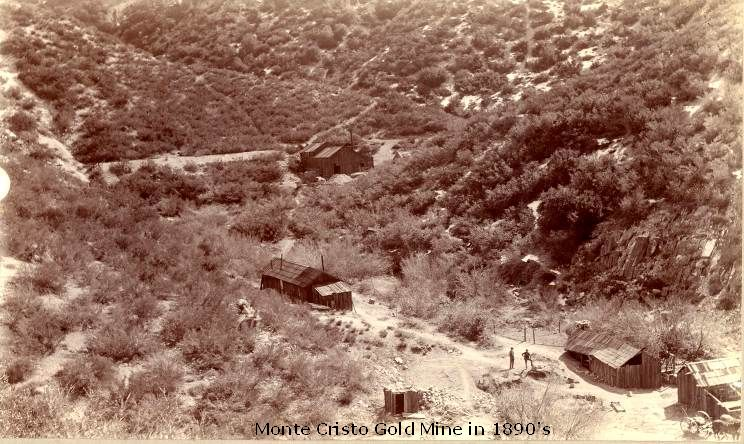
Monte Cristo Gold Mine in the 1890s

The Monte Cristo Gold Mine is on the chaparral-coated slopes of Roundtop Mountain, around Mill Creek and Ootsark Canyon.

The region in the Angeles National Forest of the San Gabriel Mountains has the Monte Cristo Campground and the Monte Cristo Ranger station operated by the United States Forest Service. Although the campground is open to the public, the Monte Cristo Gold Mine is private property and not open to the general public.

== History ==
Legend associates the Monte Cristo Gold Mine with the "Lost Padre" gold mine of mission days. Scholars question that such a mine existed, but the story has nevertheless persisted for over a century. The Pasadena Union on October 29, 1887, made reference to the Lost Padre gold mine and its wealth. It is said that the Indians who manned the mine revolted against the padres and removed all traces of the mine's existence.

The first record of the discovery of gold in Los Angeles county was in 1834. From 1834 to 1838 the San Francisquito Canyon, Placerita Caceta and Santa Feliciana placers were worked by priests from the San Fernando and San Buenaventura missions. The placers of San Gabriel canyon were worked by priests and native Californians until 1848 when gold was discovered at Sutter's Mill by James W. Marshall. Reports of work on gold quartz veins in the Mount Gleason area indicate that the Monte Cristo mine was probably discovered very early.

The Monte Cristo Gold Mine as it is known today first came to light during the Big Tujunga gold excitement of the late 1880s. Just who the prospectors were who located the gold-bearing veins and began the mine is not known. Delos Colby, an owner of the Colby ranch on Coldwater Creek, reconstructed the story as he knew it:

When I first came to these mountains about 24 years ago (1891), the Monte Cristo was being worked by Spanish people. They carried the ore up to a crusher driven by a large water wheel. When they left, I tore the water wheel down and carried some of the timber to my ranch.

Colby's story of the large water wheel gains in interest when compared with an article that appeared in the Los Angeles Semi-Weekly News for January 4, 1867:

A new mining district north of the Tehungo (probably referring to Tujunga) and east of the Soledad district has been formed. Gold bearing quartz of great richness has been discovered. ... Four large arrastres will be in operation in a few days. A water wheel 60 feet (18 m) in diameter is being erected for the purpose of drawing a twenty-stamp mill.

According to some of the old timers, the paper was describing the beginnings of the Monte Cristo Gold Mine.

=== Baker era ===
Around 1893, the property passed into the hands of a Colonel Baker. A company was organized and some $85,000 spent in building a rough wagon road from Acton up Aliso Canyon, over Mill Creek Summit, and down to the Monte Cristo Gold Mine. Heavy mining machinery was transported in and assembled, and buildings were erected.

The first account of any extensive work in the Monte Cristo Gold Mine appeared in 1895. Development at that time included several 5-foot (1.5 m) to 30-foot (9.1 m) adits, and three shafts, 10 feet (3.0 m) to 40 feet (12 m) deep. The rock was crushed in a four-stamp mill with 600-pound stamps, and a 5-foot (1.5 m) Huntington mill. Two of the above-mentioned mines were free milling and two produced sulfide ore. Five men were engaged on the property at the time, mainly on development work. The owner in 1895 was R.E. Hudson.

=== Fuller era ===
A few years later, J. J. Haish, owner of a store in Acton, grubstaked Captain Elbridge Fuller who, with a succession of partners, ruled the Monte Cristo Gold Mine for some 20 years of stormy personal controversy and marginal mining success. It seems that Fuller could never get along with his partners, and one by one they either sold out, were driven away, or met with foul play.

Colby related an incident that appears typical of the Fuller era:

Fuller entered another partnership with two brothers, Hudson by name, but seems to have taken into his confidence another party named Hutchinson. The latter quarreled with the Hudson's who threatened him and drove him off. Fuller and Hutchinson then turned against the Hudson's. On a trip to Los Angeles and Pasadena, they plotted to kill or drive the Hudson's from Monte Cristo Gold Mine. After a drinking spree, they arrived at the mouth of the Arroyo Seco where, finding themselves in need of more liquor to bolster their courage, they stopped. Fuller returned to the city to replenish the liquor supply. Upon returning to the Arroyo, he found Hutchinson dead, his head blown off with a gun.

A short while later, the Hudson's withdrew from the partnership, leaving Fuller sole possessor of the Monte Cristo Gold Mine. In 1897, carefree as he was, he suddenly departed for the Yukon to join the Klondike Gold Rush. Upon his empty-handed return two years later, he induced a man by the name of Hauser to supply $1,500 in order to start work once again at the Monte Cristo Gold Mine. The property was then recorded in Hauser's name. When the money was expended, Fuller turned on his partner and went to Los Angeles to swear that the improvement work required by mining law had not been completed. Hauser therefore lost his lease, and the conniving Fuller once again "jumped" the claim to become sole owner.

Fuller's last years at the Monte Cristo Gold Mine were trying ones. Mining proved unprofitable, so he bought a string of mules and did hauling work for his mountain neighbors, Captain Loomis on Alder Creek and Delos Colby in Coldwater Canyon. Around 1915, Fuller finally left for good.

=== Carlisle era ===
Fred W. Carlisle then "jumped" the claim, and remained in control of the Monte Cristo Gold Mine until he died in 1946. Carlisle had been assayer in the Randsburg Mining District, where he had reportedly suffered financial losses, and came to Mill Creek seeking to revive his expiring fortunes. Under Carlisle, the Monte Cristo Gold Mine reached the zenith of its activity, during the years from 1923 to 1928. Gold-bearing ore was recovered from two groups of quartz veins about a thousand feet apart. To tap these six tunnels were bored, two of them reaching back 425 feet (130 m) into the mountainside. New machinery, including a Blaker Crusher and a portable compressor, was laboriously hauled in. According to the California State Mine Bureau, a total yield of $70,000 was recovered from the Monte Cristo Gold Mine in 1927, its peak year. Old-timers, however, insist the figure was more like $200,000, and that the difference was stolen by "high graders."

In 1927 the Monte Cristo Gold Mine property consisted of ten claims, The development work consisted of two adits and a shaft 133 feet (41 m) deep. The upper adit was 275 feet (84 m) long. Four ore shoots, 35 feet (11 m) by 3 feet (0.91 m), were found and stopped to the surface with a reported recovery of $70,000. At that time gold was selling around $20 an ounce. The values on the lower adit were reported to be $10.00 per ton or 1/2 ounce of gold per ton. The equipment used at that time was a 6-inch (150 mm) by 12-inch (300 mm) Blake crusher and a 5-foot (1.5 m) Huntington mill. In the late 1920s, Mr. Carlisle installed a small roasting and cyanide plant to process the ore, but later the ore was shipped to Acton for processing. The Huntington mill was scrapped at this time.

In 1937 Carlisle divided the property into two parts and leased to separate parties. The eastern part, consisting of seventeen claims, was leased to W. W. Hartman. Of four parallel veins on the lease the only one developed was the Monte Cristo Gold Mine vein. The upper adit extended north 425 feet (130 m). At 87 feet (27 m) from the portal a winze was sunk 50 feet (15 m). A drift went 60 feet (18 m) north with a raise to the adit level. The lower adit extended 425 feet (130 m) north with a 25-foot (7.6 m) crosscut west at the face.

A portable compressor was in operation and five men were working. The west vein area, leased to W. W. Gilkey and Crouse L. Elgin, is situated 1,200 feet (370 m) west of the 17-Monte Cristo Gold Mine vein. The upper level on this vein consisted of an adit extending north 130 feet (40 m). At 40 feet (12 m) a winze was sunk 30 feet (9.1 m) and a small underhand stope, 16 feet (4.9 m) by 21 feet (6.4 m), produced ore valued from $18.00 to $40.00 per ton. Fifty feet below, a crosscut was driven to the vein, and a drift along the vein extended north 50 feet (15 m). The last 15 feet (4.6 m) showed a vein 4 feet (1.2 m) to 6 feet (1.8 m) wide with 3 feet (0.91 m) of quartz and sulfides. In 1937 four men were employed in the lower tunnel.

After that, the Monte Cristo Gold Mine reverted to its familiar pattern of promise followed by frustration. Several promising "pay streaks" were hit, only to fizzle out just as they appeared to spell "bonanza." Carlisle, hard-pressed to make ends meet, was obliged to suspend operations for several years at a time. During the mid-1930s, he leased the east and west veins to different operators, the only time the Monte Cristo Gold Mine was not worked as a single unit. From 1935 to 1942, the mine was worked only intermittently, and in the latter year it ceased operations from the old mill site.

=== Kerstein era ===
In the 1940s the Monte Cristo Gold Mine was sold to the family of the present owners, Bob and Susana Kerstein. The property was acquired by their family in the early 1940s. They own 25.66 acres (103,800 m^{2}) of private property in addition to the 525 acres (2.12 km^{2}) of contiguous mining claims which surround the famous mining property. All of the mining claims have been registered and kept current with the Bureau of Land Management and the County Recorder's office for almost 100 years. The Monte Cristo Gold Mine has a strict no trespassing policy. There are property managers on duty who maintain the structures and the mining claims, as well as warding off trespassers and possible claim jumpers. If and when gold reaches a high enough price, the famous mine could one day be up and operational again.

=== Mohler era ===
In the fall of 2018, the Monte Cristo and its associated claims were acquired by Lars Mohler and Adria Mohler, husband and wife. Plans are under way to restore some of the historic features and artifacts to a state of arrested decay. Preservation of the mine site and conservation of the land and native species are the goals. Deer, bear, mountain lion, bobcat, fox, frog and rattlesnake make their home in the surrounding area. Although the Monte Cristo was once a gold producing mine, recent testing has shown it to be lacking in any retrievable riches. Assay shows <0.125 oz/ton. This means you would have to mine, crush and process 8 tons of rock to get one ounce of gold. The Monte Cristo Mine is private property. The gate on the road is a clear boundary line and the public is asked to respect the privacy of the owners and caretakers.
