= Angeles Forest Highway =

Highway in California

Angeles Forest Highway

- Map of southern California with Angeles Forest Highway highlighted in red

Route information
- Maintained by the Los Angeles County Department of Public Works
- Length: 25 mi (40 km)
- Existed: 1941–present
- History: Proposed in 1928, over the San Gabriel Mountains; County route: 1963–present

Major junctions
- South end: SR 2 in Angeles National Forest
- North end: SR 14 at Soledad Pass

Location
- Country: United States
- State: California
- County: Los Angeles

Highway system
- Forest Highway System; State highways in California; Interstate; US; State; Scenic; History; Pre‑1964; Unconstructed; Deleted; Freeways
- County routes in California
← CR N2	CR N3	→ CR N4

The Angeles Forest Highway is a 25-mile (40 km) road over the San Gabriel Mountains in Los Angeles County, California. It connects the Los Angeles Basin with the Antelope Valley and western Mojave Desert. Maintained by the Los Angeles County Department of Public Works, the highway is designated as County Route N3 (CR N3) or Forest Highway 59 (FH 59); the route numbers are unsigned, but noted on many maps. This is also the route for the proposed State Route 249, but the California Department of Transportation (Caltrans) has no plans to take it over and officially adopt it as part of the state highway system.

Running between State Route 2 and State Route 14, the Angeles Forest Highway passes through the Angeles National Forest, and a western section of the San Gabriel Mountains National Monument. It is used primarily for recreation, although a significant portion of its traffic comes from commuters living in the Antelope Valley. It a well-known alternate to State Route 14 in this regard, and is known for its numerous high-speed crashes.

== Route description ==
The first section of the Angeles Forest Highway north from Los Angeles is the southern end of the Angeles Crest Highway (California State Route 2), which follows the Arroyo Seco and the powerlines north from La Cañada. At Dark Canyon, the powerlines diverge over the ridge while the paved highway follows the canyon to Georges Gap, just past the Clear Creek Vista.

=== Clear Creek Segment ===
The Angeles Forest Highway begins its journey north at Clear Creek Junction, 0.9 miles (1.4 km) past Georges Gap, while the Angeles Crest Highway continues on east toward Red Box. At this junction are the Clear Creek Information Center on the right, the Clear Creek Station of the Forest Service on the left, and the fire road which is the trailhead for Mt. Josephine across the street from the station. There is also a trail leading to Switzer Picnic Area which begins here.

If you stop and park at the Info Center, you can see the trace of the San Gabriel Fault by looking east up the Arroyo Seco toward Red Box. This alignment of features is a result of erosion of the rocks softened by movement along the fault. The gap also separates the watershed of the Arroyo Seco from that of Clear Creek which flows into Big Tujunga Creek.

The road continues to follow the Clear Creek drainage while contouring around the southwestern slope of Josephine Peak, which can be referred to as Mount Josephine or Mt. Josephine. It used to have a fire lookout tower that was visible from the valley floor, but now has the Pines Picnic Area, looking out over the fault trace northwest through Clear Creek. The highway then leaves Clear Creek and enters the Big Tujunga Creek drainage as it crosses the Josephine ridge and turns northeastward.

=== Big Tujunga Creek Segment ===
Once the highway meets the Big Tujunga Road, its character changes. This section between the junction and the bridge over the Narrows is the most precipitous, is the most prone to rock slides, has the most rescues from people climbing down its slopes to the waterholes, and features more wildflowers than other sections along the route, such as the Spanish broom. The roadcuts show off the light-colored Mt. Josephine granodiorite.

After crossing the Big Tujunga Narrows Bridge, originally named the Armstrong Bridge, which rises 275' above the canyon bottom, there is a large turnout on the east side of the road. Floods periodically scour the canyon and debris fills the reservoir behind the dam lower down. The vegetation was recently destroyed by fire.

Next the road passes through a tunnel, sometimes marked on maps as the Singing Springs Tunnel. At the tunnel's south entrance are rocks of banded gneiss, 1,700 million years old, some of the oldest rock found in the San Gabriel Mountains. The road cuts through a ridge separating the Big Tujunga from its tributary, Mill Creek. From this point, the Angeles Forest Highway follows the west side of Mill Creek.

=== Mill Creek Segment ===
Immediately on the other side of the tunnel on the west side of the highway is the Hidden Springs Picnic Ground, a rest stop with overlooks and use trails. The trailhead for the Fall Creek Trail is 500' up the road also on the west side. It is marked with a brown hiking sign, but offers no parking. The hillsides once were covered with chamise, manzanita, and yucca but the vegetation as well as the Hidden Springs Cafe were destroyed by the 2009 Station Fire.

Monte Cristo Station (Named after the Monte Cristo Gold Mine is a stop on the Big Tujunga Canyon Auto Tour. Gold mining equipment used for hard rock and streamside mining is displayed here. One building survived the Station Fire.

At the westside turnout of Baughman Springs, is an exposure of white-colored anorthosite, a rock 1.22 billion years old, which is also found on the lunar highlands. Parish's rabbitbrush (Ericameria parishii), a late bloomer, begins to be seen as the road rises.

The highway then crests Mill Creek Summit, 4,910 ft (1,500 m), the highest point along the Angeles Forest Highway. There was once another convenient rest stop with shade, restrooms and picnic tables, but were all destroyed by the Station Fire in August 2009. As of May 2016, the site had since been rebuilt.

=== Aliso Canyon Segment ===
After Mill Creek Summit, the Angeles Forest Highway crosses a drainage divide. From here on all the water goes into Aliso Creek, the headwaters of the Santa Clara River. Aliso is Spanish for sycamore. The road now follows the east side of Aliso Canyon. At Aliso Springs Picnic Ground, there are no sycamores, only canyon oaks. After the Picnic Ground, there is a road cut showing the banded Lowe granodiorite. It is best seen when driving south up the grade where, in this case, it would be before the picnic area.

=== Kentucky Springs Canyon Segment ===
After the junction with Aliso Canyon Road, the highway leaves Aliso Creek and crosses a ridge to Kentucky Springs Canyon. The straight-away section on alluvium, approaching the Mt. Emma Road and the Angeles National Forest boundary, goes through pinyon pine and California juniper woodland. In the springtime, flannelbush and goldenbush bloom in this area. After the boundary sign, the pinyon pines disappear and Great Basin sagebrush becomes more dominant.

On the west side is an Edison Company substation, the goal of the original pole line road. Power is brought in from sources north and east of the mountain range and transferred on into the Los Angeles basin.

On its final leg approaching Vincent Junction, the Angeles Forest Highway crosses the wide Soledad Pass, 3,220 feet (980 m), also used by the railroad and California State Route 14 (Antelope Valley Freeway). Drainage on the other side of the pass goes to Little Rock Creek and then out to the interior basin of the Mojave Desert. One geologist suggested that the headwaters of the Santa Clara River may eventually cut through to the desert here.

== History ==
The first road across the San Gabriels in this direction was built by the Edison Company to service their powerlines in the 1920s. The pole line road went from Eagle Rock to Vincent. In 1928, the Los Angeles County Board of Supervisors approved a plan for construction of the Angeles Forest Highway. It was not completed until 1941. It was defined as a county highway in 1963.

== Major intersections ==
The entire route is in Los Angeles County.

Location	mi	km	Destinations	Notes
Angeles National Forest	0.00	0.00	SR 2 – Los Angeles, Big Pines	Southern terminus of Angeles Forest Highway
Angeles National Forest			Big Tujunga Canyon Road	
Angeles National Forest			Upper Big Tujunga Canyon Road	
Angeles National Forest			Aliso Canyon Road	
Angeles National Forest			Mt Emma Road	
Vincent			SR 14 – Los Angeles, Palmdale	Northern terminus of Angeles Forest Highway; exit 30 on SR 14
1.000 mi = 1.609 km; 1.000 km = 0.621 mi

== In popular culture ==
- Several features of the highway are mentioned or parodied in the works of The Firesign Theater, notably during Nick Danger's car driving sequence in How Can You Be in Two Places at Once When You're Not Anywhere at All
