= Soledad Canyon Sand and Gravel Mining Project =

Mining project in Los Angeles County, California, U.S.

The Soledad Canyon Sand and Gravel Mining Project is a mining project in Northern Los Angeles County east of the city of Santa Clarita, California, United States. First mined in 1921, the property was mined by Curtis Sand and Gravel from the early 1960s until 1989, when, as a result of a legal settlement, the Bureau of Land Management put two 10-year leases to mine sand and gravel from the site out to competitive bid. The contracts were awarded to Transit Mixed Concrete, which eventually sold them to Cemex Corporation.

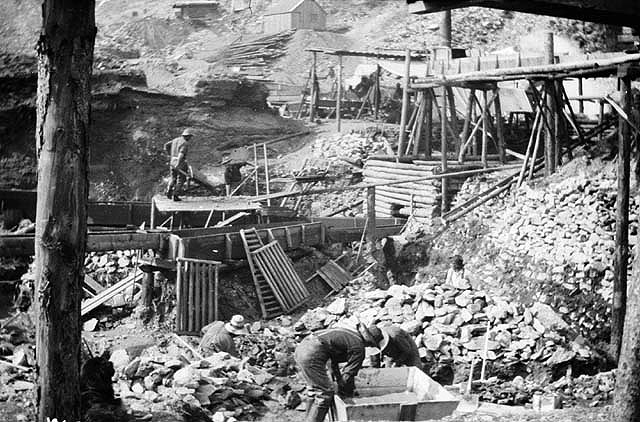
mining camp

The former operator, Curtis Sand & Gravel, sued in an unsuccessful attempt to overturn the contracts. After Curtis' legal options had been exhausted, the City of Santa Clarita started questioning the validity of Transit Mixed's contracts as part of a public relations campaign to cause the mining contracts to be cancelled. The BLM approved the project in 2000 by issuing a Record of Decision after a review process which lasted over 10 years. The city challenged the approval in court, alleging that the project would spoil air quality, increase traffic on the 14 Freeway and town roads and would threaten endangered fish and wildlife species. Eventually, Cemex, with the United States Bureau of Land Management (BLM) intervening, successfully sued the County of Los Angeles for unreasonable delays. The result was a "consent decree" or settlement enjoining the county from further interference, and requiring the county to issue a permit and certify the EIR for the federally-approved project in 2004. A 2008 United States District Court decision awarded Cemex attorney fees of $524,476.60 from the City of Santa Clarita. In the decision, Judge A. Howard Matz responded to the City's claim that its action against decertifying the CEQA decision on the Soledad Canyon Sand and Gravel Mining Project constituted "a CEQA Action (sic) as permitted under California law" by pointing out that "every party seeking to enforce CEQA or any comparable environmental statute - - indeed, all statutes, even anti-discrimination laws - - has the duty to comply with applicable professional and judicial requirements. Merely purporting to promote or protect a societal "good" or interest reflected in a statute does not immunize a plaintiff from the consequences of litigation abuse".

The city's PR campaign eventually forced Cemex to agree to a "truce" with the city which was intended to "explore mutually acceptable solutions that will result in a win-win for both parties."

During this time, the city and Cemex attempted to pass a number of bills through Congress to prevent mining in Soledad Canyon through California's 25th district Representative Howard Buck McKeon, but none were successful. The first Bill, sponsored in the Senate by Barbara Boxer (D-CA) and co-sponsored by Senator Dianne Feinstein (D-CA) is S.771, the Soledad Canyon Settlement Act from 2013. S.771 and a subsequent piece of legislation sought to engage Congress to direct the Bureau of Land Management to sell vacant land in the desert near Victorville, California, the proceeds of which would go to Cemex Corporation to buy out their interest in mining Soledad Canyon. A subsequent bill (S. 2938), with its House version successfully passed, was held up in the Senate for environmental reasons by Martin Heinrich, Democratic senator from New Mexico. Heinrich objected to selling public lands as a budget offset to pay for the buyout of the mining contracts.

On August 28, 2015 the BLM issued a cancellation of the contracts, and the decision is currently being appealed by CEMEX. Cemex also filed a petition for stay which along with the Notice of Appeal, is to be heard in an administrative capacity by the Interior Board of Land Appeals. Congressman Steve Knight (politician) (who replaced Buck McKeon as representative of California's 25th District in 2014) "welcomed an announcement by Cemex that [the BLM] will cancel their mining contracts in the Santa Clarita Valley". Any decision by the Interior Board of Land Appeals is expected to be appealed to the courts.
