= California State Route 14 =

State highway in Los Angeles and Kern counties in California, United States

State Route 14
- SR 14 highlighted in red

Route information
- Maintained by Caltrans
- Length: 116.645 mi (187.722 km)
- Existed: 1964 renumbering (from US 6)–present

Major junctions
- South end: I-5 in Los Angeles
- SR 138 from Palmdale to Lancaster; SR 58 near Mojave; SR 178 near Indian Wells
- North end: US 395 near Inyokern

Location
- Country: United States
- State: California
- Counties: Los Angeles, Kern

Highway system
- State highways in California; Interstate; US; State; Scenic; History; Pre‑1964; Unconstructed; Deleted; Freeways
← SR 13	→ I-15

State Route 14 (SR 14) is a north–south state highway in the U.S. state of California that connects Los Angeles to the northern Mojave Desert. The southern portion of the highway is signed as the Antelope Valley Freeway. Its southern terminus is at Interstate 5 (I-5, Golden State Freeway) in the Los Angeles neighborhoods of Granada Hills and Sylmar just immediately to the south of the border of the city of Santa Clarita. SR 14's northern terminus is at U.S. Route 395 (US 395) near Inyokern. Legislatively, the route extends south of I-5 to SR 1 in the Pacific Palisades area of Los Angeles; however, the portion south of the junction with I-5 has not been constructed. The southern part of the constructed route is a busy commuter freeway serving and connecting the cities of Santa Clarita, Palmdale, and Lancaster to the rest of the Greater Los Angeles area. The northern portion, from Vincent (south of Palmdale) to US 395, is legislatively named the Aerospace Highway, as the highway serves Edwards Air Force Base, once one of the primary landing strips for NASA's Space Shuttle, as well as the Naval Air Weapons Station China Lake that supports military aerospace research, development and testing. This section is rural, following the line between the hot Mojave desert and the forming Sierra Nevada mountain range. Most of SR 14 is loosely paralleled by a rail line originally built by the Southern Pacific Railroad, and was once the primary rail link between Los Angeles and Northern California. While no longer a primary rail line, the southern half of this line is now used for the Antelope Valley Line of the Metrolink commuter rail system.

Linked with US 395, this road also connects Los Angeles with such places as Mammoth Mountain, Mono Lake, Yosemite National Park and Reno, Nevada. SR 14 was part of US 6 prior to truncation in 1964, when US 6 was a coast-to-coast route from Long Beach to Provincetown, Massachusetts. The non-freeway segment of SR 14 from Silver Queen Road north of Rosamond to Mojave is known as Sierra Highway, as is the old routing between I-5 and Silver Queen Road where SR 14 has been moved to a newer freeway alignment. Portions of SR 14 remain signed with names associated with US 6, including Midland Trail, Theodore Roosevelt Highway, and Grand Army of the Republic Highway.

== Route description ==
Route 14 is defined as follows in section 314 of the California Streets and Highways Code:

Route 14 is from:
(a) Route 1 north of the intersection of Sunset Boulevard northwest of Santa Monica to Route 5 near Tunnel Station.
(b) Route 5 at Los Angeles near Tunnel Station to Route 58.
(c) Route 58 to Route 395 near Little Lake via the vicinity of Antelope Valley.

Route 14 was never fully constructed to extend south to near Sunset Boulevard as it is defined.

SR 14 is part of the California Freeway and Expressway System, and is part of the National Highway System, a network of highways that are considered essential to the country's economy, defense, and mobility by the Federal Highway Administration.

=== Antelope Valley Freeway ===
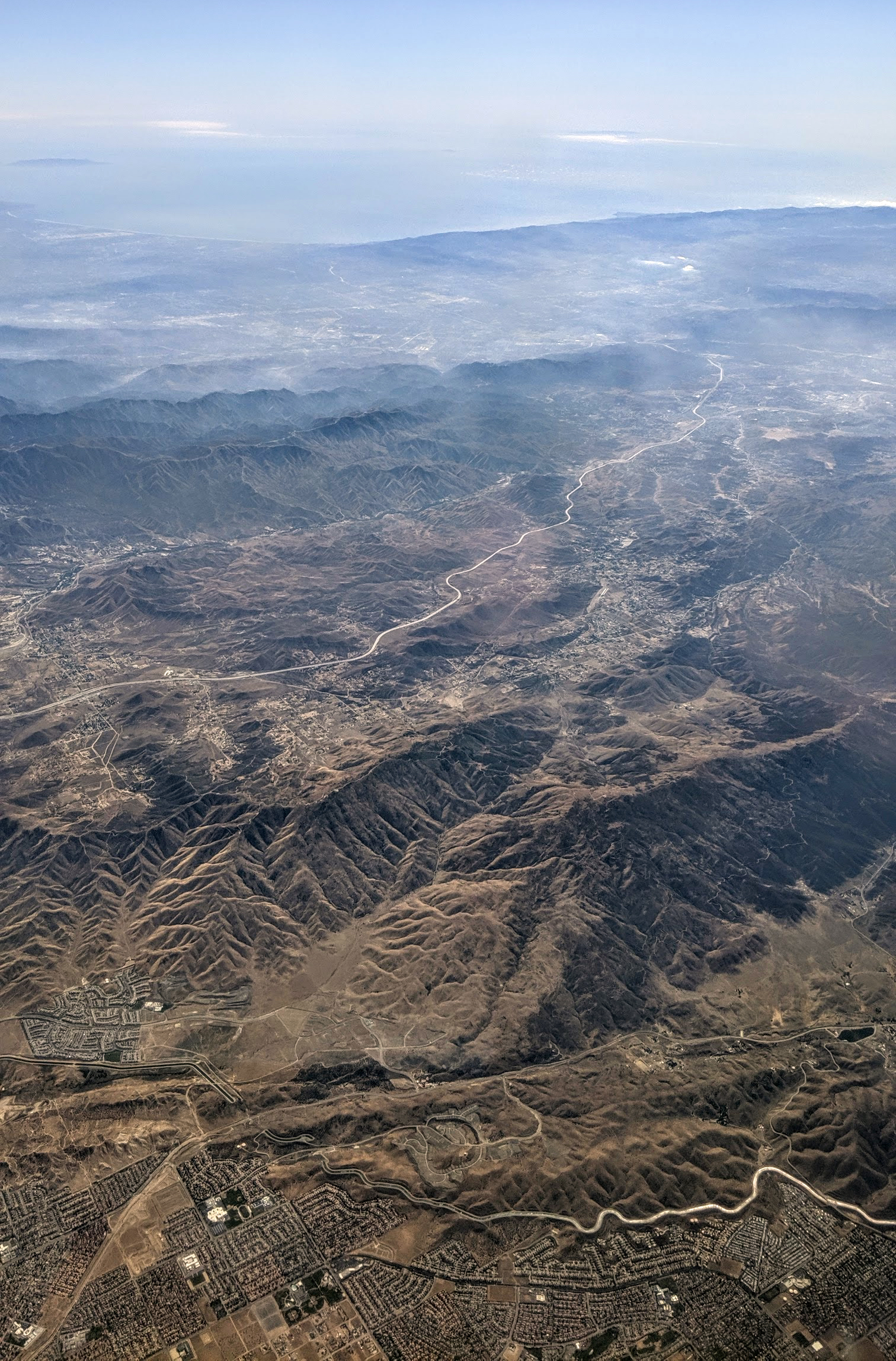
Antelope Valley Freeway through the San Gabriel Mountains, with California Aqueduct at Palmdale in the foreground

The southern portion of the freeway, from I-5 to the Avenue D exit near Lancaster, has been designated the Antelope Valley Freeway by the state legislature. The Antelope Valley Freeway begins in the Santa Susana Mountains at the Newhall Pass interchange by splitting from the Golden State Freeway (I-5). This is the busiest portion of the route with an annual average daily traffic (AADT) count of 169,000 vehicles per day. The freeway forms much of the eastern boundary of Santa Clarita along its route. Past Santa Clarita, the road continues northeast and crosses the Sierra Pelona Mountains and western San Gabriel Mountains via the canyon of the seasonal Santa Clara River. The ascent is mostly rugged and rural terrain, with only two small towns along the ascent, first Agua Dulce and later Acton. In Agua Dulce, the freeway forms the southern boundary of Vasquez Rocks Park, a county park. The highway crests the Sierra Pelona Mountains via Escondido Summit, at an elevation of 3,258 feet (993 m), before descending and passing by Acton to the north. The highway then crests the San Gabriel Mountains via Soledad Pass, at an elevation of 3,209 feet (978 m). The route of the highway through the mountains loosely parallels that of the Metrolink Antelope Valley Line.

After cresting both mountain passes, the highway descends into the Antelope Valley, a large valley within the Mojave Desert. The highway crosses Angeles Forest Highway and the California Aqueduct in the descent. SR 14 serves as the primary north–south thoroughfare for the communities of Palmdale and Lancaster. Between Palmdale Boulevard (County Route N2) and Avenue D in Lancaster, SR 14 runs concurrently with SR 138.

=== Aerospace Highway ===
From the Pearblossom Highway exit south of Palmdale to its northern terminus at US 395 near Inyokern, SR 14 has been designated the Aerospace Highway. Between Pearblossom Highway and Avenue S, there is a vista point overlooking Lake Palmdale, which features a historic plaque that honors aviation accomplishments including the Space Shuttle, breaking the sound barrier and the speed record. The freeway passes the Los Angeles–Kern county line at Avenue A, and continues to run north through Rosamond and Mojave. In Rosamond, the highway passes close to Edwards Air Force Base, which was often used as one of the main landing strips for NASA's Space Shuttle, and as the base for the X-15 and many other air and spacecraft.

The freeway portion terminates just south of Mojave, where SR 14 serves as the main street and runs through the downtown area. To the east of the route is Mojave Air & Space Port, home to the National Test Pilot School and SpaceShipOne, the first privately funded human spaceflight, as well as a vast airplane graveyard; all are visible from SR 14.

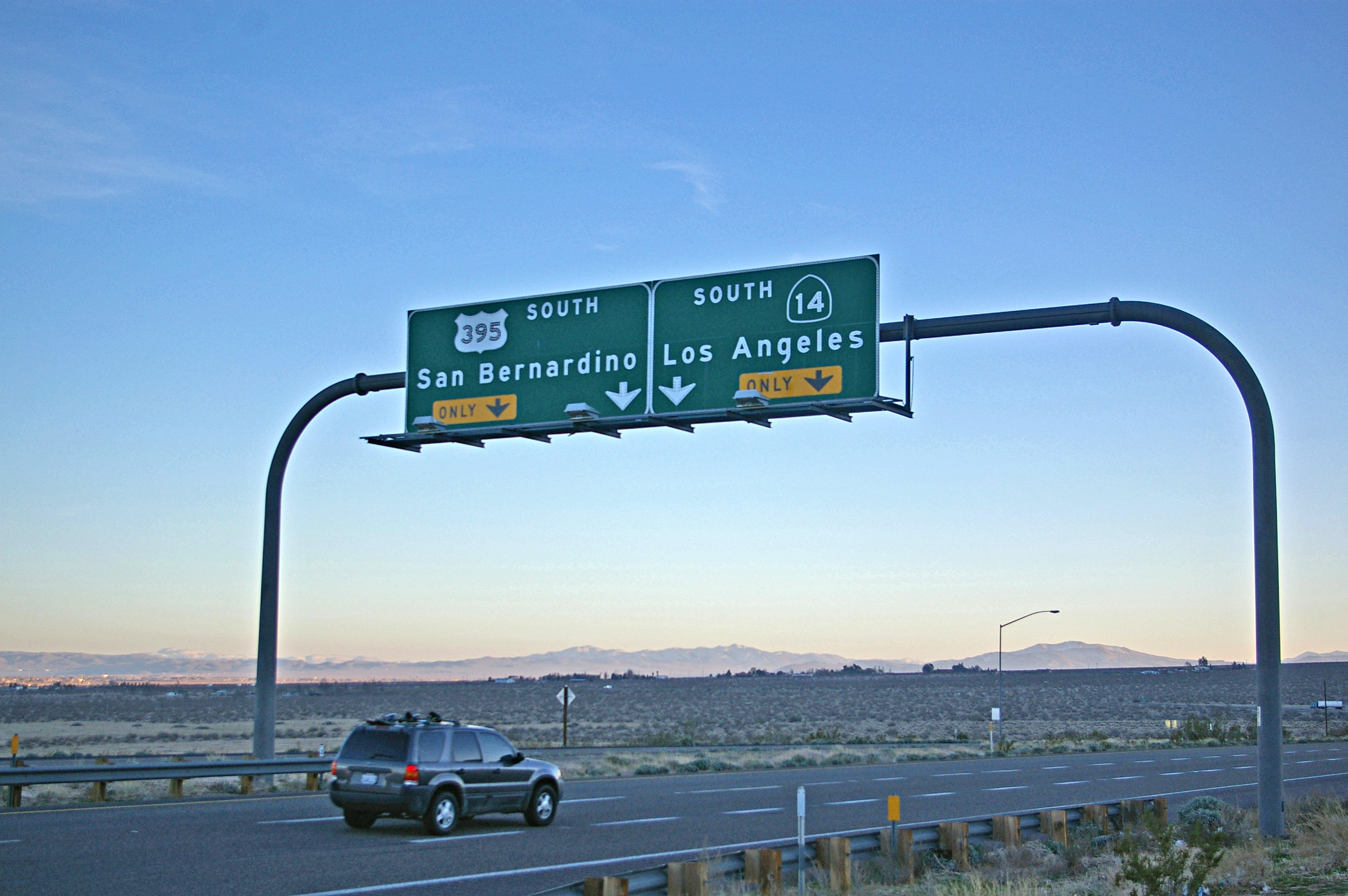
The northern terminus of SR 14 near Inyokern

SR 58 was formerly routed concurrently with SR 14 through Mojave, before it was rerouted onto a bypass running north and east of the town.

The character of the highway changes as it leaves California City with the last interchange located at California City Boulevard. Now a divided highway with at-grade intersections, departs the corridor of the rail main, to follow the crest of the forming Sierra Nevada mountains. The route continues to follow a branch line of the Union Pacific Railroad used as a connector for the Trona Railway. The main line of the railroad proceeds towards the Central Valley via Tehachapi Pass. Though SR 14 heads away from the pass, the highway has views of the mountains and the Tehachapi Pass Wind Farm. The scenery also changes, as the highway departs the Mojave Desert and crosses Red Rock Canyon State Park. Traffic counts drop dramatically as the highway becomes more rural, with an AADT of 3,200 vehicles at the northern terminus. SR 14 continues north toward US 395 in Inyokern, much of its routing as an expressway. Towards its northern terminus, SR 14 runs briefly concurrently with SR 178. At its northern terminus, SR 14 merges with US 395 as it turns into an expressway heading north to Bishop. As US 395 the route continues to follow the crest of the Sierra Nevada, serving Owens Valley, Mammoth Mountain, Yosemite National Park and Mono Lake.

== History ==
=== Trails ===
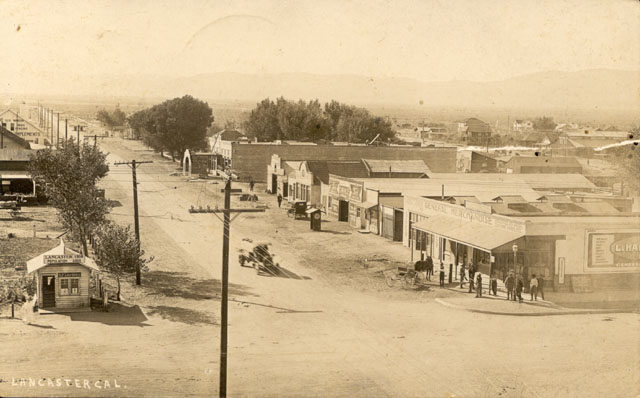
Looking south at the corner of Sierra Highway and Lancaster Boulevard in Lancaster c. 1918

The first road to use the general alignment of modern SR 14 was called the El Camino Sierra, or Sierra Highway, which extended from Los Angeles to Lake Tahoe. A dirt road was completed in the 1910s from what had been a pack trail. The Los Angeles Times declared El Camino Sierra complete in 1931, when the portion from Mojave to the Owens Valley, along modern US 395, was paved.

During the late 19th century, the corridor of modern SR 14 was also in use by the Southern Pacific Railroad. South of Mojave was used for a main line, the corridor north of Mojave follows a branch line. The main line connected Los Angeles with the Central Valley, via Soledad Pass and Tehachapi Pass. While significantly longer than the more direct Ridge Route (east of modern I-5), Tehachapi Pass is lower than Tejon Pass along the Ridge Route, with a longer, less steep grade on the descent into the Central Valley. While the Tehachapi Pass portion of this line has remained the same, over time another route was built from Mojave, across the Antelope Valley towards Cajon Pass to cross the San Gabriel Mountains, there merging with another main rail trunk to Los Angeles. The Cajon Pass fork remains the primary freight rail line to connect southern and northern California in use today, now owned and operated by the Union Pacific Railroad. The fork paralleling SR 14 and crossing at Soledad Pass is still a contiguous line, but not used for through freight traffic as a significant portion was sold to the predecessors of the Southern California Regional Rail Authority to become the Antelope Valley Line of the Metrolink commuter rail service. The branch north of Mojave was built when the Southern Pacific acquired the unfinished Carson and Colorado Railroad in 1900. The Southern Pacific built a standard gauge connector to the narrow gauge Carson and Colorado line from their main at Mojave. Although plans were to eventually convert this acquired line to standard gauge, most of the line was abandoned before the conversion was complete. The southern portion of this line is still active and connects to the Trona Railway.

The Midland Trail was one of the first organized coast-to-coast trails in the United States. In the trail's infancy, its routing changed numerous times. By 1925, the Midland Trail was established along what is modern State Route 168, joining El Camino Sierra in Big Pine. Other named trails that eventually followed this route included the Theodore Roosevelt highway, and Grand Army of the Republic Highway. Parts of modern SR 14 continue to be signed with these names, and north of Los Angeles County is still officially designated "El Camino Sierra / Midland Trail" as well as the aforementioned "Aerospace Highway".

=== U.S. Route 6 ===
US 6 was extended from Greeley, Colorado, to Long Beach, California, on June 21, 1937. Most of this extension used the Midland Trail, although the route entered California from Nevada slightly north of the previous route of the Midland Trail, instead passing through Bishop. While being designated US 6, parts of modern SR 14 were upgraded to freeway standards.

As part of the 1964 state highway renumbering, US 6 was truncated at Bishop. The portion of US 6 from Inyokern to Los Angeles was designated SR 14. Previously, the SR 14 designation was used for Artesia Boulevard and Lincoln Avenue, in the Los Angeles area, a portion of modern SR 91.

Between 1963 and 1975, significant portions of US 6/SR 14 were moved to a freeway alignment. The former routing south of Mojave (and the current routing to the north) is still known as Sierra Highway. The first freeway section, from just east of Solemint Junction to Red Rover Mine Road, was completed in 1963. Further portions in the intercanyon areas of Acton to Soledad Pass were completed by 1965. By 1966, the freeway was complete as far north as Avenue P-8 (now Technology Drive) in Palmdale. The freeway was completed to Mojave by 1972.

=== Incidents ===
The Newhall Pass interchange, where I-5, Sierra Highway, Foothill Boulevard, San Fernando Road and the southern terminus of SR 14 meet, has been the site of a number of catastrophic incidents. The interchange has partially collapsed twice due to earthquakes: the 1971 Sylmar earthquake and the 1994 Northridge earthquake. As a result of the 1994 collapse, this interchange was renamed the "Clarence Wayne Dean Memorial Interchange", honoring a Los Angeles Police Department motorcycle officer killed when he was unable to stop in time and drove off the collapsed flyover ramp from SR 14 south to I-5 south. After both earthquakes, the collapsed portions were rebuilt and surviving portions reinforced.

In 2007, two tractor-trailer trucks collided in a tunnel along the truck lanes for southbound I-5 at the interchange. A resulting fire started, soon encompassing the entire tunnel along with 30 other trucks and one passenger vehicle that were in the tunnel at the time. The truck tunnel was closed for several days for structural damage inspections and repairs.

=== Cancelled plans ===
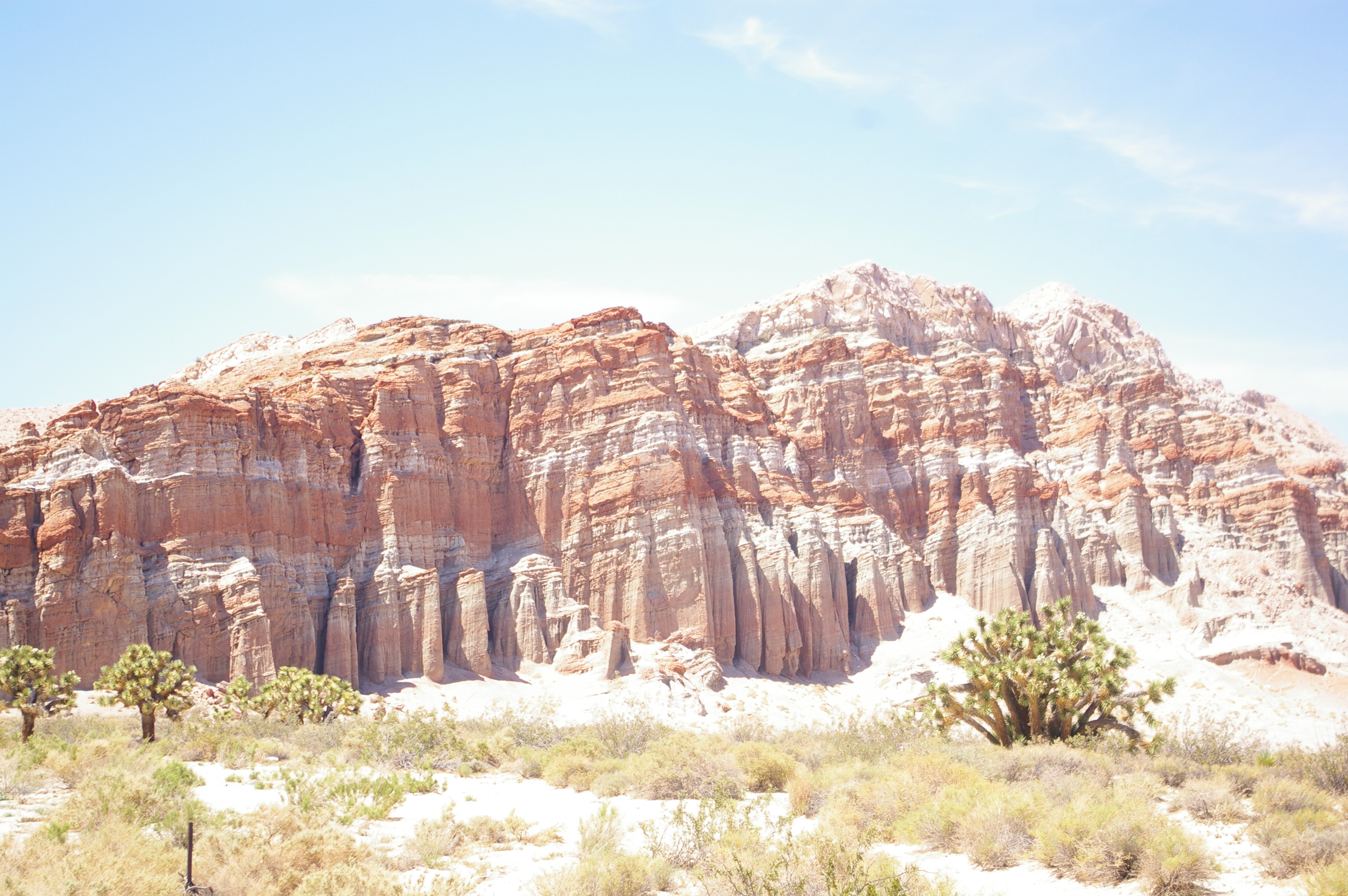
Route 14 inside Red Rock Canyon

SR 14 is an unfinished route, as the definition in the California Streets and Highways Code states that the route begins at SR 1 (Pacific Coast Highway), near Sunset Boulevard in the Pacific Palisades area of Los Angeles. Between the constructed end and legislative end of SR 14 are the community of Reseda and Topanga State Park. There is no paved road that directly connects these two points, with SR 27 or I-405 being the nearest through roads in this area.

The interchange with Sierra Highway at Via Princessa in Santa Clarita has an unusual design, with long flyover ramps for the connections. This is the result of a freeway revolt by the residents of Santa Clarita that canceled plans for a freeway extension of SR 126. While the Via Princessa alignment of SR 126 was canceled, the city of Santa Clarita constructed the Cross Valley Connector (CVC) to connect SR 126 directly to SR 14 via Newhall Ranch Road and Golden Valley Road. The final CVC section, the bridge over the Santa Clara River, was opened on March 27, 2010.

== Future ==
Rapid exurban growth in Santa Clarita, Lancaster, and Palmdale has made the Antelope Valley Freeway one of the most congested in southern California, with average rush hour speeds well below 20 miles per hour (32 km/h). Future predictions call for continued growth along the SR 14 corridor, including predictions of a tripling of the population of Palmdale by 2030. In response, multiple government agencies have proposed adding more transportation arteries between Los Angeles and the Antelope Valley, as well as expanding the capacity of the existing SR 14 and rail corridors.

Several proposals have been made to bypass the Antelope Valley Freeway by boring a tunnel under the San Gabriel Mountains and extending the Glendale Freeway through it to the Antelope Valley. In 2003, Caltrans published a map showing potential improvements to the transportation infrastructure of southern California. The proposal showed both the unconstructed portion of SR 14 and new routes over or under the mountains to Antelope Valley. In 2005, the idea was advanced as a combination toll tunnel and surface highway. Preliminary studies estimated costs around $3 billion and suggested charging a varying toll, adjusted for the time of day, averaging around $8 for one-way passage.

== Major intersections ==
Except where prefixed with a letter, postmiles were measured on the road as it was in 1964, based on the alignment that existed at the time, and do not necessarily reflect current mileage. R reflects a realignment in the route since then, M indicates a second realignment, L refers to an overlap due to a correction or change, and T indicates postmiles classified as temporary. Segments that remain unconstructed or have been relinquished to local control may be omitted. The numbers reset at county lines; the start and end postmiles in each county are given in the county column.

County	Location	Postmile	Exit	Destinations	Notes
Los Angeles; LA R24.79-R77.01	Los Angeles	R24.79	1A	I-5 south (Golden State Freeway) – Los Angeles	Newhall Pass interchange at Newhall Pass; southern end of SR 14 / Antelope Valley Freeway; I-5 exit 162
Los Angeles; LA R24.79-R77.01	Los Angeles	R24.79	1B	I-5 north (Golden State Freeway) – Sacramento	Newhall Pass interchange at Newhall Pass; southern end of SR 14 / Antelope Valley Freeway; I-5 exit 162
Los Angeles; LA R24.79-R77.01	Los Angeles	R24.79	♦	I-5 south	HOV access only; southbound exit and northbound entrance
Los Angeles; LA R24.79-R77.01	Santa Clarita		1C	I-5 Truck south / The Old Road	Southbound exit and northbound entrance; truck lanes to I-5 south; The Old Road was former US 99
Los Angeles; LA R24.79-R77.01	Santa Clarita	R27.05	2	Newhall Avenue	Former SR 126 west and was San Fernando Road
Los Angeles; LA R24.79-R77.01	Santa Clarita	R28.08	3	Placerita Canyon Road	
Los Angeles; LA R24.79-R77.01	Santa Clarita	R29.68	5	Golden Valley Road	Connects to SR 126
Los Angeles; LA R24.79-R77.01	Santa Clarita	R30.80	6A	Sierra Highway (SR 14U) – Canyon Country	Northbound exit and southbound entrance; former US 6
Los Angeles; LA R24.79-R77.01	Santa Clarita	R30.92	6B	Via Princessa	Signed as exit 6 southbound
Los Angeles; LA R24.79-R77.01	Santa Clarita	33.42	9	Sand Canyon Road	Serves Angeles National Forest & San Gabriel Mountains National Monument
Los Angeles; LA R24.79-R77.01	Santa Clarita	35.71	11	Soledad Canyon Road	Formerly signed as Shadow Pines Boulevard
Los Angeles; LA R24.79-R77.01	Agua Dulce	39.85	15	Agua Dulce Canyon Road	
Los Angeles; LA R24.79-R77.01	Agua Dulce	43.29	19	Escondido Canyon Road	
Los Angeles; LA R24.79-R77.01	Acton	46.76	22	Red Rover Mine Road, Sierra Highway	Sierra Highway was former US 6
Los Angeles; LA R24.79-R77.01	Acton	R48.61	24	Crown Valley Road – Acton	
Los Angeles; LA R24.79-R77.01	Acton	R50.75	26	Santiago Road	
Los Angeles; LA R24.79-R77.01	Acton	R52.17	27	Soledad Canyon Road	
Los Angeles; LA R24.79-R77.01	Soledad Pass	R54.54	30	Angeles Forest Highway (CR N3), Pearblossom Highway	
Los Angeles; LA R24.79-R77.01	Palmdale	R58.17	33	Avenue S	
Los Angeles; LA R24.79-R77.01	Palmdale	R59.80	35	SR 138 east / CR N2 west (Palmdale Boulevard) – Palmdale	Southern end of SR 138 concurrency; northern end of SR 14 HOV lanes
Los Angeles; LA R24.79-R77.01	Palmdale	R61.37	37	Rancho Vista Boulevard	Northbound exit and southbound entrance; formerly signed as Avenue P; serves LA/Palmdale Regional Airport
Los Angeles; LA R24.79-R77.01	Palmdale	R61.77	37	10th Street West	Southbound exit and northbound entrance; serves LA/Palmdale Regional Airport
Los Angeles; LA R24.79-R77.01	Palmdale	R63.67	39	Avenue N	Also known as R. Lee Ermey Avenue
Los Angeles; LA R24.79-R77.01	Palmdale–Lancaster line	R64.68	40	Avenue M	Also known as Columbia Way
Los Angeles; LA R24.79-R77.01	Lancaster	R65.68	41	Avenue L	
Los Angeles; LA R24.79-R77.01	Lancaster	R66.73	42	Avenue K	
Los Angeles; LA R24.79-R77.01	Lancaster	R67.39	43	20th Street West	Northbound exit only
Los Angeles; LA R24.79-R77.01	Lancaster	R67.96	43	Avenue J (CR N5)	No northbound exit
Los Angeles; LA R24.79-R77.01	Lancaster	R68.97	44	Avenue I	
Los Angeles; LA R24.79-R77.01	Lancaster	R69.99	45	Avenue H	
Los Angeles; LA R24.79-R77.01	Lancaster	R70.99	46	Avenue G	
Los Angeles; LA R24.79-R77.01		R72.00	47	Avenue F	
Los Angeles; LA R24.79-R77.01		R74.00	49	SR 138 west (Avenue D) – Gorman	Northern end of SR 138 concurrency
Los Angeles–Kern county line		R77.01 R0.17	52	Avenue A	
Kern; KER R0.00-64.56	Rosamond	R3.02	55	Rosamond Boulevard – Rosamond, Edwards AFB	
Kern; KER R0.00-64.56	Rosamond	R6.12	58	Dawn Road	
Kern; KER R0.00-64.56	Mojave	R9.15	61	Backus Road	
Kern; KER R0.00-64.56	Mojave	R12.15	64	Silver Queen Road	Connects to Sierra Highway
Kern; KER R0.00-64.56	Mojave		Northern end of Antelope Valley Freeway		
Kern; KER R0.00-64.56	Mojave	16.06		SR 58 Bus. east to SR 58 east – Barstow	Southern end of SR 58 Bus. concurrency; former US 466 east / SR 58 east
Kern; KER R0.00-64.56	Mojave	L17.38 16.07		SR 58 Bus. west to SR 58 west – Bakersfield	Northern end of SR 58 Bus. concurrency; former US 466 west / SR 58 west
Kern; KER R0.00-64.56		19.24		SR 58 – Bakersfield, Barstow	Interchange; SR 58 exit 167
Kern; KER R0.00-64.56	California City	21.29	73	California City Boulevard	Interchange
Kern; KER R0.00-64.56	Freeman Junction	57.77		SR 178 west – Weldon, Lake Isabella	Southern end of SR 178 concurrency
Kern; KER R0.00-64.56	Inyokern	60.57		SR 178 east to US 395 south – Inyokern, Ridgecrest	Northern end of SR 178 concurrency
Kern; KER R0.00-64.56	Inyokern	64.56		US 395 north – Bishop, Reno	Interchange; northern end of SR 14; no access to US 395 south; former US 6 north
1.000 mi = 1.609 km; 1.000 km = 0.621 mi: Concurrency terminus; HOV only; Incomplete access
