= Soledad Pass =

Mountain pass in California, US

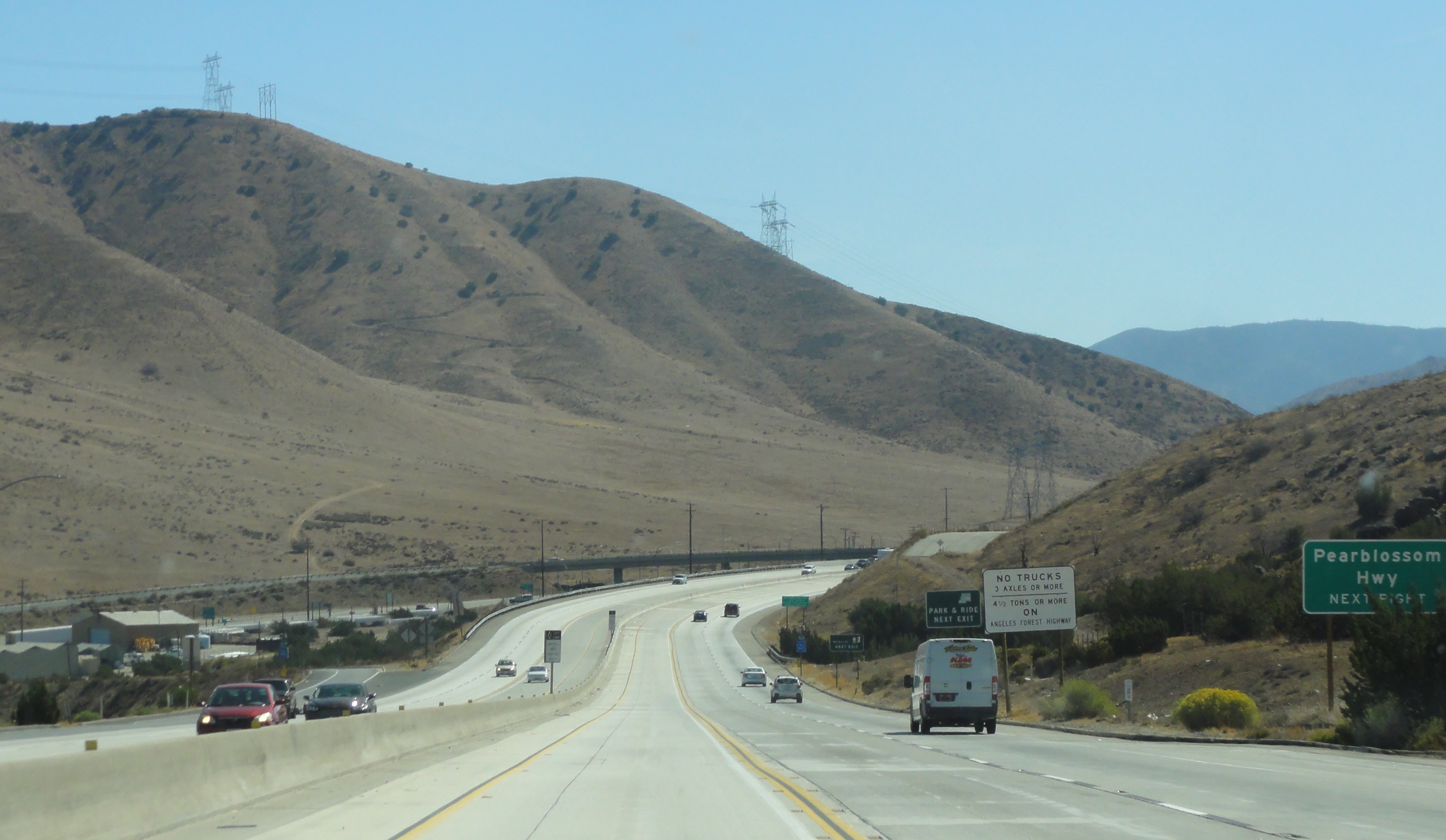
- Southbound view from CA 14.

- Location within the Los Angeles metropolitan area Location within California
- Elevation: 3,209 feet (978 m)
- Traversed by: SR 14 (Antelope Valley Freeway); CR N3; Metrolink: CHSR (future); Union Pacific Railroad

Third Approach
- Location: Los Angeles County, California, U.S.
- Range: Sierra Pelona Mountains/ San Gabriel Mountains
- Coordinates: 34°30′24″N 118°06′44″W
- Topo map: USGS Palmdale

Soledad Pass, elevation 3,209 ft (978 m), is a mountain pass in northern Los Angeles County, California.

It is located at the highest point along Soledad Canyon, which winds between the Sierra Pelona Mountains to the northwest and the San Gabriel Mountains to the southeast. The pass provides a direct route between the Santa Clara River watershed and the Antelope Valley of the western Mojave Desert.

The pass is also notable as the lowest crossing of the Great Basin Divide between the Sierra Nevada and the San Bernardino Mountains.

== Transportation route ==
Soledad Pass is traversed by one railroad line owned by Union Pacific Railroad and three highways: the Antelope Valley Freeway (SR 14), Sierra Highway (SR 14U), and Angeles Forest Highway (CR N3).

The railroad route is a former mainline of the Southern Pacific Railroad, now part of Union Pacific Railroad. The importance of the railroad line for freight traffic diminished following the completion of Palmdale Cutoff over Cajon Pass in the 1960s. Today, most Union Pacific intermodal trains continue to utilize the pass, although formerly soda ash and rock trains also used it as well until they were discontinued. The route is also utilized by Metrolink's Antelope Valley Line and is part of a proposed alignment of the California High-Speed Rail system over the pass.

Metrolink's Vincent Grade/Acton station is located just south of the pass.

== See also ==
- List of mountain passes in California
- Escondido Summit
