= Escondido Summit =

Mountain pass in Los Angeles County, California, United States

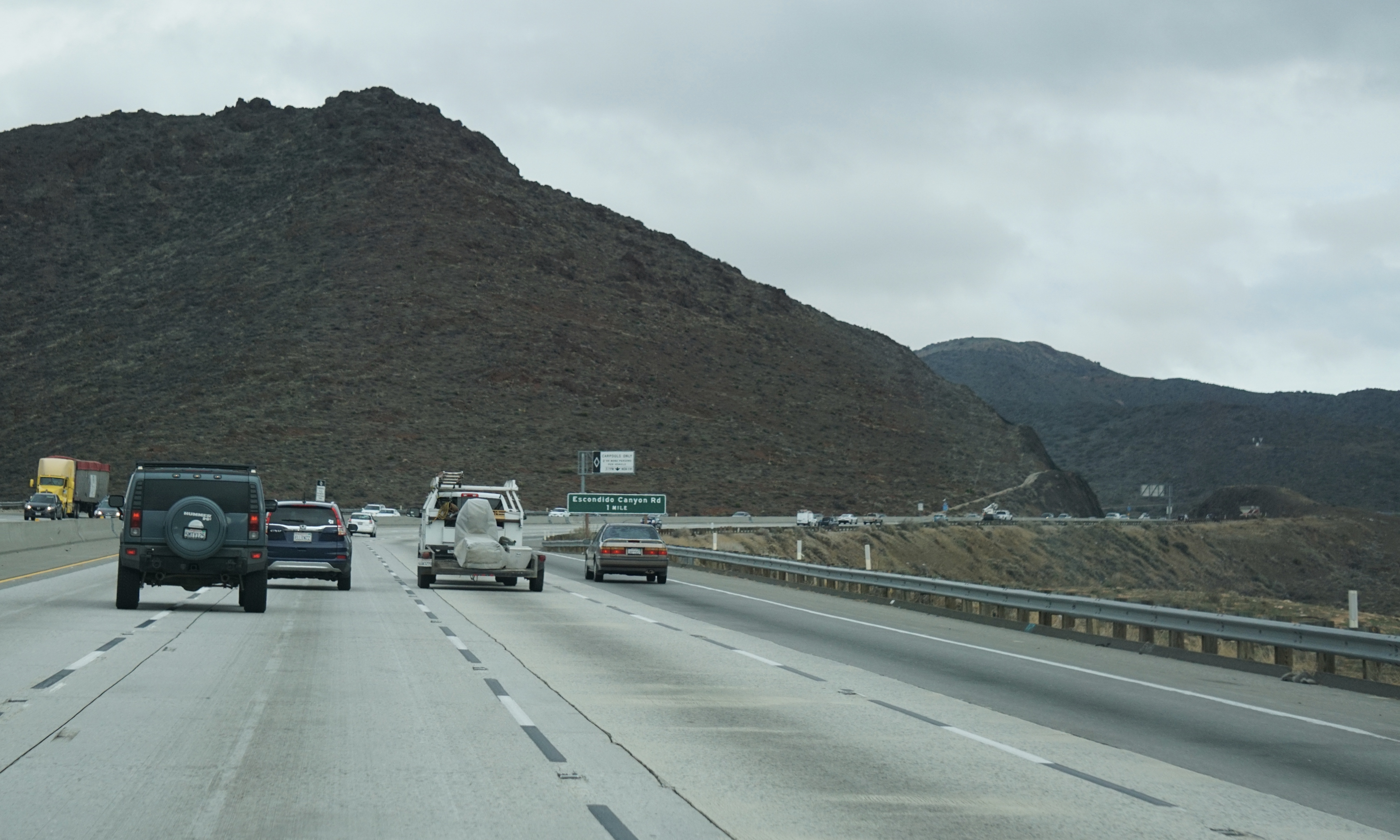
- Northbound view from CA 14.

- Location within the Los Angeles metropolitan area Location within California
- Elevation: 3,258 feet (993 m)
- Traversed by: SR 14, US 6 (until 1964)

Third Approach
- Location: Los Angeles County, California, U.S.
- Range: Sierra Pelona Mountains
- Coordinates: 34°30′09″N 118°15′18″W
- Topo map: USGS Palmdale

Escondido Summit, elevation 3,258 ft (993 m), is a mountain pass in northern Los Angeles County, California.

It is located at the highest point along California Highway 14, which crests in the foothills of the Sierra Pelona Mountains just 3 mi (4.8 km) northwest of Acton, California.

== Nearby Formations ==
- Soledad Pass - a second, lower mountain pass located at the highest point within Soledad Canyon.
- Soledad Canyon
- Vazquez Rocks
