= Acton, California =

Census-designated place in California, United States

- Unincorporated community Census designated place
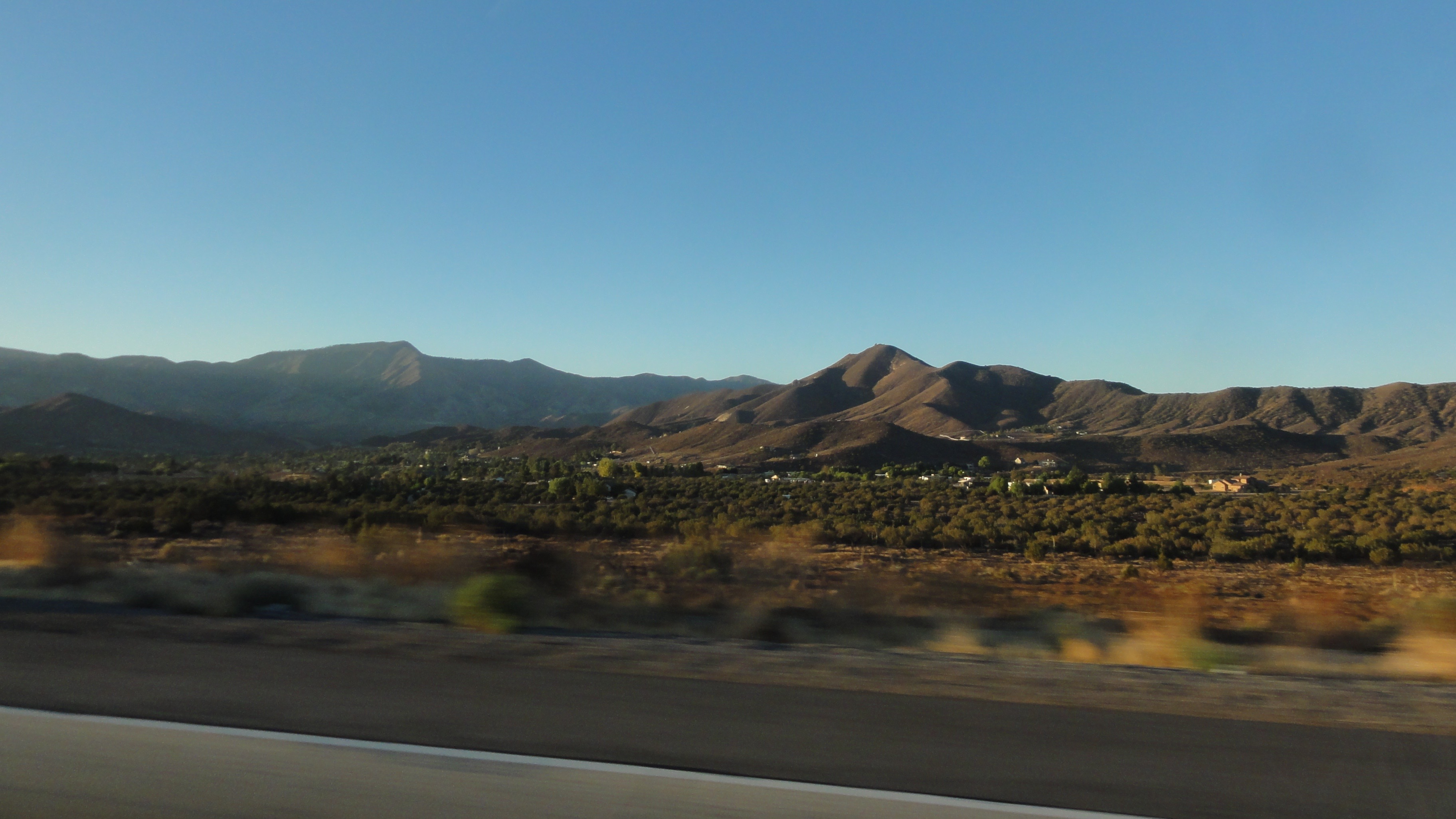
- View of Acton and the surrounding valley from Route 14, with Mt. Gleason and the San Gabriel Mountains in the background

- Location of Acton in Los Angeles County, California

- Location of Acton in Los Angeles County, California Location of Acton in California Location of Acton in the USA
- Coordinates: 34.48°N 118.19°W
- Country: United States
- State: California
- County: Los Angeles
- Named for: Acton, Massachusetts

Area
  - Total: 39.28 sq mi (101.74 km^{2})
  - Land: 39.26 sq mi (101.68 km^{2})
  - Water: 0.023 sq mi (0.06 km^{2}) 0.06%
- Elevation: 2,710 ft (826 m)

Population (2020)
  - Total: 7,431
  - Density: 189.3/sq mi (73.08/km^{2})
- Time zone: UTC−8 (Pacific)
  - Summer (DST): UTC−7 (PDT)
- ZIP Code: 93510
- Area code: 661
- FIPS code: 06-00212
- GNIS feature IDs: 1660228, 2407697

Acton is an unincorporated community and census-designated place (CDP) in Los Angeles County, California, United States. According to the 2020 census, Acton had a population of 7,431.

Acton is a small residential community located between the Sierra Pelona Mountains and the San Gabriel Mountains, near the Antelope Valley. It is off the Antelope Valley Freeway (California State Route 14) south of Palmdale. Acton is roughly 20 miles (32 km) northeast of the San Fernando Valley, and 47 miles (76 km) north of downtown Los Angeles by highway. The town has a rural western theme which can be seen in its homes, commercial buildings and historical buildings, some of which date back to the late 1800s. The homes in the mountains around Acton have views of the valley below. In the valley are ranch style homes, often with equestrian facilities. Acton is grouped together with the Antelope Valley in the Los Angeles County General Plan. Acton has a Metrolink commuter rail station at Vincent Grade that is themed in an "old western" style and has been seen in various movies and commercials.

== History ==
The town originally had served as a railroad camp from 1873 to 1876 when the Saugus-Mojave section of the Southern Pacific Railroad was under construction.

Acton was once considered for the State capital of California. California Governor Henry T. Gage (1899–1903) owned the Governor Mine, hence the name, and sought to relocate the capital to Acton. This effort ultimately failed and the capital was not moved from Sacramento. In the late 1880s, Acton started to become more of a ranching and farming community. In 1889 Acton's first hotel and its first saloon, the "49er" (formerly Sutter's Mill), was opened and is still in business today.

== Geography ==
Acton is located at 34°28′22″N 118°11′1″W (34.472777, -118.183696), 20 miles (32 km) east of Santa Clarita and 8 miles (13 km) south of Palmdale. According to the United States Census Bureau, the CDP has a total area of 39.3 square miles (102 km^{2}), over 99% of it land. Mount Gleason, one of the peaks of the San Gabriel Mountains, is located 7 miles (11 km) south of Acton and can be seen in the town or by passersby on the 14.

=== Climate ===
This region experiences warm (but not very hot) and dry summers, with no average monthly temperatures above 71.6 °F (22.0 °C). According to the Köppen Climate Classification system, Acton has a warm-summer Mediterranean climate, abbreviated Csb on climate maps. Summer daytime temperatures average 88 °F (31 °C) and above.

== Demographics ==
Historical population
Census	Pop.	Note	%±
1990	1,471		—
2000	2,390		62.5%
2010	7,596		217.8%
2020	7,431		−2.2%
U.S. Decennial Census; 1860–1870 1880-1890; 1900 1910 1920; 1930 1940 1950; 1960 1970 1980; 1990 2000 2010; 2020

Acton first appeared as a census designated place in the 1990 U.S. census.

=== Racial and ethnic composition ===
Acton CDP, California – Racial and ethnic composition Note: the US Census treats Hispanic/Latino as an ethnic category. This table excludes Latinos from the racial categories and assigns them to a separate category. Hispanics/Latinos may be of any race.
Race / Ethnicity (NH = Non-Hispanic)	Pop 1990	Pop 2000	Pop 2010	Pop 2020	% 1990	% 2000	% 2010	% 2020
White alone (NH)	1,275	2,015	5,782	4,736	86.78%	84.31%	76.12%	63.73%
Black or African American alone (NH)	20	14	54	72	1.36%	0.59%	0.71%	0.97%
Native American or Alaska Native alone (NH)	15	6	38	33	1.02%	0.25%	0.50%	0.44%
Asian alone (NH)	11	35	151	153	0.75%	1.46%	1.99%	2.06%
Native Hawaiian or Pacific Islander alone (NH)	11	1	2	11	0.75%	0.04%	0.03%	0.15%
Other race alone (NH)	-	11	16	67	-	0.46%	0.21%	0.90%
Mixed race or Multiracial (NH)	x	45	180	283	x	1.88%	2.37%	3.81%
Hispanic or Latino (any race)	150	263	1,373	2,076	10.20%	11.00%	18.08%	27.94%
Total	1,471	2,390	7,596	7,431	100.00%	100.00%	100.00%	100.00%

=== 2020 census ===
As of the 2020 census, Acton had a population of 7,431 and a population density of 189.3 inhabitants per square mile (73.1/km^{2}). The age distribution was 17.5% under the age of 18, 7.8% from 18 to 24, 20.8% from 25 to 44, 35.3% from 45 to 64, and 18.6% who were 65 years of age or older. The median age was 48.2 years. For every 100 females there were 103.4 males, and for every 100 females age 18 and over there were 102.7 males age 18 and over. 0.0% of residents lived in urban areas and 100.0% lived in rural areas.

The racial makeup of Acton was 68.9% White, 1.1% Black or African American, 1.0% American Indian and Alaska Native, 2.1% Asian, 0.2% Native Hawaiian and Other Pacific Islander, 12.9% from other races, and 13.8% from two or more races. Hispanic or Latino residents of any race were 27.9% of the population.

The whole population lived in households. There were 2,682 households, of which 24.2% had children under the age of 18 living in them. Of all households, 58.4% were married-couple households, 6.3% were cohabiting couple households, 16.9% were households with a male householder and no spouse or partner present, and 18.4% were households with a female householder and no spouse or partner present. About 19.3% of all households were made up of individuals and 9.2% had someone living alone who was 65 years of age or older. The average household size was 2.77. There were 1,998 families (74.5% of all households).

There were 2,821 housing units at an average density of 71.9 units per square mile (27.8 units/km^{2}), of which 2,682 (95.1%) were occupied and 4.9% were vacant. Of occupied units, 88.0% were owner-occupied and 12.0% were occupied by renters. The homeowner vacancy rate was 1.3% and the rental vacancy rate was 5.7%.

=== Mapping L.A. ===
According to Mapping L.A., German and Irish were the most common ancestries in 2000. Mexico and Canada were the most common foreign places of birth.

== Economy ==
Median earnings per worker in Acton in 2015 were $75,714 compared to the United States average of $44,178. Acton has $84,375 median earnings for men, 55% greater than the $54,384 median for women. 22% of the people in Acton report self-employment income, twice the U.S. average of 11%.

6.9% of the population of Acton lives in poverty. Of those, 17% are employed. Just 1% of Acton households use some form of public assistance, compared to the United States average of 14%.

7% of Acton workers carpool to work, less than the U.S. average of 10%. Acton has a large number of people who are able to work from home at 12% versus 4% for the U.S. The average commute to work in Acton is 46 minutes, much longer than the U.S. average of 26 minutes.

== Parks and recreation ==
=== Farm Sanctuary ===
Farm Sanctuary, founded here in 1986, was America's first shelter for farmed animals.

=== Shambala Preserve ===
The Shambala Preserve, a wild animal nature park run by actress Tippi Hedren, is located near Acton. Ventures on Hedren's 80-acre (320,000 m^{2}) wild animal compound include a Safari at the authentic African-style haven for more than 70 African lions, Royal Bengal and Siberian tigers, spotted and black leopards, cougars, and African elephants.

=== Parker Mountain ===
Acton is home to Parker Mountain, the mecca for a style of radio-controlled aircraft flying called dynamic soaring and where at one time the world speed record of 302 mph (486 km/h) was achieved.

=== Bloom Ranch ===
Established in 1891 by Swiss immigrants George Blum and Magdalena Greutman and originally called Blum Ranch, Bloom Ranch is one of Acton's oldest homesteads. The ranch has a rich history of agricultural production, including pears, apples, lilacs, and renowned peaches. A notable feature is the stone house constructed in 1916, symbolizing the family's enduring commitment to the land. In 2023, Dr. Bill Releford acquired Bloom Ranch and expanded the property to 250 acres, making it the largest Black-owned ranch in Los Angeles County. Under his leadership, the ranch emphasizes sustainable farming practices and community engagement, hosting events like the annual "Bloom's Giving Fall Festival" to foster local connections. The fresh sustainable food produce of Bloom Ranch inspired Releford's book "The Real Farm-acy: 5 Colors a Day to Better Health".

== Government ==
In the California State Legislature, Acton is in the 23rd senatorial district, represented by Republican Suzette Martinez Valladares, and in the 34th Assembly district, represented by Republican Tom Lackey.

In the United States House of Representatives, Acton is in California's 27th congressional district, represented by Democrat George T. Whitesides.

Acton is part of the unincorporated portion of Los Angeles County and is in the 5th Supervisorial District. At the local level, the community is represented by the Acton Town Council, an advisory group of citizens made up of 7 members.

== Education ==
Acton is served by the Acton-Agua Dulce Unified School District. There are three schools in Acton: Meadowlark Elementary School, High Desert Middle School, and Vasquez High School.

== Infrastructure ==
The Los Angeles County Department of Health Services operates the Antelope Valley Health Center in Lancaster, serving Acton.
