= George Henry Carson =

American politician (1832–1901)

George Cady Carson (1832–1901) was a merchant, road builder, rancher and member of the Los Angeles, California, Common Council in the 1850s.

== Personal ==
Carson was born in New York in 1832, and when he was thirteen he was brought to Saint Charles, Illinois.

On July 30, 1857, he married Maria Victoria Dominguez (April 27, 1842 – December 18, 1916), the daughter of Manuel Dominguez and Maria Engracia Cota. Their sons were John Manuel, George Henry Jr., Edward Albert, Christobal José, William Christobal, Joseph Noel and David Victor and they had eight daughters — Anna Francisca, Maria Engracia, Amelia Magdalena, Victoria Lenora, Virginia Adelaida, Maria Victoria (died same day as born), Ellen Victoria (died 1 day after birth) and Lucy Susana. He had a brother, Henry.

He died November 20, 1901. In religion, Carson was a Catholic.

== Career ==
=== Military ===
Carson enlisted at the age of fourteen as a "soldier, drummer and bugler" to serve in the Mexican War in a regiment of Illinois volunteers. and was mustered out in Santa Fe.

=== Commercial and ranching ===
After he left the Army, Carson became a trader in Santa Fe, New Mexico Territory, and south into Mexico.

He moved to Los Angeles, California in 1853.

In 1854, the Los Angeles County Board of Supervisors gave Carson and William T.B. Sanford a contract to build a new wagon road alignment of the Stockton – Los Angeles Road through the San Fernando Pass section of the Stockton – Los Angeles Road in the northern San Fernando Valley. They also lowered the pass with a road−cut 50 feet (15 m) deep for a less steep hill climb/descent by wagons. In 1858, the first Butterfield Overland Mail stage used the pass. In 1862, a narrow and deeper road−cut lowered the road by 50 feet, known as the Newhall Cut—Beale's Cut.

Carson owned a hardware store and livery stable business on Commercial Street in Los Angeles, in partnership with William T.B. Sanford. He sold his share in 1862 to take on the management of the Rancho San Pedro, and then Dominguez Rancho section of it, in southwestern Los Angeles County. Carson began "stock raising and ranching on a large scale." One project was in partnership with prominent Southern California banker and investor Isaias W. Hellman.

=== Public service ===
Carson was Los Angeles County public administrator for twelve years, beginning in 1855. In a special election on December 27, 1856, he became a member of the Los Angeles Common Council, the governing body of the city. He served until January 19, 1858.

== Legacy ==
The city of Carson, California, was named in honor of George Carson. His descendants formed the Carson Estate Company, which later became the Carson Companies.

== Notes ==
- California State University, Dominguez Hills: The papers of George Henry Carson
