= William Sanford =

William Sanford may refer to:

- William Eli Sanford (1838–1899), Canadian businessman, philanthropist, and politician
- William Ayshford Sanford (1818–1902), Australian landowner, naturalist and politician
- William Taylor Barnes Sanford (1814–1863), American road builder and member of the Los Angeles council

== See also ==
- William Sandford (1841–1932), English-Australian ironmaster
- William Sandford (colonist) (1637–1691), colonist, planter, government official and militiaman.
