= Three point =

Three point may refer to:

- Three Points, Arizona
- Three Points, California
- Three-point lighting, a photographer's method of illuminating a scene
- Three-point field goal, a field goal in a basketball game
- Three-point play, a basketball term
- Three-point hitch, a method of attaching implements to an agricultural tractor
