= William Taylor Barnes Sanford =

American businessman (1814–1863)

William Taylor Barnes Sanford (1814–1863) was an American road builder, a landowner and the second postmaster of Los Angeles, California, after it became a part of the United States. He was a member of the Los Angeles Common Council from 1853 to 1854.

== Personal ==
=== Family ===
Sanford was born in Kentucky in 1814 to John Dozier Sanford and Hannah Barnes. His siblings were John Sanford, murdered in 1863 by bandit Charles Wilkins (who was later lynched), and Rebecca Sanford, who married California pioneer Phineas Banning.

Between 1850 and 1855, Wilson was the owner of the oldest frame building in Los Angeles — a home that was built for Benjamin Davis Wilson on the East Coast, taken apart, shipped around Cape Horn and reassembled "on the southern corner of Macy and Alameda streets." The house was later given to the Sisters of Charity and was torn down in 1896.

=== Death ===
Sanford died in the 1863 explosion of the steamer Ada Hancock in San Pedro harbor. His wife (a daughter of Benjamin Davis Wilson) was injured.

== Occupations ==
=== Public service ===
Sanford was the second postmaster of Los Angeles after it became a part of the United States.

He was a member of the Los Angeles Common Council in 1853–54. It was he who successfully suggested to the council that "the two printers" in the city be invited to send a reporter each to their council meetings "for the purpose of bringing any matter of general interest to the public through their newspapers."

Sanford was elected to the Los Angeles school board in 1854 — along with Manuel Requena and Francis Mellus — as part of an energetic drive to erect the first public school in the city, which at that time had "fully five hundred children of school age." In 1854–55 a two-story brick schoolhouse, known as School No. 1, was built at a cost of $6,000 on the northwest corner of Spring and Second streets.

=== Accountancy ===
At one point, he was an accountant for Wells Fargo & Co.

=== Road builder ===
As a road builder, in 1850 Sanford cut a new wagon trail over the Cajon Pass in San Bernardino County, which was preferable to "the rocky stream bed of the East Cajon. The down slope at the top of the new route was still very steep, and they had to lower wagons down the descent. For a distance of 50 feet or so the cattle and all slid down." Known as the Sanford Crossing, Sanford Cutoff or Sanford Pass Route, the road over Baldy Mesa Ridge and West Cajon Fork was used "until completion of the John Brown toll road in 1861.

West of today's Interstate I-15 is the wagon road originally known as the San Bernardino to Salt Lake Road of 1855–1856 (the Sanford Pass Route). This alternate route led from the Mormon Rocks area up and over Cajon Pass to rejoin the main road near Victorville. It was considered the easiest wagon route down into the San Bernardino Valley.

Along this alignment, Sanford took part in a venture with Phineas Banning and David W. Alexander that opened up a trade route between Los Angeles and Salt Lake City along the Old Spanish Trail to Parowan and onward along the Mormon route to Salt Lake City. The first shipment, in 1855, was a "heavily-laden freighted train of fifteen wagons drawn by one hundred and fifty mules."

The Los Angeles County Board of Supervisors in 1854 gave Sanford and George Carson a contract to build a new wagon road through the Tejon Pass, which road was improved later, in 1858 and 1863, eventually to include a narrow passageway known as the Newhall Cut or Beale's Cut.

=== Land ownership ===
In 1854, Sanford, along with Phineas Banning, John G. Downey and Benjamin D. Wilson, purchased acreage from Rancho San Pedro that became the town of Wilmington four years later.

With Wilson W. Jones, Sanford was part owner of Rancho San Jose de Buenos Ayres, which encompassed what today is the Westside area of Los Angeles County; in 1858 Benjamin D. Wilson bought out Sanford's interest.
