= Burnt Peak (California) =

Mountain peak in Los Angeles County, California, United States

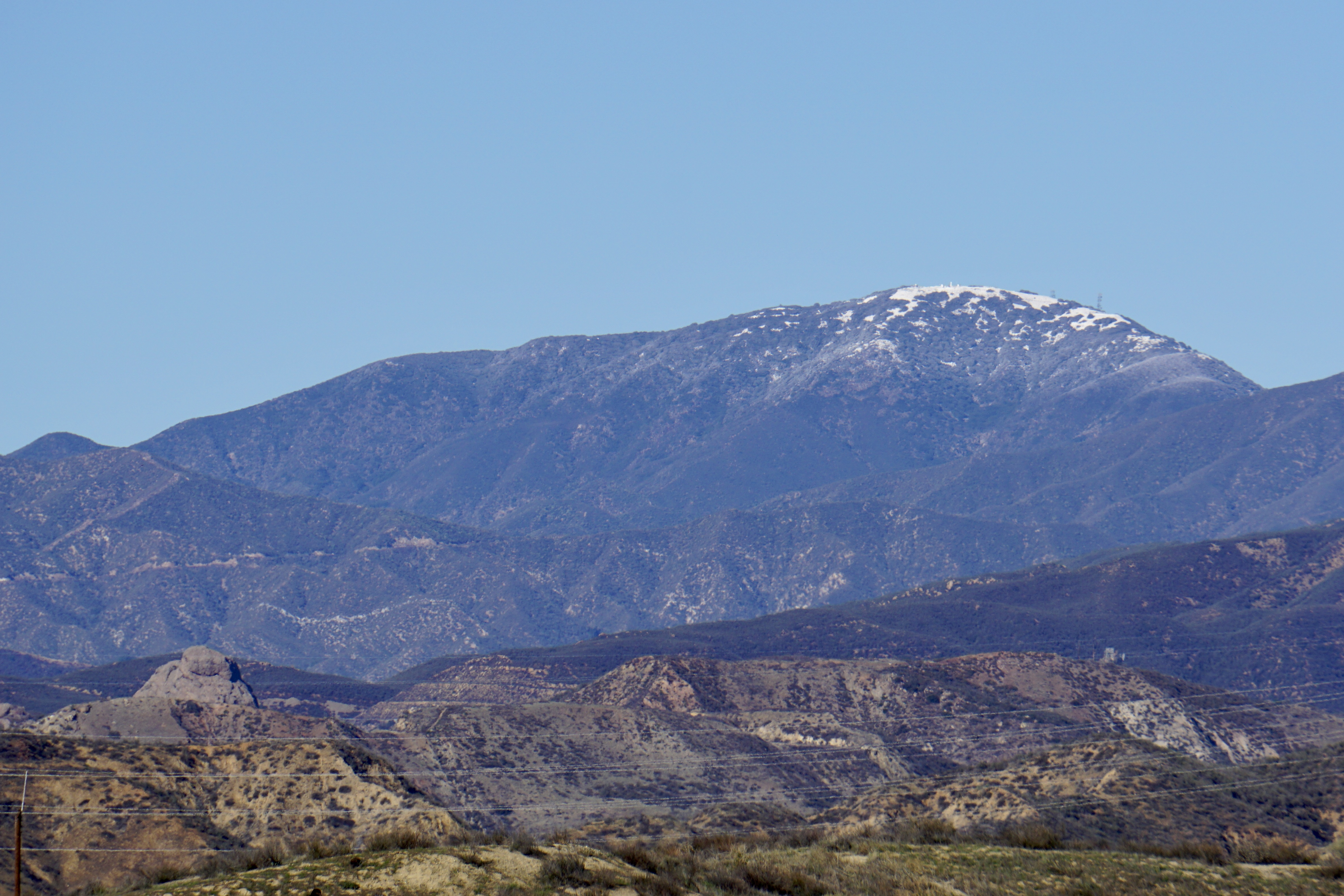
- South face of Burnt Peak.

Highest point
- Elevation: 5,791 ft (1,765 m) NAVD 88
- Prominence: 2,448 ft (746 m)
- Listing: Hundred Peaks Section
- Coordinates: 34°40′57″N 118°34′36″W

Geography
- Location within California Location within the United States
- Location: Los Angeles County, California, U.S.
- Parent range: Sierra Pelona Ridge

Climbing
- Easiest route: Hike, class 1

Burnt Peak is the highest peak of the Sierra Pelona, located in northwestern Los Angeles County, Southern California. The peak is home to a VOR air navigation beacon.

== Geography ==
The mountain, 5,791 feet (1,765 m) in elevation, is protected within the Angeles National Forest. It is north of Santa Clarita, west of Lake Hughes, and east of the Ridge Route. Just a few miles north lies the unincorporated town of Three Points.

The Sierra Pelona Mountains are part of the Transverse Ranges System.

== See also ==
- Category:Sierra Pelona Ridge – related topics
- Sandberg, California
