= Sandberg, California =

Unincorporated community in California, United States

Coordinates: 34.741093°N 118.709534°W

Sandberg is the name of a post office and small surrounding community that was attached to The Sandberg Lodge (originally Sandberg's Summit Hotel), located on the Ridge Route highway in the Sierra Pelona Mountains of Southern California, United States. The Ridge Route linked the Greater Los Angeles area to the San Joaquin Valley and Central California from 1915 through 1933.

The lodge was destroyed by a fire in 1961, but the site lives on as a dot on northwestern Los Angeles County maps. Sandberg was later the site of a U.S. weather station.

== Geography ==
Sandberg is 9.7 miles (16 km) southwest of the small town of Neenach in the Antelope Valley. It is 69 miles (110 km) via Interstate 5 to Downtown Los Angeles. Sandberg is classed as a populated place by the United States Geological Survey, which means it is "a place or area with clustered or scattered buildings and a permanent human population." Its mean elevation above sea level is 4,163 feet (1,269 m).

It is 19 miles (31 km) northwest of the summit of Burnt Peak.

=== Climate ===
Climate data for Sandberg, California, 1991–2020 normals, extremes 1934–present
Month	Jan	Feb	Mar	Apr	May	Jun	Jul	Aug	Sep	Oct	Nov	Dec	Year
Record high °F (°C)	82 (28)	78 (26)	83 (28)	86 (30)	98 (37)	107 (42)	106 (41)	104 (40)	105 (41)	95 (35)	83 (28)	75 (24)	107 (42)
Mean maximum °F (°C)	64.7 (18.2)	65.6 (18.7)	72.6 (22.6)	79.0 (26.1)	85.6 (29.8)	92.7 (33.7)	98.0 (36.7)	97.0 (36.1)	93.5 (34.2)	84.9 (29.4)	73.8 (23.2)	66.5 (19.2)	99.6 (37.6)
Mean daily maximum °F (°C)	52.3 (11.3)	53.0 (11.7)	57.3 (14.1)	62.0 (16.7)	70.2 (21.2)	79.9 (26.6)	87.7 (30.9)	88.3 (31.3)	82.7 (28.2)	71.3 (21.8)	59.9 (15.5)	51.6 (10.9)	68.0 (20.0)
Daily mean °F (°C)	45.4 (7.4)	45.7 (7.6)	48.9 (9.4)	52.3 (11.3)	59.7 (15.4)	68.7 (20.4)	76.3 (24.6)	76.8 (24.9)	72.0 (22.2)	61.9 (16.6)	51.9 (11.1)	44.6 (7.0)	58.7 (14.8)
Mean daily minimum °F (°C)	38.6 (3.7)	38.3 (3.5)	40.6 (4.8)	42.7 (5.9)	49.2 (9.6)	57.5 (14.2)	64.8 (18.2)	65.3 (18.5)	61.2 (16.2)	52.5 (11.4)	44.0 (6.7)	37.6 (3.1)	49.4 (9.7)
Mean minimum °F (°C)	26.5 (−3.1)	27.1 (−2.7)	28.8 (−1.8)	30.6 (−0.8)	36.3 (2.4)	42.1 (5.6)	54.1 (12.3)	53.5 (11.9)	45.9 (7.7)	37.7 (3.2)	30.7 (−0.7)	25.9 (−3.4)	22.8 (−5.1)
Record low °F (°C)	3 (−16)	13 (−11)	14 (−10)	22 (−6)	26 (−3)	30 (−1)	40 (4)	40 (4)	35 (2)	21 (−6)	21 (−6)	11 (−12)	3 (−16)
Average precipitation inches (mm)	2.50 (64)	3.72 (94)	1.96 (50)	0.76 (19)	0.41 (10)	0.08 (2.0)	0.09 (2.3)	0.06 (1.5)	0.13 (3.3)	0.60 (15)	0.78 (20)	2.05 (52)	13.14 (333.1)
Average snowfall inches (cm)	4.0 (10)	2.2 (5.6)	2.2 (5.6)	1.6 (4.1)	0.0 (0.0)	0.0 (0.0)	0.0 (0.0)	0.0 (0.0)	0.0 (0.0)	0.0 (0.0)	0.0 (0.0)	3.2 (8.1)	13.2 (33.4)
Average precipitation days (≥ 0.01 in)	6.8	8.3	6.7	4.5	2.9	0.7	0.7	0.6	1.2	2.4	3.8	6.8	45.4
Source 1: NOAA
Source 2: National Weather Service

== History ==
=== The Sandbergs ===
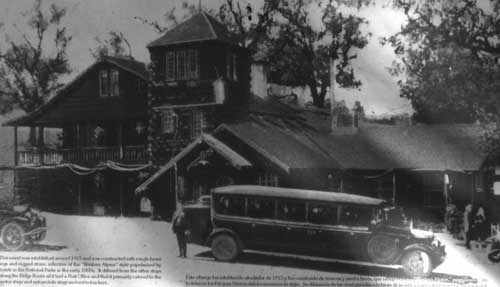
The Sandberg Lodge in the 1920s, from an image on the historic marker at the site.

Sandberg's was the high-class place. This is where you would see the Cadillacs, Packards and Studebakers parked. It was said they had a sign, 'Truck Drivers and Dogs Not Allowed'.

Harald Sandberg, a native of Norway, settled in the Antelope Valley with his brother, Albert, in 1882, and they developed large areas there. On April 2, 1897, Harald filed homestead papers on ranch property just north of the parcel that later housed his hotel and inn.

In December 1900 the brothers made news when they " captured a very large specimen of the California condor on their mountain ranch at Neenach, near Newhall, last Saturday."

" The bird had gorged itself on a dead cow until unable to fly, and will now have to pay for being a blutton [sic] by a term of captivity. . . . The specimen captured measures about twelve feet from tip to tip of wing. . . . Few specimens of this condor have ever been captured, and this is regarded as a prize. If brought to the city it will probably be put in the park menagerie."

Harald built his lodge in 1914, just one year before the opening of the Ridge Route resulted in a parade of cars by his front door, seven days a week. "Sandberg's lodge at the top of the grade was a welcome sight to weary [Los Angeles] motorists still only halfway to Bakersfield," the Los Angeles Times reported. A hotel, restaurant, and cabins were constructed on leased Forest Service land immediately to the south of the homesteaded property.

When first opened in a one-story building, the business was named Sandberg's Summit Hotel. Some time after 1921 the owner turned it into a three-story log hostelry set amid a grove of California live oaks. A crank telephone provided access to the outside world via the long-distance phone circuits that connected Los Angeles with Bakersfield. Cabins also provided lodging behind the hotel.

In 1918, Harald Sandberg was appointed postmaster of the settlement, which was thenceforth named Sandberg, with the post office inside the hotel itself.

"It was a small tourist community," Bakersfield resident Frank Kaufman told Interviewer Harrison Irving Scott (author of a history of the Ridge Route); it had a repair garage that advertised "Labor $2, after 6 p.m. $3; never closed." Motor Stages would stop at Sandberg's for meals, and motorists would hunger for Mrs. (Marion) Sandberg's apple pie.

In September 1929, attorney and real estate developer Ulysses S. Grant Jr., the son of the 18th American president, checked into Sandberg's with his wife and nephew for a visit. He died of a heart attack in his room.

In spring 1934, the lodge was put up for sale. A newspaper classified advertisement described it:

" RESORT SANITARIUM DUDE RANCH SANDBERG'S INN. RIDGE ROUTE. 75 mi. from L.A. by highway. Ideal climate: natural beauty. 100 A. of tree covered level & rolling land. Secluded & quiet. 3-story bldg. with lobby, dining rm., hotel rms., etc. 7 other bldgs. Accommodate 35 guests. Own elec. & water plants. Fully equipt. & furn. to operate now. Sell or TRADE. Phone CRestview 7644 or Box M-285, Times."

Sandberg died on July 9, 1939, and his wife on April 1, 1954.

=== Interregnum ===
By the time of Harald Sandberg's death, there were new operators for the place, a newspaper advertisement having proclaimed:

" Grand Opening and Free Barbecue Sunday, May 28, 1939. Sandberg Lodge and Dude Ranch, Larry Brock proprietor, Harry Moss Manager."

But the hotel never regained its former popularity: An alternate to the Ridge Route was opened, an event that virtually stopped traffic through Sandberg. Nevertheless, J.H. Cox purchased both the lodge and the ranch and, according to Walter W. (Lucky) Stevens, a later owner, Cox tainted the hotel's reputation by allegedly "bringing in booze, slot machines and 'ladies of the night.' " Cox sold the operation to Lillian Grojean, who turned the hotel garage into a ceramics factory; her lease from the Forest Service amounted to $90 a year.

=== Lucky Stevens ===
Lucky Stevens, a sometime film actor, was running a ceramics business in Burbank when he met Grojean. In 1950 or 1951 he paid her $15,000 for the dilapidated hotel, outbuildings, and lease.

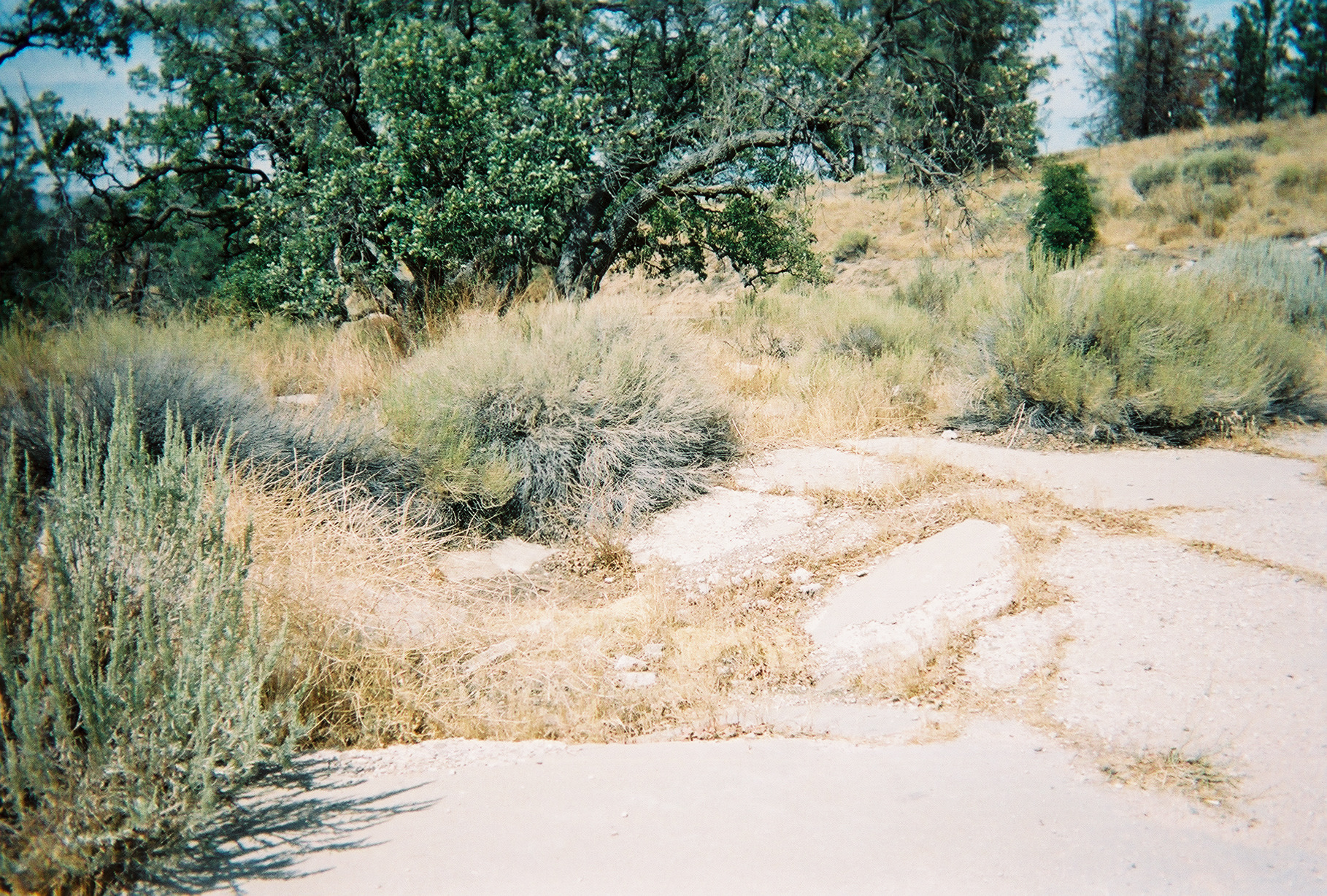
All that was left of the Sandberg Inn in 2006

At first he had plans to install a swimming pool and a fishing pond and to reopen the property as a guest ranch. By that time, the lodge was in disrepair, with pigeons roosting among the rafters. Eight years later, he said he wanted to open the spread of 20 acres (81,000 m^{2}) as a children's ranch, and he did succeed in acquiring money, furniture, and used clothing.

On April 29, 1961, fire destroyed the main lodge. Stevens was alone in the building. A district forest ranger said the blaze was apparently started by sparks from the chimney, and Stevens told an interviewer later that he had been burning trash when the flames began.

The Forest Service canceled Stevens' lease in 1963, and nothing remains on the site today but a historic marker, some stone steps, a bit of foundation, trees, and shrubbery.

== Weather observation and fire station ==
It's just shack on top of a mountain, but the data gathered there is of great importance to the Los Angeles weatherman in determining his forecast.

A four-man weather station was established in 1933 at the windy peak of nearby Bald Mountain, which straddles the boundary between the maritime climate to the south and a drier climate to the north. In 1953, the weather observers had to visually check the instruments and manually transmit the information via Teletype.

In 1978, the Weather Service switched to an automated station, explaining, in the words of Los Angeles Times staff writer Marika Gerrard, that "It was just too hard to find someone to live up in that remote region with nothing to do but record weather statistics every hour on the hour." Nevertheless, in May 1981 reporter Gerrard found two people living at the station — a college student-caretaker and a man experimenting with the prototype of a modular wind turbine.

The other two people living in Sandberg in that month were Willard Sparks, captain of the Quail Lake Fire Station, and his wife, Shirley. Sparks was responsible for covering 300 square miles (800 km^{2}) of forested land that included Sandberg, Gorman, Pyramid Lake, part of the Angeles Forest, and a stretch of Interstate 5 known as "Blood Alley" because of the frequent accidents there.
