= Wilson W. Jones =

Los Angeles politician

Wilson W. Jones was a California Gold Rush pioneer settler in Los Angeles, California, who acted as county clerk and was also a member of the city's governing body, the Los Angeles Common Council. He is said to have been responsible for the Goldwater family of Arizona establishing itself in that state.

Jones was an Easterner whose trek to California was financed by Preston K. Christian. According to the articles of agreement signed by Christian and Marvel M. Jones on May 11, 1850, the other travelers were to be Marvel and Wilson P. Jones, and Christian was to be paid $325 "when they arrive in California."

The above passage refers to a different Wilson W. Jones, and not to the subject of this entry.

Jones became an assistant to Benjamin Davis Wilson, known as "Don Benito," who was elected the first Los Angeles County Clerk in 1850 but who agreed to serve only if Jones would do the actual work; at the same time Jones would receive "all the emoluments of the title." It was explained later by Judge Benjamin Hayes that

Mr. Wilson, occupied with his property, which was fast rising in value and which has been the foundation of a solid fortune, left his office to the care of deputies, among whom Dr. Wilson W. Jones may be mentioned for his efficiency.

In a special election on September 9, 1850, Jones was named to the Los Angeles Common Council. His term ended in May 1851.

Jones was also for a time a part owner of Rancho San Jose de Buenos Ayres, which had been conveyed to him and William T.B. Sanford, an early Los Angeles postmaster. In 1852, Jones sold his half interest in the rancho to Don Benito for $662.75, or 75 cents an acre.

He was a member of the California State Assembly from the First District in 1855–56.

Around 1861 he was part owner of some tin mines in Temescal, California.

It was said that Jones was responsible for the decision of Michael Goldwater, the grandfather of Senator Barry Goldwater, to settle in the territory of Arizona after Michael and his brother Joseph had failed to succeed in a business venture in the Sierra mining town of Sonora, California

The Goldwater brothers did poorly in Sonora and fared no better when they moved to Los Angeles[,] where the brothers had a billiard parlor, bar and a tobacco shop in the Bella Union Hotel. . . . A friendship with a Los Angeles doctor, Wilson W. Jones, turned around the Goldwater story. Dr. Jones had been to the Arizona mining camp at Gila City and convinced Michael of the business possibilities there.

Around 1863 Jones and Michael Goldwater began a freighting business from La Paz to Prescott in Arizona.

On one freighting trip, the Goldwater brothers and Dr. Jones were heading back to the river from Prescott when they were attacked by Mohave Apaches. Doc Jones and Mike were in the lead buggy and Joe was in another buggy just behind them. The Indians began firing and one bullet cut through the doctor's hat, and two shots drilled holes in Mike's hat. Joe was not as fortunate. He was hit in the lower back and another ball lodged in his shoulder. The Indians were driven from their ambush of the Goldwater party by ranchers who had come on the battle scene. Dr. Jones worked on Joe, treating him until the party arrived at a military camp where a surgeon was found. For years Joe carried on his watch chain the ball Dr. Jones had taken from his back.

Jones also lived in Phoenix, Arizona, where his house at 1008 East Buckeye Road is noted as the "oldest standing building" in that city.
