= SS Ada Hancock =

Tender destroyed in 1863 explosion in Los Angeles, California

Coordinates: 33.732°N 118.200°W

History

United States
- Name: Milton Willis (1859–1861); Ada Hancock (1861–1863)
- Owner: Phineas Banning
- Launched: 1859
- Out of service: 27 April 1863
- Homeport: San Pedro Harbor
- Fate: Destroyed in boiler explosion

General characteristics
- Tons burthen: 60 tons bm
- Length: 60 ft (18 m)

SS Ada Hancock was a steam-powered tender owned by Phineas Banning used to transfer passengers and cargo to and from large coastal steamships in San Pedro Harbor in the early 1860s. On April 27, 1863, her boiler exploded in San Pedro Bay, the port of Los Angeles, near Wilmington, California, killing 26 people and injuring many others of the 53 or more passengers on board.

== Ship history ==
The vessel was built at San Pedro in 1859 as a tugboat and originally operated in the harbor there under the name Milton Willis. In 1861 she was bought by Phineas Banning, who renamed her Ada Hancock, after the daughter of his friend Winfield Scott Hancock.

=== Explosion ===
Harris Newmark wrote an account of this maritime disaster in his Sixty years in Southern California, 1853-1913.

Among the worst tragedies in the early annals of Los Angeles, and by far the most dramatic, was the disaster on April 27th to the little steamer Ada Hancock. While on a second trip, in the harbor of San Pedro, to transfer to the Senator the remainder of the passengers bound for the North, the vessel careened, admitting cold water to the engine-room and exploding the boiler with such force that the boat was demolished to the water's edge; fragments being found on an island even half to three-quarters of a mile away.
Such was the intensity of the blast and the area of the devastation that, of the fifty-three or more passengers known to have been on board, twenty-six at least perished. Fortunate indeed were those, including Phineas Banning, the owner, who survived with minor injuries, after being hurled many feet into the air.

Edward Carlson of the 4th California Infantry Regiment remembered:

The day after my arrival at Wilmington, I witnessed one of the most distressing accidents that has ever taken place on this coast. The water in the bay was so shallow that the steamer had to anchor about three or four mile from the wharf; and to land the passengers, baggage, and mail, a small steamer called the Ada Hancock was employed. On her return trip to take the San Francisco bound passengers to the Senator, when about a mile from the wharf, she exploded. A few fellow soldiers and I had walked down from camp to take a sail on the steamer, as was often done by those stationed at the post. The wind, however, was blowing rather cold, and we concluded not to go, and turned back to camp. Hardly had we reached the middle of the wharf when we heard a sharp report, and quickly turning, we saw human bodies and debris flying in the air. The next moment all was still; but in that short moment more than twenty human beings had been hurled into eternity. But an instant before they were full of life, each one with some expectations from his contemplated voyage, each one with some cherished hope for the future, and no thought of death; and there I stood alive and well, who, but for a little chilly wind, would have been among them. Every available craft was manned, and hastened to the point of disaster, and soon the wounded and dead were brought ashore. As a great many of the dead were strangers, it was necessary to examine the bodies, and make record of letters and articles found on them, so that relatives and friends might afterwards claim them. This unpleasant duty fell upon me, in company with others. One poor fellow seemed as if he had fallen asleep; even his clothing showed not the slightest mark of disturbance, except a new pair of pegged boots, from which the soles and heels were completely blown off. But the rest were ghastly to behold and painful to remember.

=== Aftermath ===
Newmark continued:

Mrs. Banning and her mother, Mrs. Sanford, and a daughter of B. D. Wilson were among the wounded; while Miss M. Hereford, Mrs. Wilson's sister and the fiancée of Dr. Myles, was so severely injured that, after long suffering, she also died. Although the accident had happened about five o'clock in the afternoon, the awful news, casting a general and indescribable gloom, was not received in town until nearly eight o'clock; when Drs. Griffin and R. T. Hayes, together with an Army surgeon named Todd, hastened in carriages to the harbor where soldiers from Camp Drum had already asserted their authority. Many of the victims were buried near the beach at New San Pedro.

Frank Lecouvreur employed to take control of Phineas Banning's business affairs while he recovered from his injuries writes about the aftermath:

When I entered the large warehouse, so well known to me, I found it partly turned into a morgue, as more than twelve bodies had already been brought in and stretched out on primitive frames. In some cases it was impossible to recognize them, as even the very features were distorted or torn to pieces. My first duty was, of course, to put order into the interrupted course of business. With a number of good men I started the routine work of assorting a few tons of freight in the warehouse, where the victims had found a temporary resting place. Gruesome as the task was, we tried our best to clear the cloudy sky, but whenever a new body was brought in from the shore and we recognized the well known figure of some honest co-worker, our hearts grew weak and work went on slowly. Then came calls from mourning friends, whose piercing cries would melt the coldest hearts. One by one they finally were laid to rest--and may they rest in peace!

=== The dead ===
Among the dead Newmark listed:

- Thomas W. Seeley, captain of the Senator
- Joseph Bryant, captain of the Ada Hancock
- Dr. H. R. Myles, druggist
- Thomas H. Workman, Banning's chief clerk
- Albert Sidney Johnston Jr., son of Confederate General Albert Sidney Johnston. His father was killed at the Battle of Shiloh one year earlier on April 6th and was the highest-ranking officer killed on either side.
- William T.B. Sanford, postmaster
- Louis Schlesinger
- William Ritchie, "Wells Fargo's messenger, to whom was entrusted ten thousand dollars, which, as far as my memory goes, was lost"
- Two Mormon missionaries, en route to the Sandwich Islands
- Fred E. Kerlin of Fort Tejon: "thirty thousand dollars which he carried with him, in greenbacks, disappeared as mysteriously as did the jewelry on the persons of others, and from these circumstances it was concluded that, even in the presence of Death, these bodies had been speedily robbed."
