= Ridge Route =

Historical highway through Tejon Pass in California

- Ridge Route highlighted in red

Route information
- Length: 44 mi (71 km)
- Existed: 1915–1970
- Component highways: Unsigned California Legislative Route 4 (1915–1964); US 99 after 1926

Major junctions
- South end: US 99 / SR 126 in Castaic Junction
- SR 138 in Gorman
- North end: US 99 in Grapevine

Location
- Country: United States
- State: California
- Counties: Los Angeles, Kern

Highway system
- State highways in California; Interstate; US; State; Scenic; History; Pre‑1964; Unconstructed; Deleted; Freeways
- Ridge Route, Old
- U.S. National Register of Historic Places
- Location within the Los Angeles metropolitan area
- Nearest city: Castaic, California
- Built: 1915
- Architect: W. Lewis Clark and J.B. Woodson
- NRHP reference No.: 97001113
- Added to NRHP: September 25, 1997

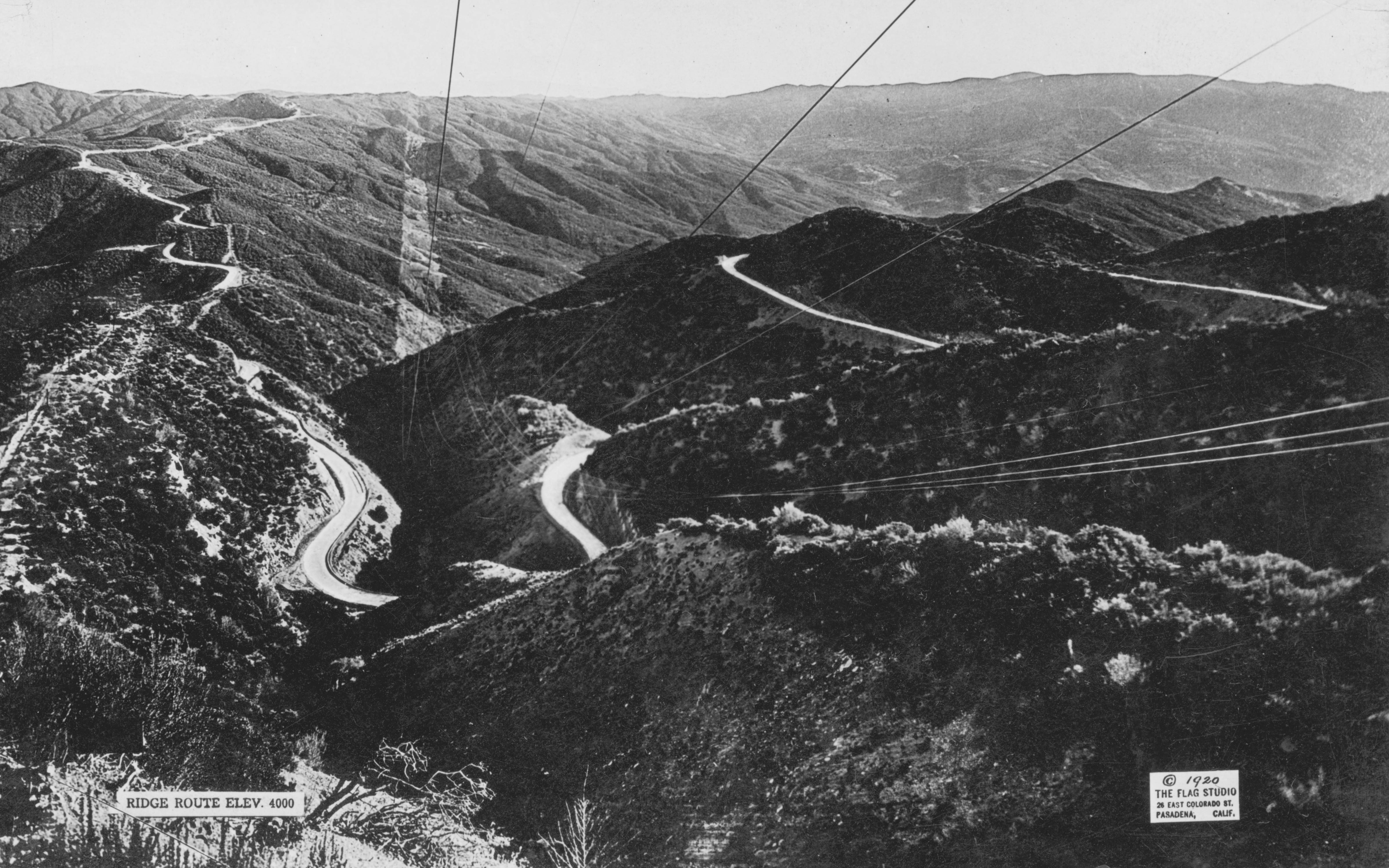
View of the route, 1920

The Ridge Route, officially the Castaic–Tejon Route and colloquially known as the Grapevine, was a two-lane highway between Los Angeles County and Kern County, California, United States. Opened in 1915 and paved with concrete between 1917 and 1921, the road was the first paved highway directly linking the Los Angeles Basin with the San Joaquin Valley (southern Central Valley) over the Tejon Pass and the rugged Sierra Pelona Mountains ridge south of Gorman. Much of the old road runs through the Angeles National Forest, and passes many historical landmarks, including the National Forest Inn, Reservoir Summit, Kelly's Half Way Inn, Tumble Inn, and Sandberg's Summit Hotel. North of the forest, the Ridge Route passed through Deadman's Curve before ending at Grapevine.

The road was originally built as a state highway, a segment of the unsigned Legislative Route 4, before it became signed as part of U.S. Route 99 (US 99) in 1926. The road was then bypassed by the three-lane Ridge Route Alternate to handle increased traffic and remove curves; the Alternate in Los Angeles County was completed in 1933, and Kern County line to Grapevine in 1936. The roadway was widened to a four-lane expressway in 1953 and replaced by an eight-lane freeway, Interstate 5 (I-5) in 1960-70. The portion of the road in the Angeles National Forest was added to the National Register of Historic Places in 1997, by the efforts of retired engineer Harrison Scott. Much of the road has been closed by the U.S. Forest Service; other remnants are used by local traffic.

== Route description ==
The Ridge Route was officially the Castaic–Tejon Route. The official limits of the Ridge Route, as built in the 1910s, were State Route 126 (SR 126) at Castaic Junction and the bottom of the grade at Grapevine. Until 1930 the road from San Fernando to Castaic Junction ran through the Newhall Tunnel at San Fernando Pass and along San Fernando Road, Magic Mountain Parkway (both part of SR 126 until the early 2000s) and Feedmill Road to a former bridge over the Santa Clara River. A 1930 bypass of the tunnel and Newhall through Weldon Canyon is now part of The Old Road.

From Castaic Junction north to Castaic the Ridge Route has been largely buried by the Ridge Route Alternate and Interstate 5. At Castaic the Ridge Route Alternate turned northwest from the old road, now the intersection of Castaic Road and Neely Street. The first piece of Ridge Route Road out of Castaic was realigned as recently as the late 1990s when the North Lake housing development was built. The road begins to climb after passing North Lake; a portion was straightened in 1924 and now is next to the southbound lanes of I-5. In this area, known as the Five-Mile Grade, the four-lane Ridge Route Alternate became the northbound lanes of I-5, while the added four-lane alignment, built to the east (next to the old Ridge Route), had lower grades and became the southbound (downhill) lanes to cut down on runaway trucks. Two bridges were built to allow traffic to cross to the left side. Near the north end of this area, the Ridge Route curves away from the newer bypass. The road enters the Angeles National Forest about one mile (1.6 km) south of Templin Highway, with the Forest Service road designation 8N04.

Establishments in the forest included the National Forest Inn, Kelly's Half Way Inn, Tumble Inn, and Sandberg's Summit Hotel.

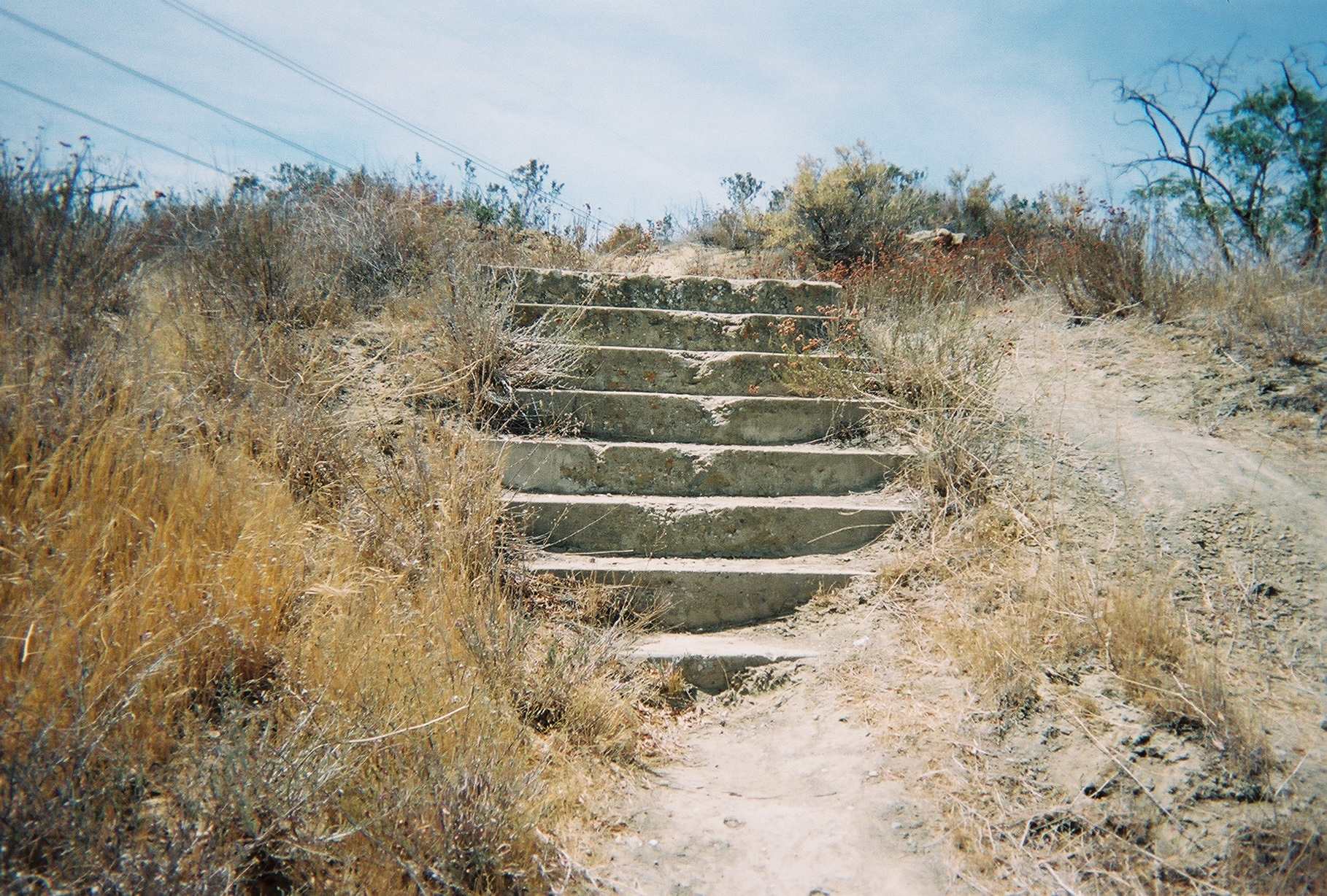
Remains of the steps to the National Forest Inn

The National Forest Inn was on the west side of the road. A popular place, composed of white clapboard buildings, it was described in a 1932 highway beautification pamphlet as "the sort of filling station that gets into a national forest and is no addition thereto". On October 14, 1932, a fire began in the garage, and took over a day to put out. When the Ridge Route Alternate bypassed the site to the west, the inn was not rebuilt, and all that remains are concrete steps.

About two miles (3.2 km) north of the National Forest Inn is Serpentine Drive, where the road curves around the sides of hills as it climbs out of a low point in the route (about 3,200 feet (980 m) above sea level). North of the curves, the road passes through Swede's Cut, also called Big Cut, Culebra Excavation, or Castaic Cut. The cut was the largest on the route, with a depth of 110 feet (34 m).

Reservoir Summit, also called Reservoir Hill, is 3,883 feet (1,184 m) above sea level. The Reservoir Summit Café was a popular high-class restaurant on the east side of the road, closed in the late 1920s; the foundation remains. The summit was named after a now-dry reservoir, one of three probably built for the concrete used in paving the road.

Kelly's Half Way Inn was roughly halfway between Los Angeles and Bakersfield, on a small knoll with a single tree on the east side of the road; all that remains is remnants of the foundation.

The Tumble Inn, later Mountain View Lodge, was on the west side of the road, and closed when the Ridge Route Alternate opened in 1933. Steps, including the top step with "TUMBLE INN" in the concrete, and a retaining wall remain.

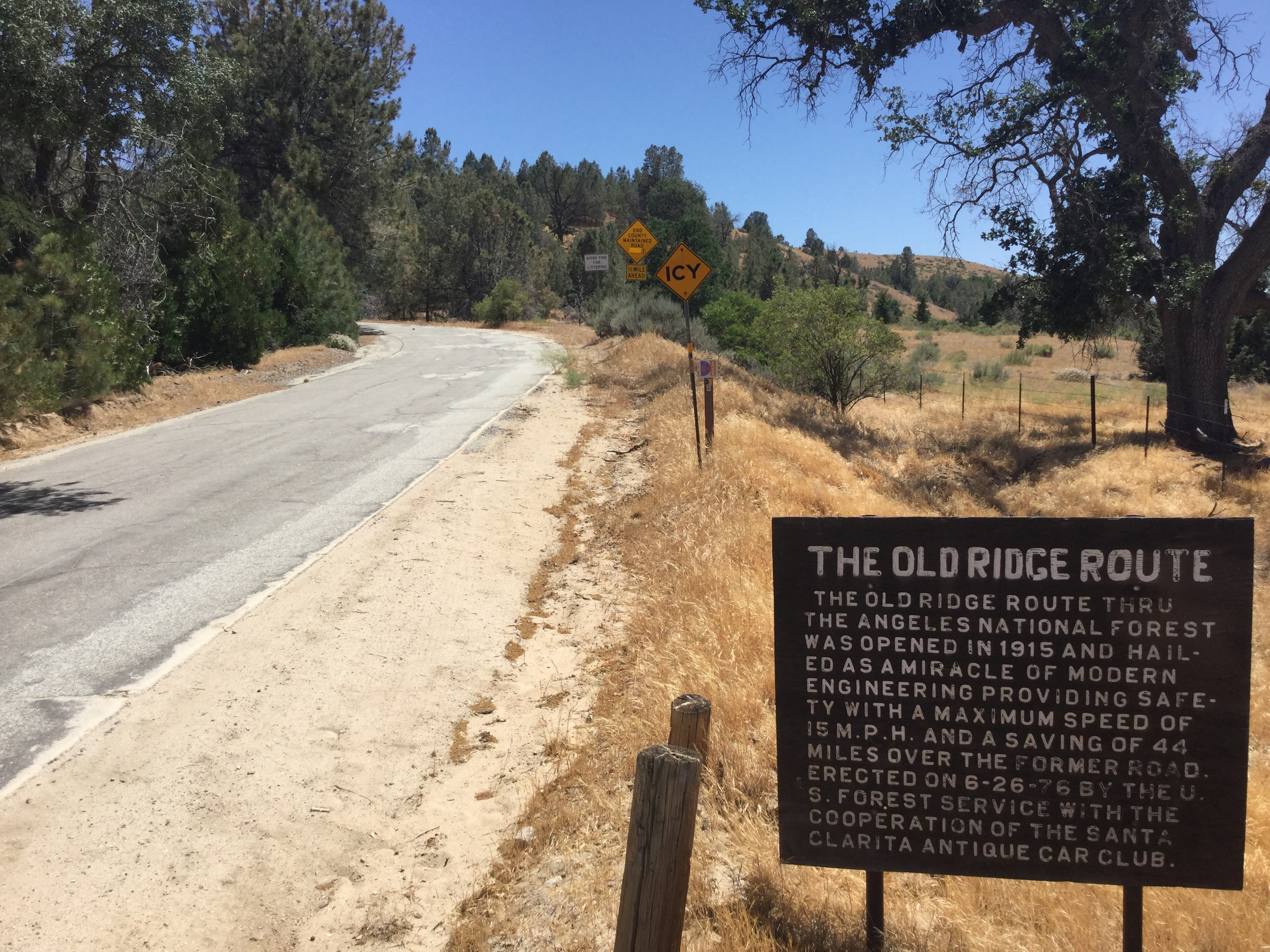
Historical marker

The Sandberg's Summit Hotel, later Sandberg's Lodge, was just north of Liebre Summit, the highest point (4,233 feet (1,290 m)) on the road, at 4,170 feet (1,270 m) above sea level. The hotel was built in 1914 and served travelers from the opening of the road in 1915. Built of logs, it was a high-class hotel. The place, which had become a ceramics factory, burned down on April 29, 1961, from a fire started by the new owner—who was converting it into a "camp-type operation" for underprivileged children—burning trash in the fireplace. The lease from the U.S. Forest Service was canceled in 1963, and only portions of the foundation and a rock wall remain. The name "Sandberg" is still used by the National Weather Service for an automated weather station a short distance to the north at Pine Canyon Road. Pine Canyon Road (CR N2) marks the end of the forest and the beginning of county maintenance, and CR N2 uses the old Ridge Route alignment to reach SR 138 near Quail Lake.

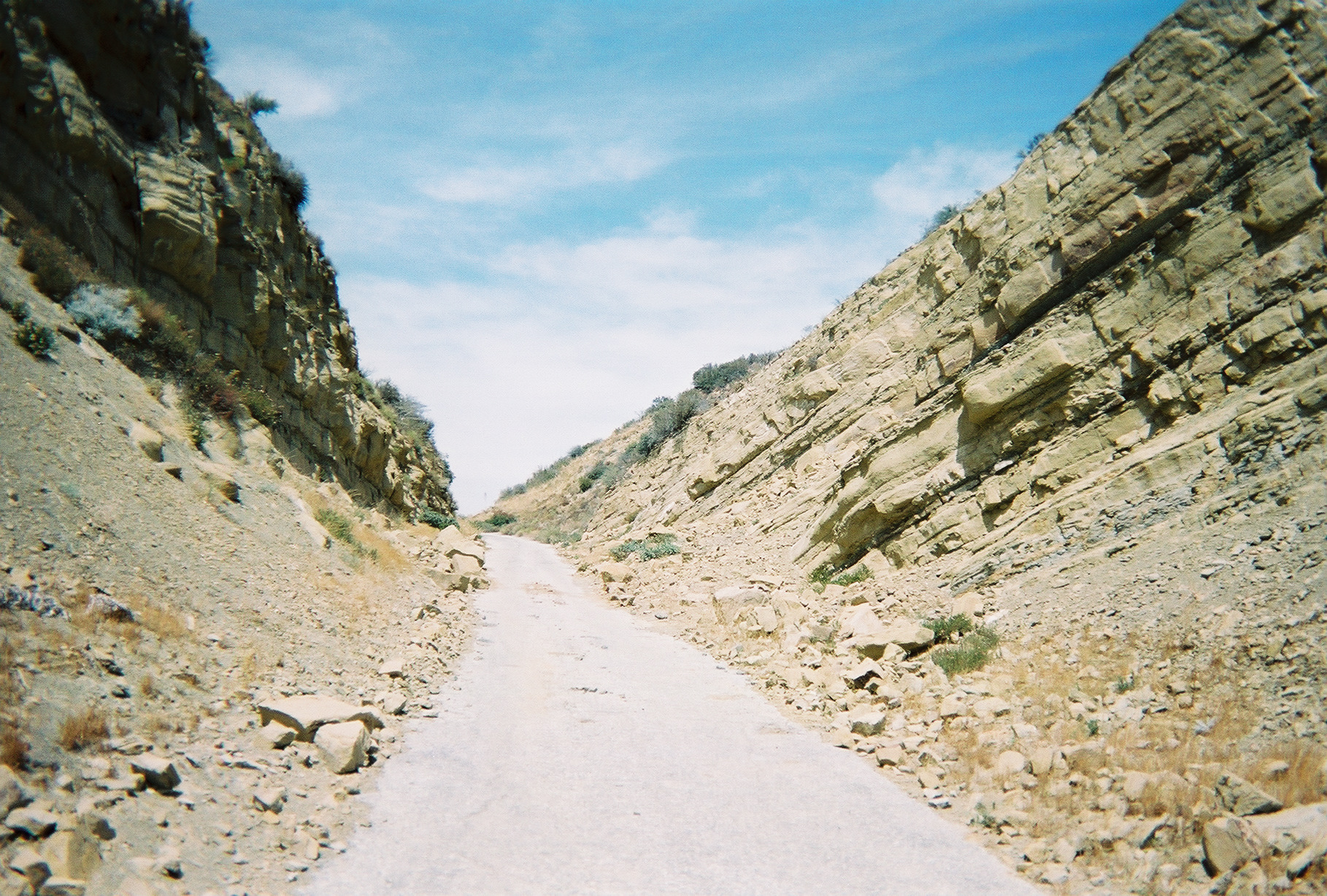
Looking north through Swede's Cut

The Ridge Route crosses the West Branch California Aqueduct with SR 138, splitting to the northwest on Gorman Post Road. It rejoins the path of I-5 at Gorman, and, from Gorman to the end at Grapevine, most of the old road has been covered by the Ridge Route Alternate or I-5. The path of the Ridge Route is now named Peace Valley Road and Lebec Road, passing over Tejon Pass and past Lebec and Fort Tejon. Past Fort Tejon the route descends through Grapevine Canyon to Grapevine (named for grapevines in the area). The best-known curve on the road, Deadman's Curve or Death Curve is visible from Digier Road on the west side of I-5. The next part of the old road that still exists is near the bottom of the grade, where a number of curves brought the road down to Grapevine. The original plan was to build the road nearer to the center of the canyon, but a March 1914 flood destroyed the work, and the grading was redone higher up. Deadman's Curve and the Grapevine loops were both bypassed by the Ridge Route Alternate, which was built directly over most of the old road in this area. At Grapevine the land flattens out, and the road north of Grapevine was the longest straight section of road in the state—17 miles (27 km)—in 1926. Most of this road lies under I-5 and SR 99, but the southernmost piece in Grapevine was bypassed by the Alternate west of it, and is now between southbound and northbound lanes of I-5.

== History ==
=== Before the Ridge Route ===
Before the Ridge Route, roads between Los Angeles and the San Joaquin Valley were less direct. El Camino Real (Spanish, "the King's road"), the first major road in California, connected Los Angeles and the missions, presidios and settlements with San Francisco and Sonoma. The San Joaquin Valley route split from the El Camino Real at present-day Universal City, the western leg running along the Pacific Coast and coastal valleys and the eastern El Camino Viejo, (Spanish, "the old road") via the San Joaquin Valley to San Antonio, now East Oakland.

Another route between Los Angeles and Bakersfield followed the southern approach to the Ridge Route to Saugus, but took a longer route between Saugus and Gorman, heading northeast through the San Francisquito Canyon to the Antelope Valley and west to Gorman. The rest of the route, from Gorman toward Bakersfield via the Tejon Pass, followed the same path as the Ridge Route.

The Butterfield Overland Stage, the first overland mail service to California, went from Tipton, Missouri and Memphis to San Francisco via Los Angeles. From October 1858, when the first stage passed through Tejon Pass, until April 1861, the route was identical to El Camino Viejo, running via San Francisquito Canyon. In order to keep the stages from running directly northwest from San Bernardino and bypassing Los Angeles, the Los Angeles County Board of Supervisors spent $8000 in 1858 (about $225,076 in 2024) to deepen the cut—later Beale's Cut—at San Fernando Pass, south of Saugus and Newhall (east of Sierra Highway, west of the Antelope Valley Freeway or State Route 14). The path followed by the stages was changed to pass along the Pacific Coast from Los Angeles in April 1861.

Similarly, the residents of the City of Los Angeles approved the expenditure of a good deal of money towards the building of the Southern Pacific Railroad, which had originally planned to bypass the city. The line to San Francisco, including the 6,966-foot (2,123 m) San Fernando Tunnel through San Fernando Pass, was completed on September 5, 1876. The railroad's route between Saugus and Bakersfield was even longer than that of El Camino Viejo and the Butterfield Overland Stage, heading east through Soledad Canyon before turning north via Palmdale to Mojave and northwest over Tehachapi Pass.

In the 1910s several power companies built lines through the area. The General Pipe Line Company completed an oil pipeline connecting the San Joaquin Valley's Midway-Sunset Oil Field with the port at San Pedro in 1913. Its alignment followed the Ridge Route north of Gorman and south of Reservoir Summit, a longer distance than any of the earlier transportation routes, but from Gorman south to the present location of Pyramid Lake, where it turned east to Reservoir Summit, it roughly followed the later Ridge Route Alternate. That same year, the Midway Gas Company opened a natural gas line, and the Pacific Light and Power Company opened a power line, both staying fairly close to the entire Ridge Route.

The two general routes followed by the Butterfield Overland Stage and the Southern Pacific Railroad—known respectively as the Tejon Pass Route and the Tehachapi or Midway Route—were the main automobile routes between Los Angeles and the San Joaquin Valley around the start of the 20th century. The State Bureau of Highways recommended in 1895 that a more direct route be built to shorten this distance. A bond issue was approved in 1909 and 1910 to build a state highway system, including the Ridge Route. The new California Highway Commission was unable to raise funds in the East, but Los Angeles again contributed funds to ensure that construction would go forward.

These routes all shared the roadway south of Saugus, which was generally flat but included the crossing of San Fernando Pass. As discussed earlier, this was deepened at the county's expense in 1858. The California State Legislature authorized a turnpike in 1861, and it was completed in 1863, then owned by Edward Fitzgerald Beale. The cut, which came to be known as Beale's Cut, was deepened by Beale, and lowered once more by the county in 1904. To improve the crossing, the county bypassed the cut with the narrow 435-foot (133 m) Newhall Tunnel, for railroad traffic only, which opened in October 1910.

=== Construction ===
The California Highway Commission considered several easterly routes between Saugus and Gorman: Soledad Canyon (used by the Southern Pacific) had frequent washouts; Mint Canyon (used by the Midway Route) was too long and cost too much; Bouquet Canyon (used by both automobile routes) had bad drainage; and San Francisquito Canyon (used by the Tejon Pass Route) was steep and narrow. Another possible route, through Piru Canyon to the west, was rejected because of a proposal for a dam. This route was later chosen for the Ridge Route Alternate, but had to be abandoned in the 1970s due to the construction of Pyramid Lake.

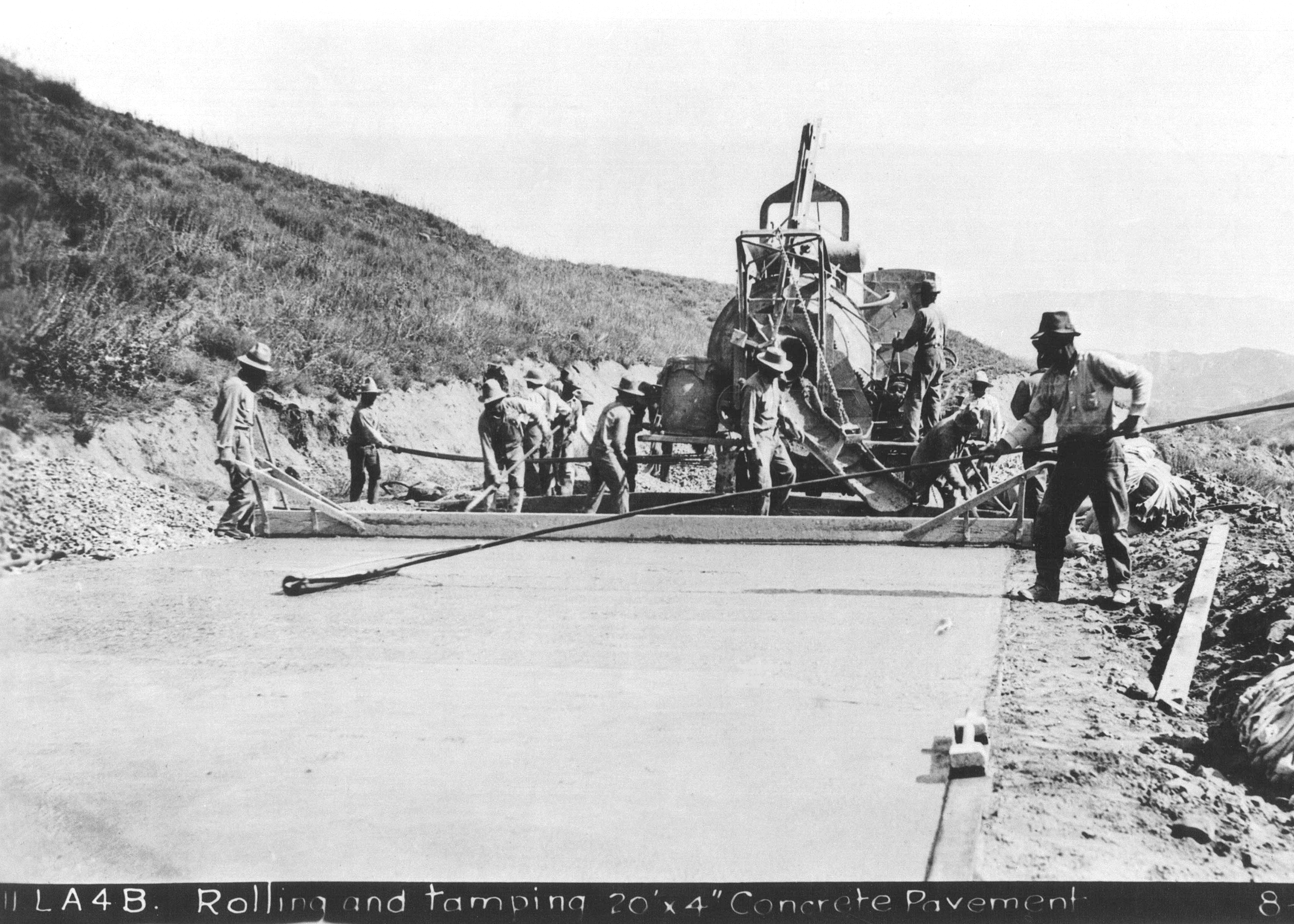
Leveling concrete pavement on the original Ridge Route, 1915

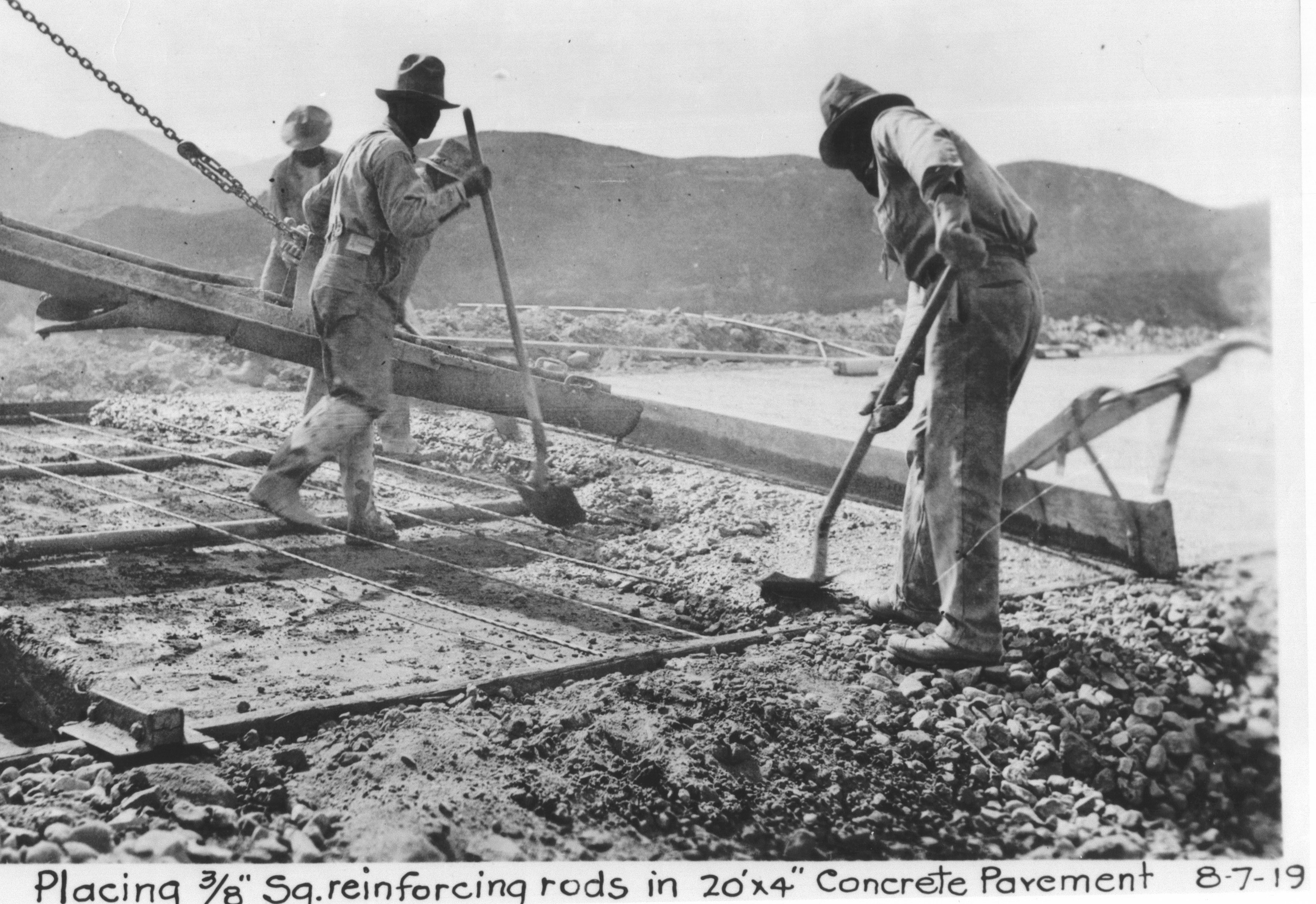
Reinforcing concrete, 1919

The route chosen was direct from Saugus to Gorman, over the top of the ridge for many miles. Due to cost and drainage concerns, and a desire to reduce altering the terrain, the road was built with 697 curves, high in the mountains. Construction on the Ridge Route, officially considered to run from Castaic Junction (west of Saugus on the road to Ventura) to the bottom of the grade at Grapevine, began in 1914. The highway was one of the earliest projects completed by the California Highway Commission. Horse-drawn scrapers were used.

The new road, designed with an ideal grade of 6 percent (but with several 7 percent grades, including at Grapevine,) cut the distance by 24 miles (39 km) over the Tejon Pass Route or 58 miles (93 km) over the Midway Route. A speed limit of 15 miles per hour (24 km/h) was enforced between Castaic and Quail Lake, making the trip from Los Angeles to Bakersfield take about 12 hours. On the Ridge Route between Castaic Junction and Grapevine, the curves added up to about 109.5 complete circles, with a minimum radius of 70 feet (21 m). The unpaved road, which had cost $450,000 (about $10.1 million in 2024), opened in October 1915.

In addition to being part of the state highway system (as a portion of the unsigned Sacramento-Los Angeles Legislative Route 4), the road was part of the National Park to Park Highway, a privately designated auto trail, and became part of US 99 in 1926. The continuation south via Saugus and the Newhall Tunnel towards Los Angeles, also part of Route 4, was added to the state highway system in 1917.

The San Francisco Chronicle called the new route "one of the most remarkable engineering feats accomplished by the State Highway Commission. It is Southern California's Magnus Opus [sic] in mountain highway construction." It was also credited with stopping efforts to split California into two states, by linking its two halves over the rugged terrain separating them.

Work on paving the Ridge Route with 4-inch (100 mm) thick reinforced concrete began in 1917, but was delayed until 1919 by the U.S. entry into World War I. During work on the road, traffic was detoured via Mint and Bouquet Canyons. The road reopened on November 15, 1919, completely paved except north of Lebec, including the grade at Grapevine, which was only oiled. After a bond issue was passed in July 1919, this portion was paved from September 1919 to May 1921; the dangerous detour during the paving included a 20 percent grade. The paving added about $1 million to the cost, for a total price of about $1.5 million (about $20.8 million in 2024), which was not paid off until 1965. Asphalt was added on top of the concrete for 20 miles (32 km) south from Swede's Cut in 1922, and in 1924 a number of blind curves were widened and straightened.

=== Bypasses and the fate of the bypassed road ===
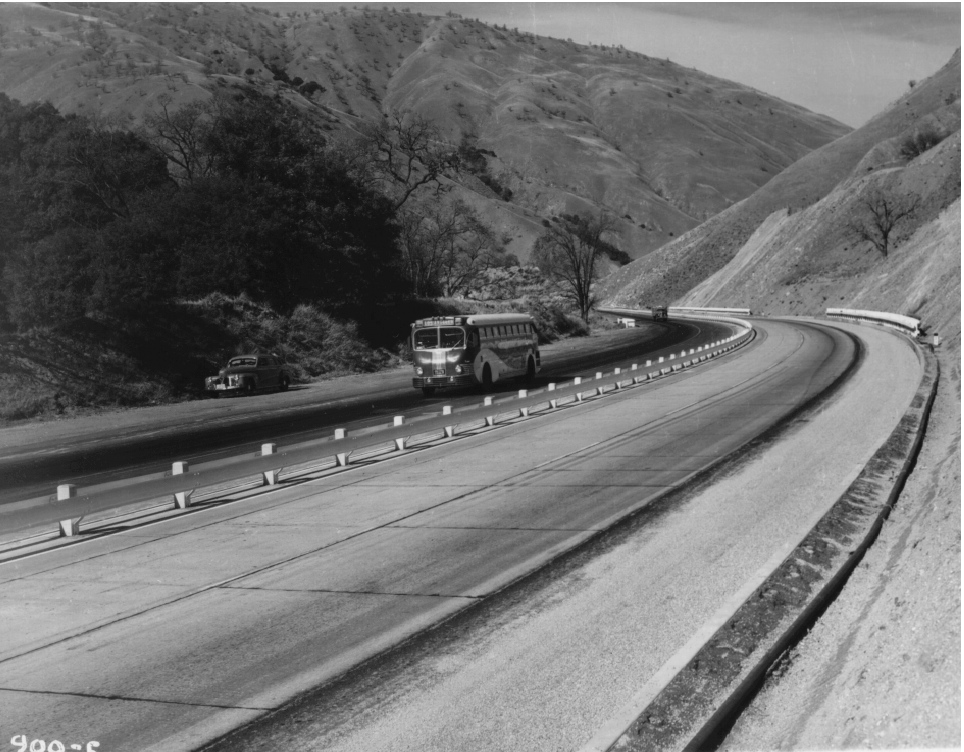
Ridge Route Bypass in 1943, looking north towards Grapevine

In 1929 the state decided to build a new bypass of the central portion through Piru Canyon, and to upgrade the north portion over Tejon Pass and down the hill to Grapevine. This Ridge Route Alternate, or Ridge Alternate Highway, shortened the route by 9.6 miles (15.4 km) and increased the minimum curve radius from 70 to 1,000 feet (21 to 305 m). This was done for the safety of the road, which had many accidents, and to increase the road's capacity. The old highway was to be relinquished to Los Angeles County and incorporated into the county road system. Construction began in 1930, and the road south of Tejon Pass opened on October 29, 1933; replacement of the Grapevine grade was completed in 1936. The three-lane road, with a center "suicide" passing lane, cost $3.5 million (about $62 million in 2024), paid for by the state gas tax. It was estimated that it would pay itself off in 2.5 years with the savings in time and gas. A new bypass of the Newhall Tunnel, through Weldon Canyon, had opened on May 28, 1930, giving drivers a better route all the way from Los Angeles to Bakersfield. The roadway was widened to an expressway by 1952 at a cost of $13.5 million (about $128 million in 2024), with two lanes in each direction and a center median, but still with at-grade intersections.

Even this four-lane Ridge Route Alternate was not adequate for the traffic, and the first section of eight-lane freeway I-5 with a minimum curve radius of 3,000 feet (910 m) opened in 1960 in Grapevine. Large parts of the Ridge Route Alternate were incorporated into the new roadway, but the area through the present Pyramid Lake was completely bypassed. I-5 over the mountains between Castaic Junction and Grapevine was completed on August 24, 1970, at a cost of $103 million (about $640 million in 2024).

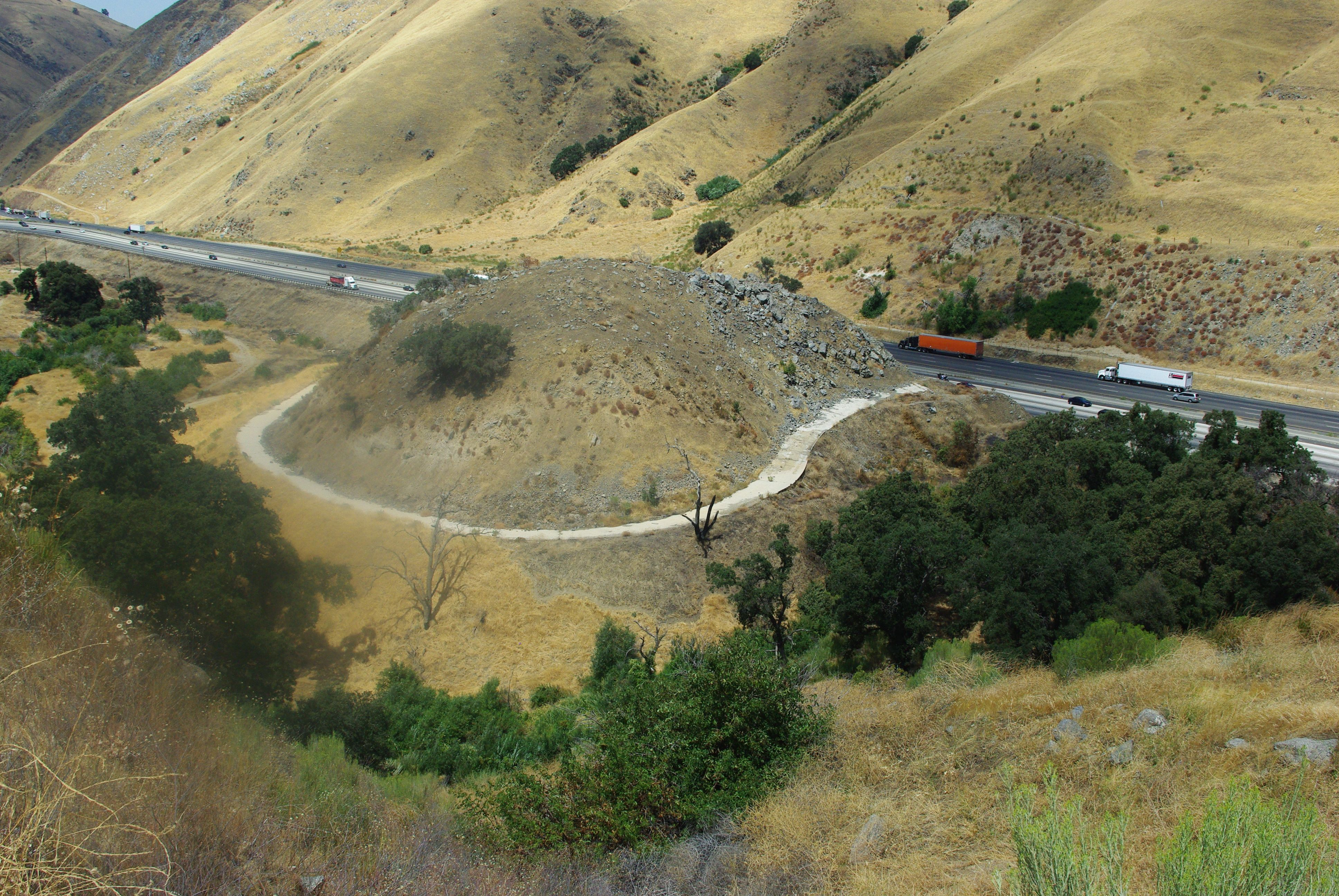
Deadman's Curve on the 1915 Ridge Route in Lebec, abandoned when US 99 (later upgraded to I-5) was built over Tejon Pass

Portions of the old road continued to exist as a county road. The longest preserved segment was the part bypassed by the Ridge Route Alternate, between Castaic and SR 138 near Sandberg, including the portion through the Angeles National Forest. The road for about two miles (3.2 km) south from SR 138 is part of CR N2.

Harrison Scott, a retired engineer, was traveling north on I-5 with his son in 1991, when his son speculated about the difficulty of driving over the first road through the rugged terrain. Having some extra time, and recalling a drive on the old road in 1955, they left the freeway and traveled along most of the abandoned section. Near SR 138, Scott asked a county road crew which was resurfacing the road if it was still maintained by the county, and the crew replied that they didn't know who maintained it through the desert. It turned out that the county officially owned it but did not maintain it; Scott has since convinced the county and forest to exchange ownership with the Santa Anita Canyon Road, then a county road.

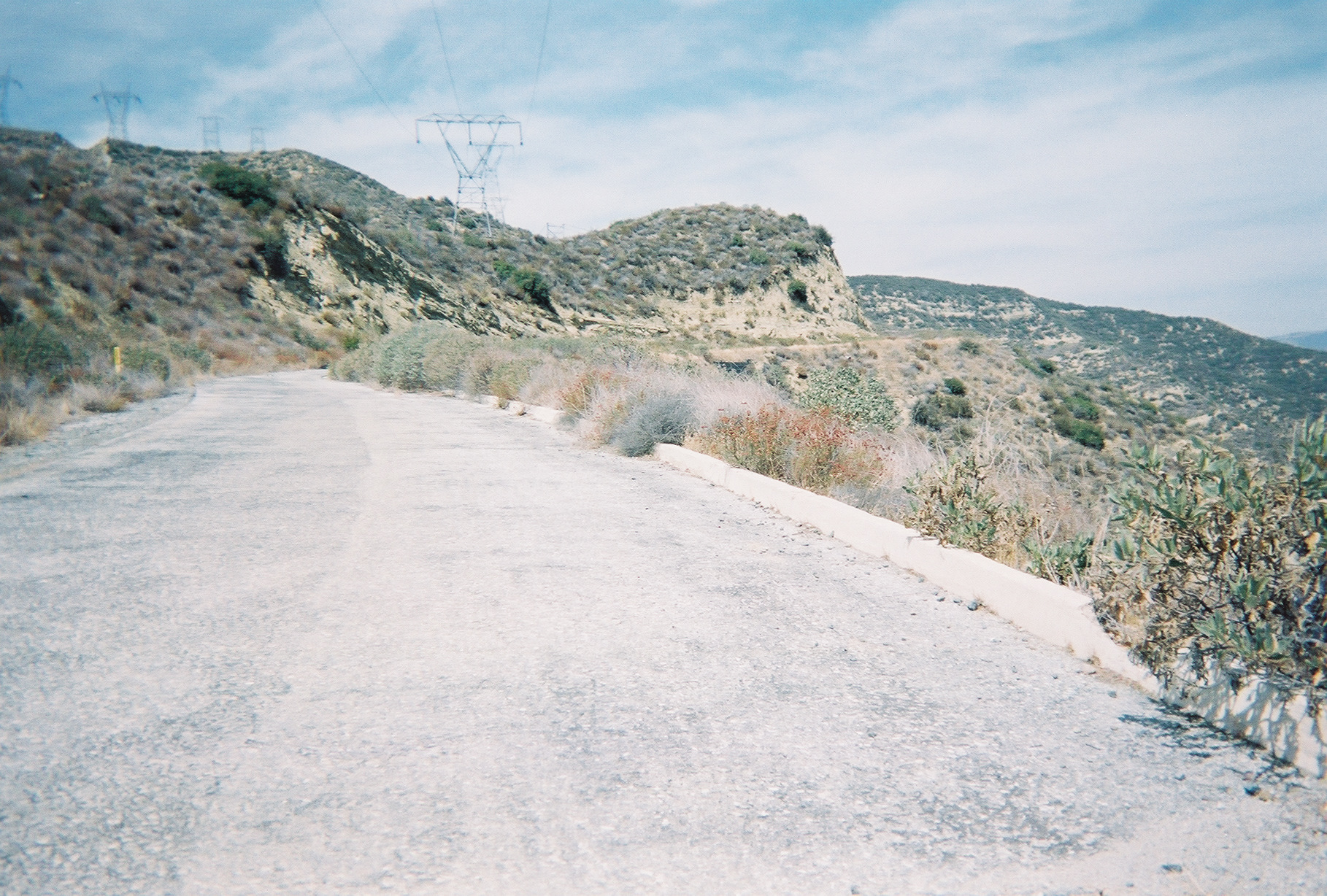
Stretch of original pavement and curb in 2007

For the next six years Scott worked to get the road added to the National Register of Historic Places, and finally succeeded when, on September 25, 1997, the National Park Service added the 17.6 miles (28.3 km) in the forest to the National Register. He later used his research for the National Register application to write a book, Ridge Route: The Road That United California, published in 2002. The Ridge Route was also designated as a California Historic Civil Engineering Landmark by the American Society of Civil Engineers in 2008.

The route was repaired in 2005 following heavy rainfall, but the road was not reopened as of early 2013, due to objections from Angeles National Forest officials.

== Major intersections ==
County	Location	mi	km	Destinations	Notes
Los Angeles	Castaic Junction	0	0.0	US 99 south – Santa Clarita, Los Angeles; SR 126	Road continues as US 99 south
Los Angeles	Gorman	30	48	SR 138 east – Lancaster, Palmdale	
Kern	Grapevine	44	71	US 99 north – Bakersfield	Continuation north; now Grapevine Road
1.000 mi = 1.609 km; 1.000 km = 0.621 mi

== See also ==
- 1857 Fort Tejon earthquake
- Mountain Communities of the Tejon Pass
