= Three Points, California =

Unincorporated community in California, United States

- Unincorporated community
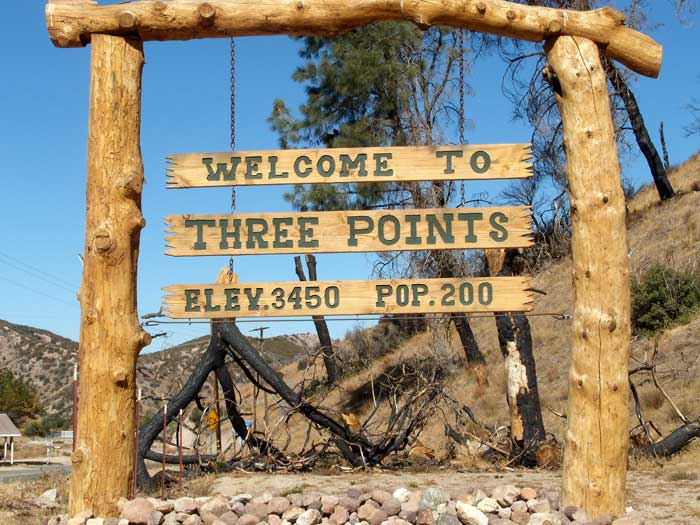
- Three Points welcome sign and fire-burned trees

- Location within California Location within the United States
- Coordinates: 34.7358155°N 118.5986976°W
- Country: United States
- State: California
- County: Los Angeles
- Time zone: UTC-8 (Pacific)
  - Summer (DST): UTC-7 (Pacific Daylight Time)
- ZIP code: 93532, served by Lake Hughes
- Area code: 661

Three Points is a scenic, sparsely populated unincorporated community at the northwestern edge of Los Angeles County, in the northern Sierra Pelona Mountains foothills and southwest of the Antelope Valley in Southern California, United States.

== Geography ==
The settlement is on the northern edge of the Angeles National Forest, on the east side of Oakgrove Canyon where it opens out into Pine Canyon, 17.5 miles (28 km) north of Castaic. Its elevation is 3,424 feet.

A roadside welcome sign said in 1991 that the Three Points population was 150. In 2008 a newer sign gave the population as 200.

Three Points and Lake Hughes are essentially just wide spots in the road, a few homes and businesses scattered along a dry, brushy gully that marks the course of the San Andreas fault. The combined population of the two communities is about 500.

— Los Angeles Times, June 16, 1991

== History ==
=== 1880s — 1970s ===
Three Points was homesteaded in 1892 by the Lafferty family, 83-year-old Laura May Lafferty told a reporter in 1991. Her grandmother acted as a midwife, and her father, Ben Cherbbono, was a French Canadian muleskinner who led a team that helped grade the Ridge Route highway in the early part of the 20th century. Gookins Lake in the area was named after her mother's family, she said.

In those days, Three Points was graced with a one-room schoolhouse, Pine Canyon School, where in 1953 Mrs. Lillie Knighton taught children aged 6 to 14; in midwinter, a “huge pot-bellied stove . . . hissed with heat.” The school also acted as a community center; movies related to classwork were shown each Thursday night, open to adults.

Apart from the school, a tavern variously called the Three Point Cafe, Maxine's, and Nancy's Up the Road Cafe, was another center of social life. Bert Gookins was the first owner and builder — sometime in 1912, or maybe 1924, Bert Hart, Gookins’ grandson, recalled. It was a grocery store once, Hart said, and perhaps the restaurant and bar were added in the 1930s or 1940s. The building was occasionally occupied by a traveling dentist who used a foot-powered drill.

=== 1980s on ===
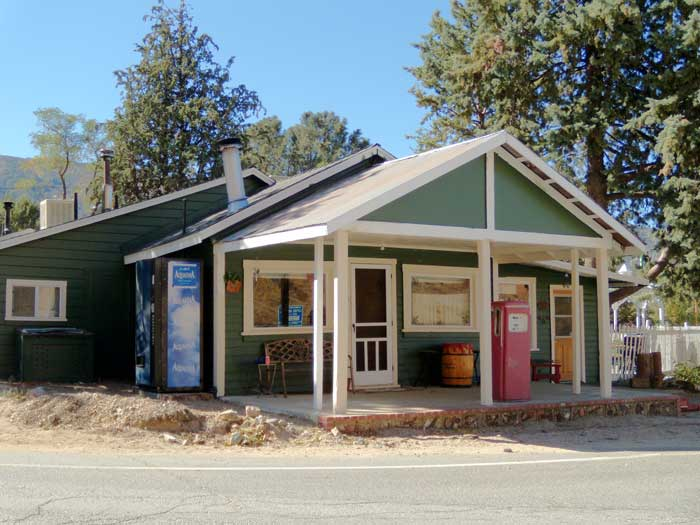
Former cafe was turned into a private residence.

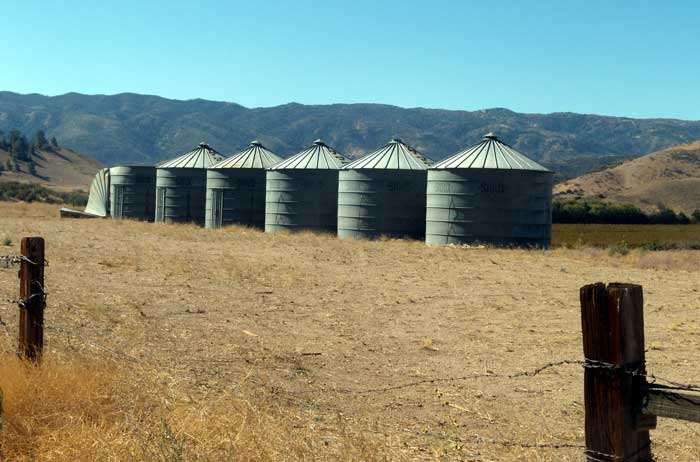
Grain silos south of the Three Points settlement,

Michael and Anita Felix bought the cafe in 1984 with the idea of using its park-like grounds for special events. Two years later, Anita had a heart attack and so the Felixes began leasing it to other operators. When Maxine Martin had it in 1991 it was a combination bar, restaurant, social club and video-rental store featuring a decor that included

a jukebox, animal traps, rattlesnake skins, guns, old photographs, dollar bills pinned to the wall, a bottle of pickled pig feet and a sign that says “All tabs must be paid by the end of the month.”

In November 1994 the Felixes resumed managing the cafe — but they opened it only on Saturdays and Sundays, and soon thereafter they put it up for sale.

In 2008 it was a private residence: An unusable gasoline pump in front was purely decorative, and the only sign of commerce was an outside vending machine that dispensed bottled water.

== Government ==
As an unincorporated community, there is no local government, but there is a Three Points–Liebre Mountain Town Council, which in March 2009 was working on a community standards district document and on emergency preparedness.

=== Education ===
There is no longer a public school in the settlement. Three Points is part of the Westside Union School District of West Lancaster, which operates Del Sur, Joe Walker, Hill View, Cottonwood, Rancho Vista, Sundown, Valley View, Leona Valley, and Quartz Hill schools, through the eighth grade.

The community is within the Antelope Valley Union High School District and the Antelope Valley Community College District.

=== Library ===
The Los Angeles County public library's Antelope Valley bookmobile is at Three Points from 10 to 10:45 a.m. on Saturdays.

== Fire danger ==
Three Points was settled in a wooded valley shrouded in volatile pine trees, near a mountain fittingly named Burnt Peak, and the town has been threatened by wildfires many times over the decades. The earliest story about Three Points in the Los Angeles Times, the closest metropolitan newspaper to the settlement, is dated August 24, 1927, and, like many such articles thereafter, it was reporting on a massive fire in the forested area.

AID SENT IN BRUSH FIRE : Blaze Unchecked on Ridge Route Hundred Men and Supplies Rush to Help 700 Already on Job Flames Advance to Three Points in Pine Canyon; No Lives Menaced.

Twenty-two years later, in 1949, another fire in the canyon made the news:

A freakish south-southeast wind which sprang up suddenly yesterday afternoon sent the Sawmill Mountain fire in the Angeles National Forest raging out of control again threatening 75 homes in the Three Points settlement, 16 miles west of Lake Hughes.

In July 2004, the Times reported:

two houses burned in Three Points, a place defined by the only business in town, a little red-shingled restaurant named the Three Point Cafe. A third house in the area burned Thursday.
