= Newhall Pass =

Mountain pass in Los Angeles County, California

- San Fernando Pass, Fremont Pass, Beale's Cut
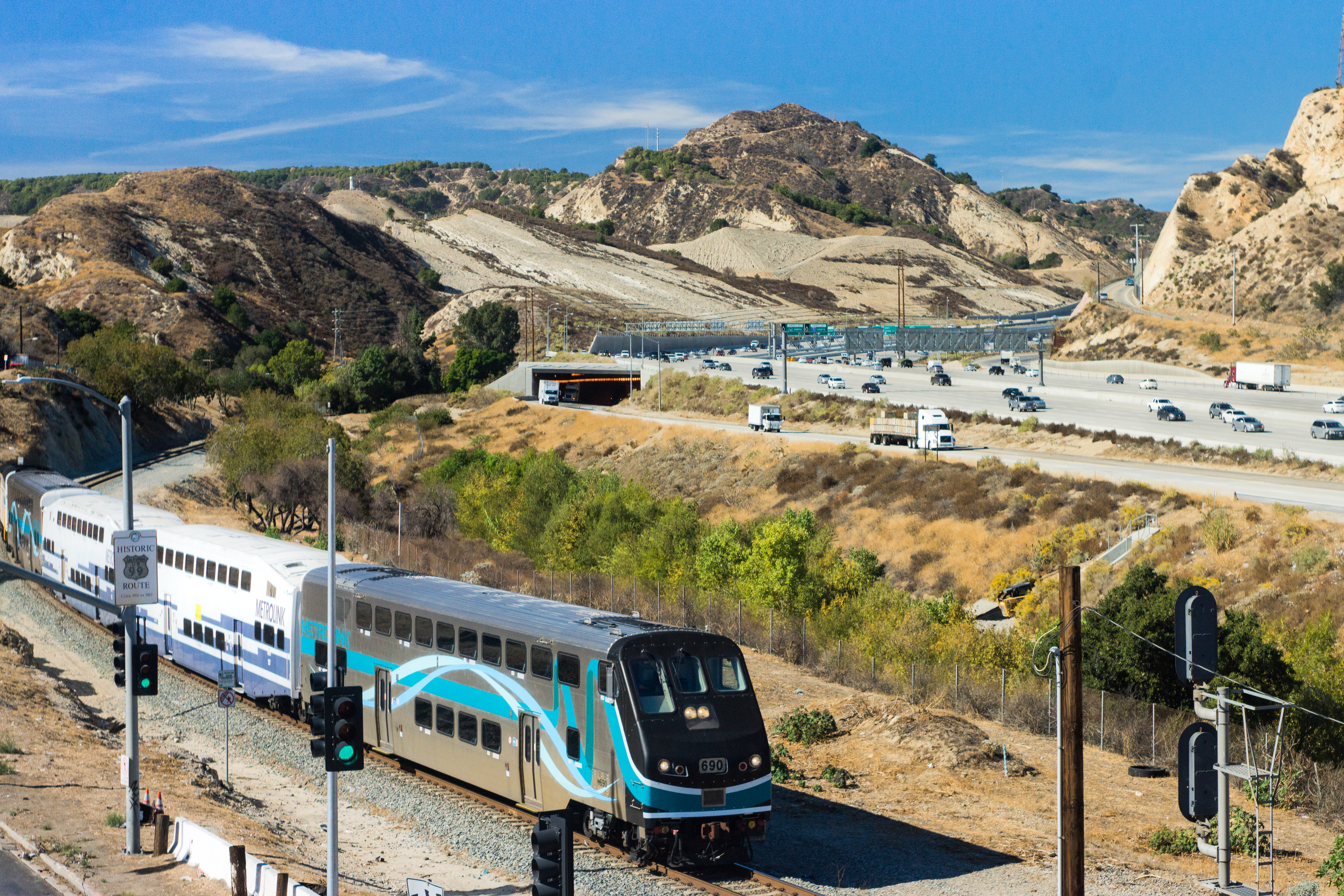
- Metrolink train travels south on the Antelope Valley Line through the Newhall Pass, next to Interstate 5 in 2014

- Location within Santa Clarita Location within San Fernando Valley Location within the Los Angeles metropolitan area Location within California
- Elevation: 1,755 ft (535 m)
- Traversed by: I-5; SR 14; SR 14U; Metrolink: Antelope Valley

Third Approach
- Location: Los Angeles County, California
- Range: Santa Susana Mountains; San Gabriel Mountains
- Coordinates: 34.3458°N 118.5101°W
- Topo map: Oat Mountain, CA

Newhall Pass is a low mountain pass in Los Angeles County, California. Historically called Fremont Pass and San Fernando Pass, with Beale's Cut, it separates the Santa Susana Mountains from the San Gabriel Mountains. Although the pass was visited in August 1769 by Catalan explorer Gaspar de Portolá, it eventually was named for Henry Newhall, a significant businessman in the area during the 19th century.

Newhall Pass links the San Fernando Valley to the Santa Clarita Valley and is a main entry to the Greater Los Angeles area. The pass is known for the massive Newhall Pass interchange and the historic San Fernando Tunnel.

Weather conditions in the pass can vary from triple-digit heat in the summer to rare below-freezing temperatures in winter. Snow is possible from December to February, but is quite uncommon; when it does occur, it can lead to heavy traffic and accidents. The pass also is susceptible to heavy flooding during La Niña and El Niño events. Wildfires have also occasionally closed down the pass and California State Route 14.

== History ==
Newhall Pass was initially named "Fremont Pass" for General John C. Frémont, who was thought to have passed through it in 1847 on his way to sign the Treaty of Cahuenga, but he actually went slightly east of the pass on the El Camino Viejo.

=== Lyons Station ===
In 1853, a Los Angeles businessman, Henry Clay Wiley, installed a windlass atop the Fremont Pass to speed and ease the ascent and descent of the steep Santa Clara Divide. He also built a tavern, hotel and stable nearby. In 1854, Wiley sold out to Sanford and Cyrus Lyon and it began to be called Lyons Station. At the same time, Phineas Banning obtained the business of supplying Fort Tejon.

=== Beale's Cut ===
The steep pass was made easier to cross when a deep slot-like road was cut through the "San Fernando Mountain" by Charles H. Brindley, Andrés Pico, and James R. Vineyard. In return for helping tame the most daunting obstacle along the Fort Tejon Road, the main inland route from Los Angeles to the north, the State of California awarded them a twenty-year contract to maintain the turnpike and collect tolls. Butterfield Overland Mail, a stagecoach that operated mail between St. Louis, Missouri, and San Francisco, began using it directly.

In 1861, a landowner and surveyor named Edward Beale was appointed by President Abraham Lincoln as the federal Surveyor General of California and Nevada. Beale challenged General Pico's loyalty to the new president and in 1863, Beale was awarded the right to collect the toll in the pass. Beale maintained rights to the cut for the next twenty years and so it became known as "Beale's Cut."

Beale's Cut was eventually deepened to 90 feet (27.4 m). It lasted as a transportation passage in the neighborhood of present-day Newhall Pass until construction of the Newhall Tunnel was completed in 1910.

Beale's Cut appeared in many silent western movies. The location became a favorite of movie producers like John Ford and D. W. Griffith. In Ford's 1923 film Three Jumps Ahead, American cowboy star Tom Mix is filmed jumping over the pass, although it has been widely debated among film historians whether Mix made the jump, with any of a number of stuntmen claiming credit for it, while some experts believe the jump was achieved purely through special effects. John Ford used the location in at least four films over a twenty-year period beginning as early as 1917.

Still in existence today, it is no longer passable by automobiles. It suffered a partial collapse during the Northridge Earthquake, on January 17, 1994, and now is about 30 feet (9.1 m) deep. It is visible from the Sierra Highway about one mile north from the intersection of The Old Road and Sierra Highway, just after the first bridge under SR 14. It lies between Sierra Highway and the new freeway, about a quarter mile to the northeast of a stone marker. Beale's Cut is difficult to find today. because it is fenced off and not close enough to the Sierra Highway to be easily seen.

=== Newhall Pass ===
In 1910, the 435 ft (133 m) Newhall Auto Tunnel was built by Los Angeles County a quarter-mile northwest of Beale's Cut. However, two-way traffic through the tunnel was slow, because it was only 17.5 ft (5.3 m) wide.

The California Division of Highways decided to replace the tunnel. In July 1938, work started to remove the rock above the tunnel to create a four-lane highway. The road was first known as Highway 6, then Highway 14, and finally the present-day Sierra Highway. The cut for the tunnel is located to the west of today's Highway 14, and east of Gates King Open Space.

The pass is named after the local businessman Henry Newhall, whose land holdings formed the basis of the city of Santa Clarita. Newhall came to California from Saugus, Massachusetts during the California gold rush in 1850. Over time he purchased a number of properties in the state, the most significant being the 46,460-acre (18,802 ha) Rancho San Francisco in northern Los Angeles County. Within this territory, he granted a right-of-way to Southern Pacific Railroad through what is now Newhall Pass, and he also sold them a portion of the land, upon which the company built a town they named after him, Newhall. The first station built on the line he named for his hometown, Saugus. After his death in 1882 his family incorporated the Newhall Land and Farming Company.

Newhall Pass remains a main traffic route, as the Newhall Pass interchange of Interstate 5 (Golden State Freeway) and California State Route 14 (Antelope Valley Freeway), as well as Sierra Highway, Foothill Boulevard, and San Fernando Road travel through the pass.

=== San Fernando Tunnel ===
The 6,940-foot-long (2,115.3 m) San Fernando railroad tunnel was begun in March 1875 and took a year and a half to complete. Over 1,500 mostly Chinese laborers took part in its construction, which began at the south end of the mountain. Many of them had prior experience working on Southern Pacific's tunnels in the Tehachapi Pass. Due to the sandstone composition of the mountain that was saturated with water and oil, frequent cave-ins occurred and the bore had to be constantly shored up by timbers during excavation.

The initial location for the north end of the tunnel was near Lyons Station Stagecoach Stop, which was abandoned due to frequent cave-ins caused by oil-soaked rock. The north end was moved a little further west towards the present town of Newhall, California. The north end of the tunnel excavation commenced in June 1875. Water was a constant problem during construction and pumps were utilized to keep the tunnel from flooding. Workers digging from both the north and south ends of the tunnel came face to face on July 14, 1876. The bores from each end were only a half inch out of line with dimensions of 22 feet (6.7 m) high, 16.5 feet (5.0 m) wide at the bottom and over 18 feet (5.5 m) at the shoulders. Track was laid in place during the tunnel dig and was used to remove dirt and rock by horse-pulled cars. The first train passed through the tunnel on August 12, 1876. On September 4 Charles Crocker notified Southern Pacific that the track had been completed on the route between San Francisco and Los Angeles.

Metrolink's Antelope Valley Line and the Union Pacific Railroad (formerly the Southern Pacific Railroad) go through the Newhall Pass via the San Fernando Tunnel.

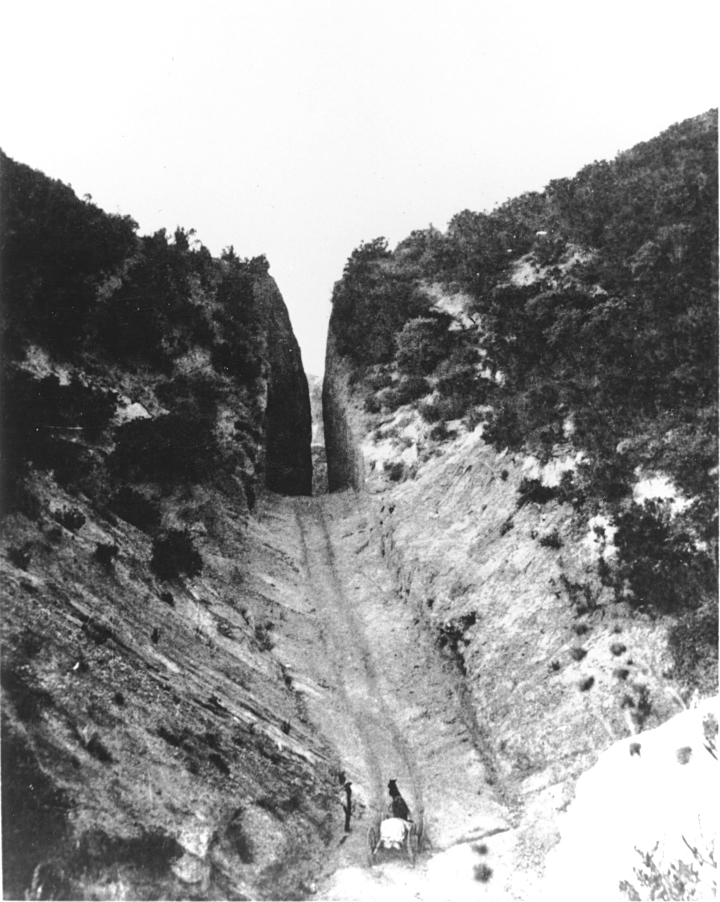
Beale's Cut in 1872.

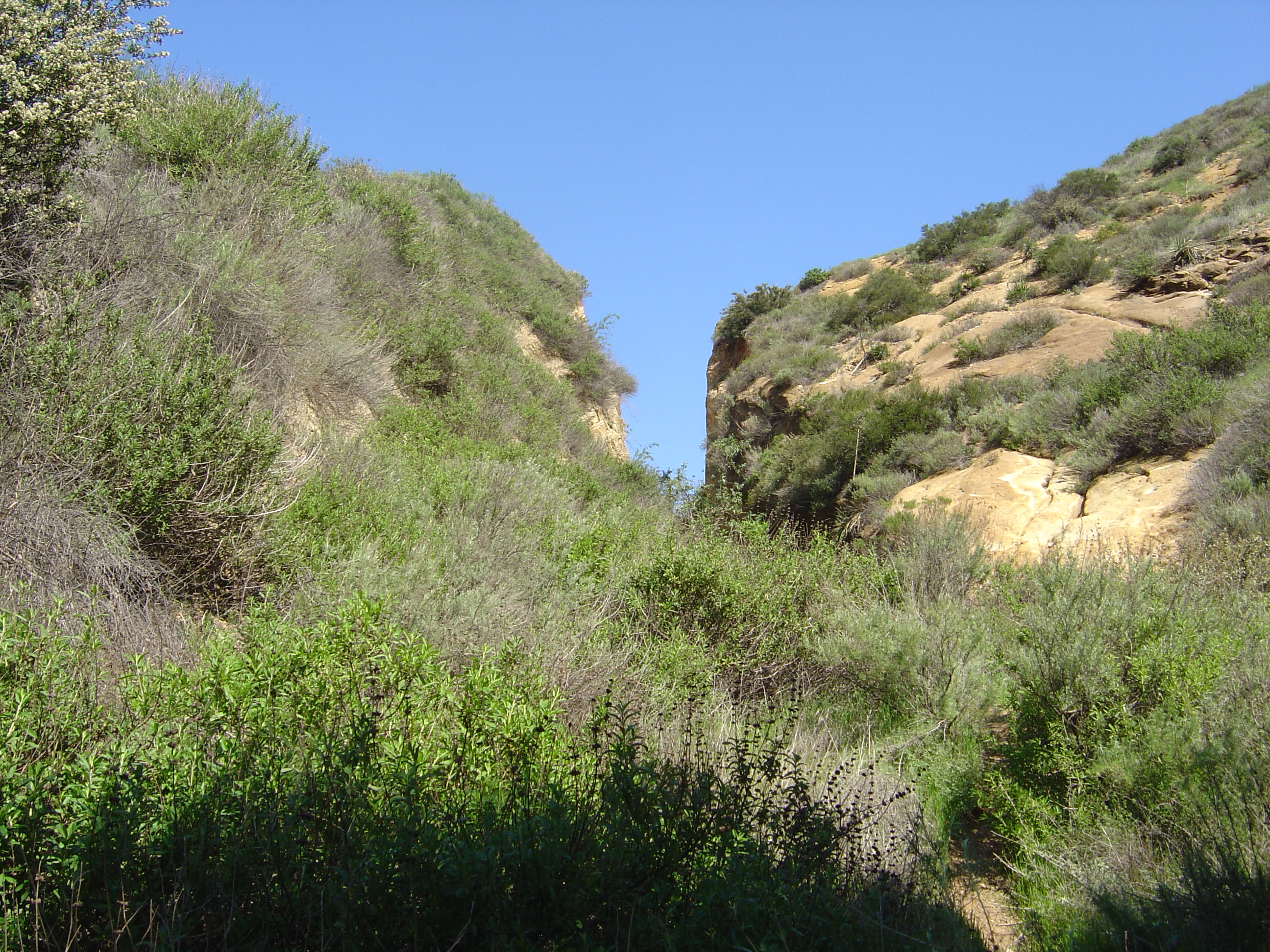
Beale's Cut in 2003.

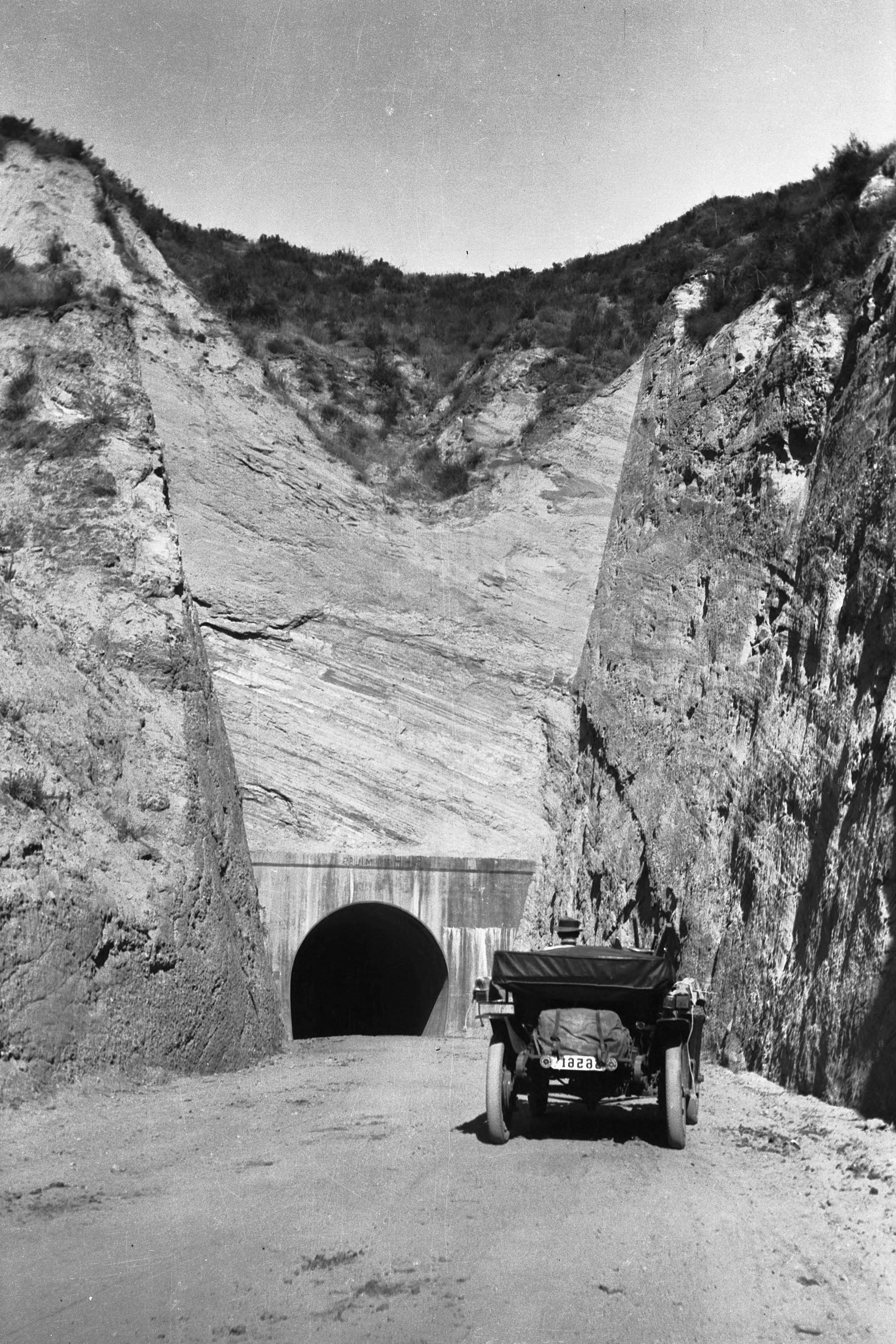
The Newhall Tunnel (c. 1918) before the hillside was removed in the 1930s.

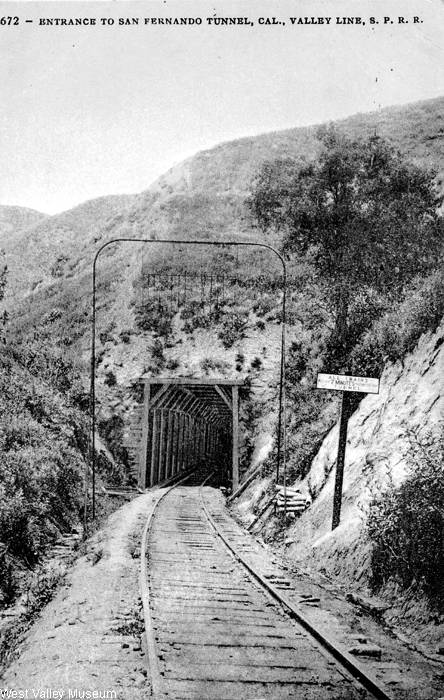
San Fernando Tunnel c. 1900.

== See also ==
- Weldon Canyon
- Ridge Route
