= Weldon Canyon =

Weldon Canyon is the name of two canyons in California.

== Los Angeles County ==
In Los Angeles County, California, United States, at 34°19′59″N 118°30′21″W, Weldon is a canyon through which Interstate 5 passes. The Old Road, now paralleled by I-5, opened on May 28, 1930, through the canyon as a bypass of the 1910 Newhall Tunnel. This original road through the canyon was 20 feet (6 m) wide and made of concrete. The canyon is named after Arthur Weldon, who helped build the Southern Pacific Railroad's nearby San Fernando Tunnel.

== Solano County ==
In Solano County, California, at 38°24′42″N 122°03′01″W, Weldon is the name sometimes given to a canyon west of Vacaville, California. Weldon canyon is mentioned in the diaries of Willis Linn Jepson. This canyon is now more commonly called Mix Canyon. Mix Canyon Road runs through it.
