= Phineas Banning =

American businessman (1830–1885)

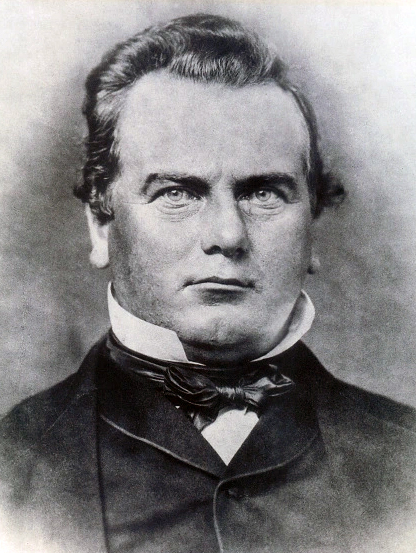
- Founder of the Port of Los Angeles
- Born: August 19, 1830; Wilmington, Delaware, US
- Died: March 8, 1885 (aged 54); San Francisco, California, US
- Occupation: Businessman
- Spouse(s): Rebecca Sanford (1856–1868) (her death); Mary Hollister (1870–1885) (his death)

Phineas Banning (August 19, 1830 – March 8, 1885) was an American businessman, financier and entrepreneur.

Known as "The Father of the Port of Los Angeles," he was one of the founders of the town of Wilmington, in Los Angeles County, California, which was named for his birthplace. His drive and ambition laid the foundations for what would become one of the busiest ports in the world.

Besides operating a freighting business, Banning operated a stage coach line between San Pedro and Wilmington, and later between Banning, California, which was named in his honor, and Yuma, Arizona.

During the Civil War, he ceded land to the Union Army to build a fort at Wilmington, the Drum Barracks. He was appointed a brigadier general of the First Brigade of the militia, and used the title of general for the rest of his life.

== Early life ==
Banning was born in Wilmington, Delaware, the seventh of 11 children to John Alford Banning (1790–1851) and Elizabeth Lowber (1792–1861). At age 13, he moved to Philadelphia to work in his oldest brother's law firm. By his late teens, Banning was working on the dockyards of Philadelphia. At the age of 20, he signed up to work a passage to a then-exotic destination – Southern California.

== California and enterprise ==
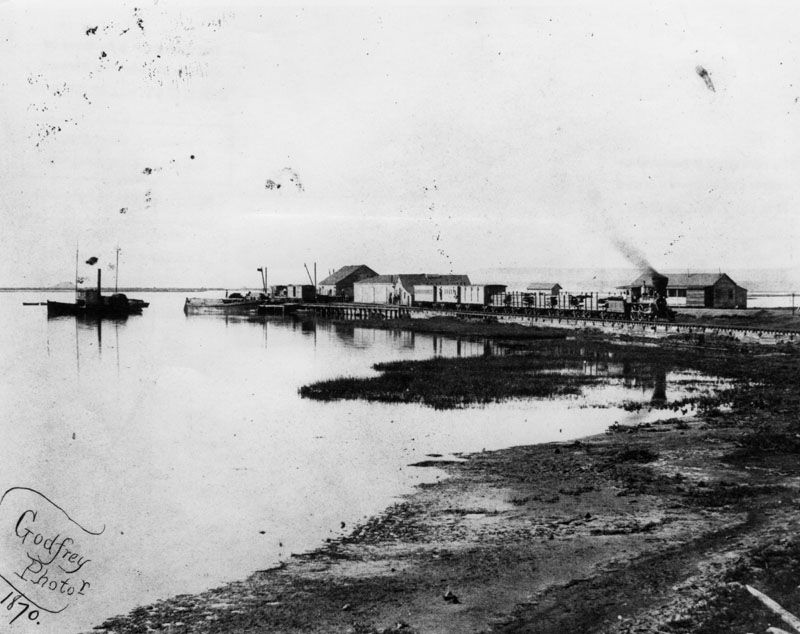
Banning's Landing, Wilmington, 1870

Banning arrived in San Pedro, California, in 1851, after a long land and sea journey that included crossing the isthmus of Panama before taking another ship to California. The 21-year-old was ambitious and worked in the fishing village of San Pedro, initially as a store clerk, and later as a stagecoach driver on the line that connected the hamlet with the pueblo of Los Angeles, a town of less than 2,000 people 20 miles (30 km) to the north.

Banning was elected to a one-year term on the Los Angeles Common Council, the governing body of that city, beginning May 10, 1858, and ending May 9, 1859.

Banning began his own staging and shipping company. By the 1860s, Banning stagecoach wagons were traveling to Salt Lake City, the Kern River gold fields, the new military installation at Yuma, Arizona, the Mormon settlement at San Bernardino, and in an arc around the Southern California region.

Banning was not content to consolidate business interests in staging. He also began expanding the harbor and docks at San Pedro from their beginnings as illegal exchange sites for mission contraband during the Spanish and Mexican eras, and made them efficient enterprises. In the late 1850s Banning and a group of Southern California investors purchased 640 acres (2.6 km2) of land adjacent to San Pedro for port expansion. The land purchase was incorporated as Wilmington, after Banning's Delaware birthplace, and his facility became known as Banning's Landing. Banning invested the profits from his trade networks into the development of a more sophisticated port complex and for the creation of roads, telegraphs, and other connections to Los Angeles. In 1859, the first ocean-going vessel anchored in Los Angeles-Wilmington harbor, and the 1860s saw the beginning of small-scale maritime trade between San Pedro and ships anchored in the deeper parts of the harbor. After government-funded dredging made a deep water harbor and breakwater a reality, the port continued to grow.

== Family life ==
In 1856, Banning married Rebecca Sanford (1837–1868), the younger sister of his first California employer. Phineas and Rebecca had eight children, of which three survived into adulthood – William Banning (1857–1946), Joseph Brent Banning (1862–1920), and Hancock Banning (1866–1925).

Family life was relatively stable in the Banning household, and Phineas was a doting, if distant father to his three boys, who grew up around the expanding docks in San Pedro. Rebecca Banning died in childbirth in 1868, and the infant, Vincent Banning, died as well.

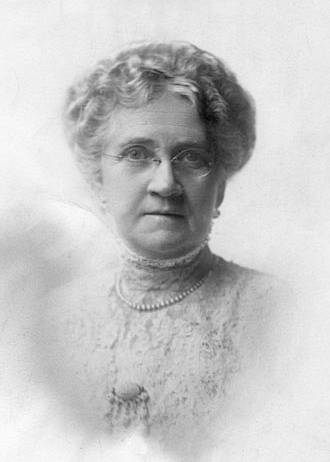
Mary E. Hollister Banning

In 1870, Banning married Mary Hollister (1846–1919), a wealthy heiress whose family lent their name to the city of Hollister, California. Phineas and Mary had three children, two of which survived to adulthood – Mary Hollister Banning (1871–1953) and Lucy Tichenor Banning (1873–1929).

== Southern California development: 1860–1880 ==
=== Civil War California ===
Following the election of Abraham Lincoln in 1860, several Southern states broke away to form the Confederate States of America, which marked the beginning of the American Civil War (1861–1865). The effects of the war were felt in California, and particularly in Los Angeles, which had many Southern sympathizers, an alarming development for the new territory. An astute businessman and a vocal patriot, Banning and fellow Californian politician Benjamin Wilson donated adjacent plots of land in Wilmington for a military base. The outpost, named Drum Barracks, or Camp Drum (1861–1871), served as headquarters for the Union's Southwestern command for the state of California and territory of Arizona. The move brought Union troops to Wilmington, further enriching Banning. He was nearly killed, along with his first wife Rebecca, when the boiler exploded on one of his packet steamers, the SS Ada Hancock, in 1863. After the end of the American Civil War in 1865, Drum Barracks was decommissioned, but the port and harbor continued to grow. Banning was an avowed Unionist and was friends with Winfield Scott Hancock when Hancock was stationed in Los Angeles. Phineas' son Hancock was named after the general.

The American government presented Banning with an honorary title, that of Brigadier General of the California First Brigade. The title was purely honorary, with no basis in military service, yet Banning insisted on being referred to as "General Banning" for the remainder of his life.

=== 1870s: Railroads, industries, and breakwaters ===
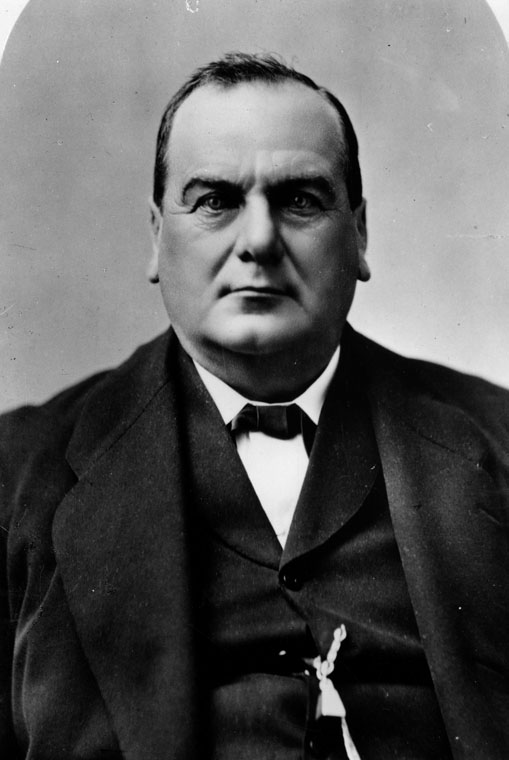
Banning in 1883

Between 1868 and 1869 he organized the construction of Southern California's first railroad, the Los Angeles & San Pedro Railroad which he sold to the Southern Pacific Railroad in 1873.

Banning spent the 1870s in a frenzy of activity. As a California state senator, he campaigned for greater transportation connections to the city of Los Angeles and the growing port, his personal project. Banning eventually pushed through a plan for a small railroad linking Wilmington/San Pedro with the main city of Los Angeles, effectively halving the time necessary for the trip, but the plan was short-lived. The Southern Pacific Railroad began building track to connect Southern California to the greater national railroad lines, and demanded much of Los Angeles' prime real estate, an enormous sum of money, and Banning's small connector line railroad in exchange for adding Los Angeles as a terminus on the railroad. Realizing that Los Angeles would wither into nothingness if the company bypassed it, the city complied and Banning surrendered his hard-earned railroad. Several personal successes marked the decade for Banning. The first breakwater was built for the nascent port in 1873, and Banning began to work for the Southern Pacific as a railroad agent.

== Final years ==
By 1880, Banning had moved to Wilmington and managed several smaller business interests.

He was in poor health for two years prior to his death, suffering from liver and kidney problems. His disease was aggravated by an accident in San Francisco, where he was knocked down and run over by an express wagon.

Banning tragically died at age 54 at the Occidental Hotel in San Francisco, after being knocked down and run over by a passing express wagon. He is interred in the Angelus-Rosedale Cemetery, Los Angeles.

== Legacy ==
Banning's legacies lived on, and his dreams were realized with the federal approval of the Port of Los Angeles in the early 20th century, and the completion of a full breakwater in 1914, creating one of the world's busiest harbors. Banning's chief residence, the Banning House, was constructed in Wilmington in 1864. It is open to the public as a museum devoted to the Victorian era in California.

== See also ==
- David W. Alexander, 19th century Los Angeles, California, politician and sheriff
- Casa Adobe De San Rafael
- List of Riverside County, California, placename etymologies#Banning
