= Beale's Cut Stagecoach Pass =

Historical landmark in Santa Clarita, California

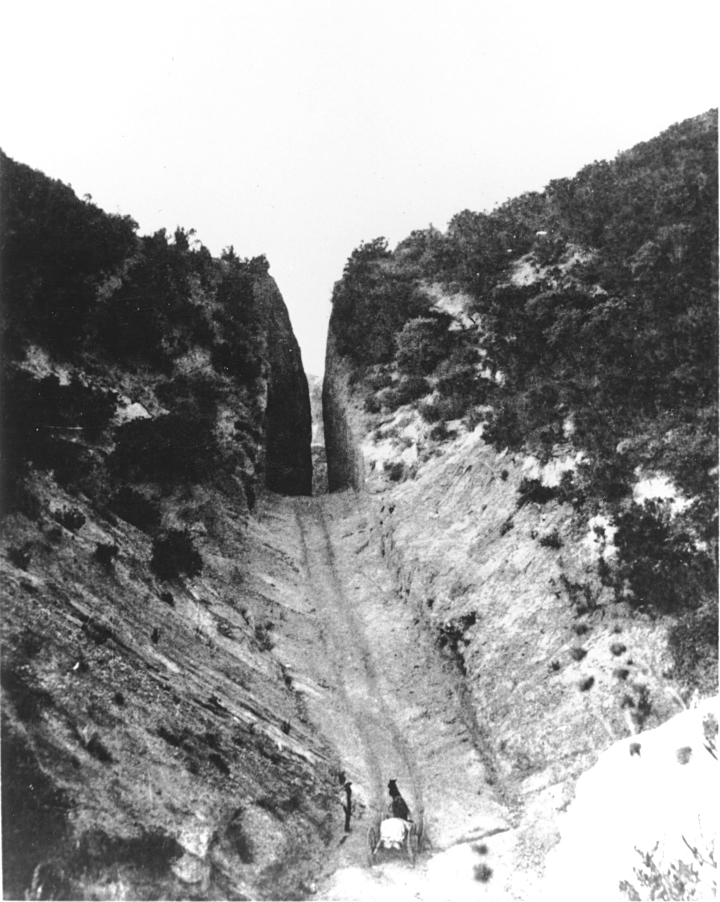
- Beale's Cut in 1872

- Location within Santa Clarita Location within the Los Angeles metropolitan area Location within California
- 34.3448°N 118.5084°W
- Location: Sierra Hwy and Clampitt Rd; Santa Clarita, CA 91321

History
- Built: 1862

California Historical Landmark
- Designated: May 11, 1992
- Reference no.: 1006

Beale's Cut Stagecoach Pass (also known as the Fremont Pass, San Fernando Pass, and the Newhall Cut) is a stagecoach pass built in 1859 in what is now Santa Clarita, California. The Pass was designated a California Historical Landmark (No. 1006) on May 11, 1992. The cut provided a route in the pass between the San Gabriel Mountains and the Santa Susana Mountains. It is near the current interchange of the Interstate 5 and California State Route 14.

The steep pass was made easier to cross with a deep slot-like road cut by Charles H. Brindley, Andrés Pico, and James R. Vineyard, to whom the State of California awarded a twenty-year contract to maintain the turnpike and collect tolls. Thus, the "San Fernando Mountain", the most daunting obstacle along the Fort Tejon Road, the main inland route from Los Angeles to the north, was cut through. Butterfield Overland Mail, a stagecoach that operated mail between St. Louis, Missouri, and San Francisco, began using it directly.

== History ==
In 1861, a landowner and surveyor named Edward Beale was appointed by President Abraham Lincoln as the federal Surveyor General of California and Nevada. Beale challenged General Andrés Pico's loyalty to the new president, and in 1863, Beale was awarded the right to collect the toll in the pass. Beale maintained rights to the cut for the next twenty years, so it became known as "Beale's Cut". Beale used Chinese immigrants to do most of the work on the cut. Work was completed in 1863, but the LA Board of Supervisors accepted it as complete on March 5, 1864.

The cut had major damage in the winter of 1861–62, and wagons could not get through the pass. In March 1862, soldiers under the command of Major Theodore Coult of the Fifth California Volunteer Infantry, repaired the cut and road. The Fifth California Volunteer Infantry headquarters were Camp Latham, California. The soldiers repaired the cut as ammunition wagons could not get to Fort Yuma, California.

Beale's Cut was eventually deepened to 90 feet (27.4 m). It lasted as a transportation passage near present-day Newhall Pass until the Newhall Tunnel opened in 1910.

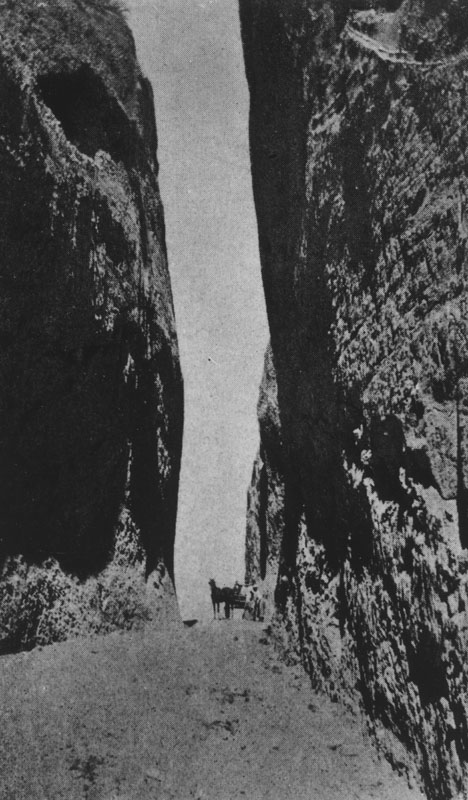
Beale's Cut Stagecoach Pass in 1870s

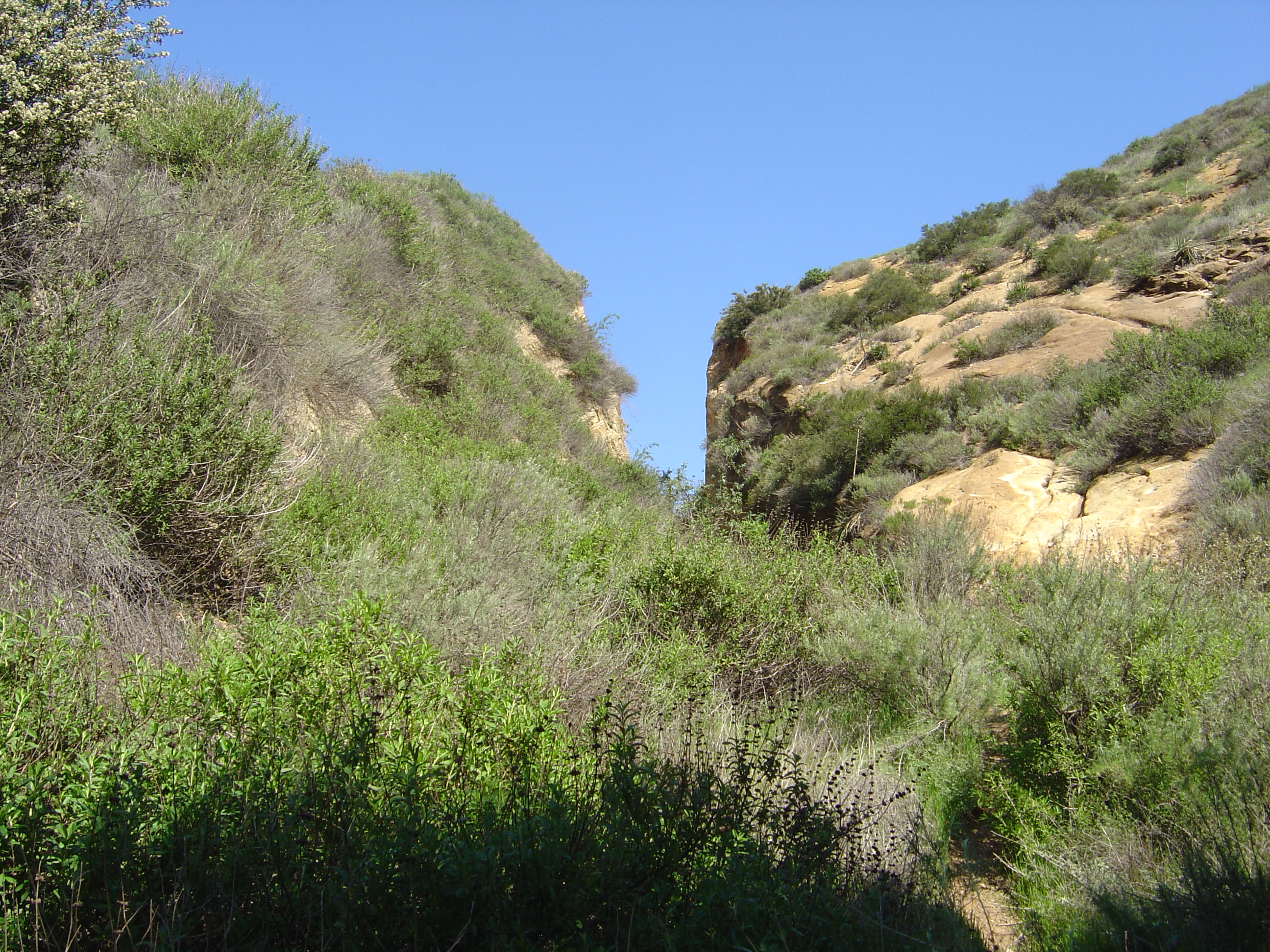
Beale's Cut in 2003

Still in existence today, it is no longer passable by automobiles. It suffered a partial collapse during the Northridge Earthquake, on January 17, 1994, and now is about 30 feet (9.1 m) deep. It can be accessed via a trailhead on Sierra Highway north of Beale’s Cut, which opened in 2026.

The pass, originally discovered in August 1769 by Catalan explorer Gaspar de Portolà, is today named for Henry Newhall, a businessman in the area during the 19th century.

In 1910, the 435-foot (133-meter) Newhall Auto Tunnel was built a quarter-mile northwest of Beale's Cut. The tunnel was 17.5 ft (5.3 m) wide, and two-way traffic through it was slow.

The California Division of Highways decided to replace the tunnel; in July 1938, work started to remove the rock above the tunnel to create a four-lane highway. The road was first known as US Highway 6, then state Highway 14, and finally the present-day Sierra Highway. The cut for the tunnel is west of today's Highway 14.

=== Films ===
Beale's Cut appeared in many silent western movies. The location became a favorite of movie producers like John Ford and D. W. Griffith. In Ford's 1923 film Three Jumps Ahead, American cowboy star Tom Mix appears to jump over the pass, although most experts believe the jump was achieved purely through special effects. John Ford used the location in at least four films over a twenty-year period beginning as early as 1917. Brief clips of the cut appear in 1932's The Devil Horse and 1939's Stagecoach.

== See also ==
- Butterfield Overland Mail
