= Alpine, Los Angeles County, California =

Unincorporated community in California, United States

Alpine
- former Unincorporated community
- Location in Los Angeles County
- Coordinates: 34°32′21″N 118°06′23″W
- Country: United States
- State: California
- County: Los Angeles
- Elevation: 2,848 ft (868 m)

Alpine, more fully Alpine Springs and also called Harold, was an unincorporated community in Los Angeles County, California, United States, located two miles south of the site of present-day Palmdale.

The Trego Post Office was located at the Alpine Station stop on the Southern Pacific Railroad, which stood at what is today the intersection of Sierra Highway and Barrel Springs Road (previously Fort Tejon Road).

The Trego post office was in operation from July 1, 1884, until December 18, 1884, when the name was changed to Harold. The first Harold post office was established on December 19, 1890, and was discontinued on September 16, 1894. A second post office named Harold was in operation from July 13, 1895, until June 15, 1901, when the papers were moved to Palmdale.

Alpine Station was mostly populated by railway employees, and Harold/Alpine dwindled as New Palmdale grew alongside it. Originally the major rail transport hub for Palmdale, Harold lost its railway depot to the latter in 1892, having shrunk at that point to a hotel-cum-saloon and a few houses. Similarly, the reservoir to the south of Palmdale, constructed in 1897 by the Antelope Valley Irrigation Company and known as the Alpine or Harold Reservoir, as well as Yuna Lake (now Lake Palmdale), lost its importance when Little Rock Creek river was dammed (by Little Rock Dam) in the 1920s, creating a reservoir with a greater capacity to serve Palmdale.

Investors hoped to revive the area's fortunes and turn it into a resort; construction was started on the Alpine Springs Hotel and Sanatorium in 1908 on the west side of Sierra Highway. However, the construction was never finished.

By 1926 only a few shacks and the Harold Square Deal Garage remained, and in the 21st century it is the site of the Alpine Springs Mobile Home Park.

In addition to the mobile home park, some vestiges of the settlement remain in local names, including streets named Harold Second, Harold Third, Harold Beech, and Harold Ash.

== Sources ==
- Gurba, Norma H. (2010). Palmdale. Arcadia Publishing. ISBN 9780738581224.
- Thompson, David G. (1929). "Antelope Valley". Water-supply Paper (PDF). U.S. Government Printing Office.
- Inland Energy Inc. (August 6, 2008). "Cultural Resources". Palmdale Hybrid Power Plant Project. California Energy Commission. 08-AFC-9. Archived from the original (PDF) on March 28, 2022.
- "Alpine". Geographic Names Information System. United States Geological Survey, United States Department of the Interior.
