= Una Lake (California) =

Sag pong on the San Andreas Fault in Palmdale, California

- Location within California
- Location: Palmdale, Los Angeles County, California
- Coordinates: 34°33′00″N 118°06′41″W
- Type: sag pond
- Surface elevation: 858 m (2,815 ft)

Una Lake is a sag pond in Palmdale, Los Angeles County, California. It is in Antelope Valley, in the San Andreas Rift Zone at an elevation of 2,815 feet/858 meters.

== History ==
Una Lake was originally much larger consisting of the current small lake and some of the eastern area of modern Lake Palmdale. The size would depend on the annual rainfall. In the 1870s, the Southern Pacific built a raised causeway for its tracks and roadway across the lake bed isolating the eastern part of the lake, now the current Una Lake. Subsequently, in 1897, the South Antelope Valley Irrigation Company built a dam west of the railroad causeway and built a ditch from Little Rock Creek to keep Una Lake full year round for irrigation purposes south of Palmdale. The size of this reservoir of Una Lake and these works can be seen on the 1915 U. S. Geological Survey, California, Lake Elizabeth Quadrangle, Topographic Map. Subsequently, the dam was improved and the larger Harold Reservoir, later Lake Palmdale, was created in 1924.
