= Lake Palmdale =

Artificial lake in Palmdale, California

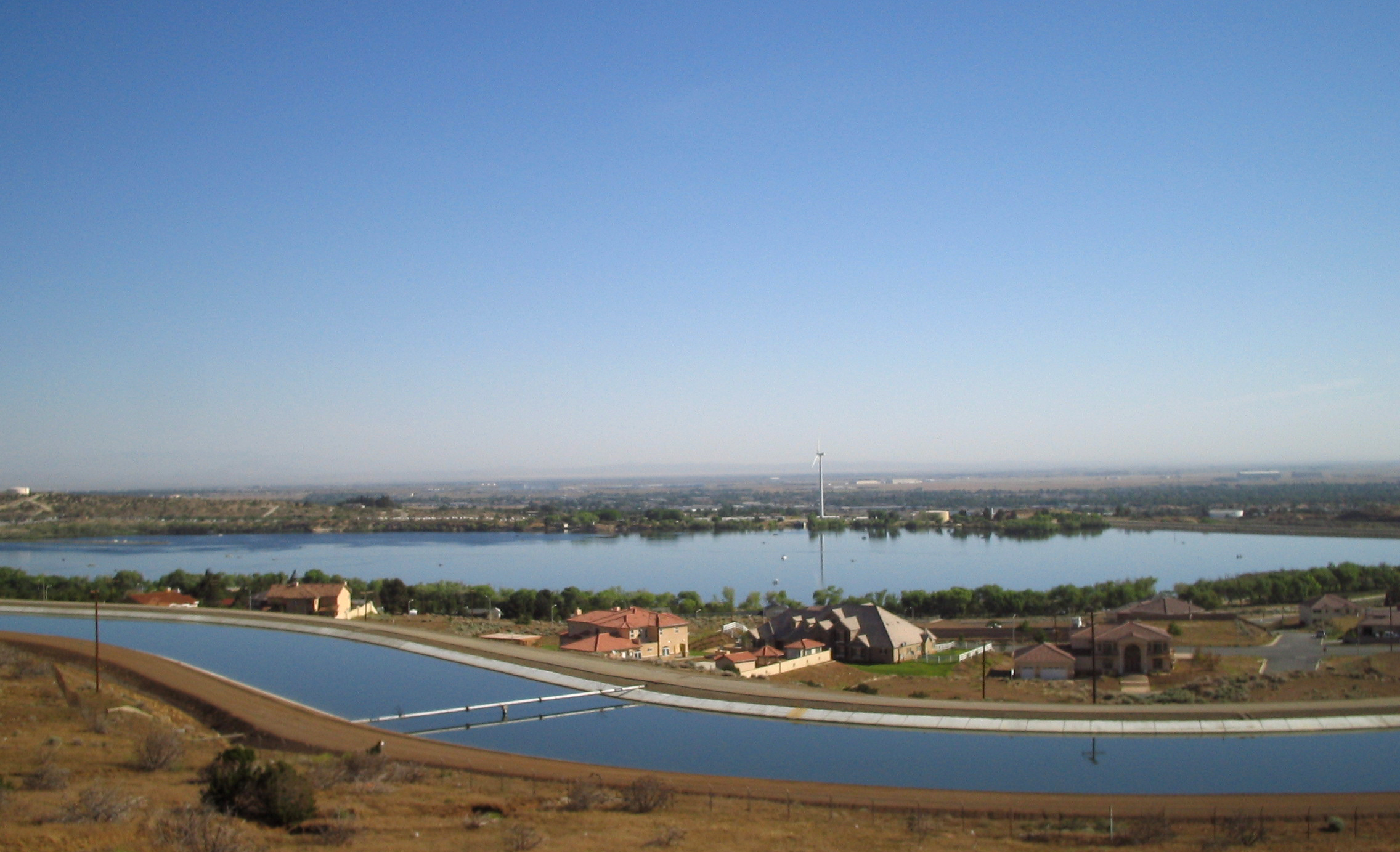
- Lake Palmdale with the California Aqueduct in the foreground.

- Location within California Location within the United States
- Location: Antelope Valley; Los Angeles County, California
- Coordinates: 34.551389°N 118.121111°W
- Type: Reservoir
- Primary inflows: California Aqueduct
- Primary outflows: Una Lake
- Basin countries: United States
- Max. length: 1.69 km (1.05 mi)
- Max. width: .87 km (0.54 mi)
- Surface area: 237.3 ha (586 acres)
- Shore length^{1}: 5.29 km (3.29 mi)
- Surface elevation: 860 m (2,820 ft)
- Islands: 2
- Settlements: Palmdale, California
- References: U.S. Geological Survey Geographic Names Information System: Lake Palmdale
- ^{1} Shore length is not a well-defined measure.

Lake Palmdale is an artificial lake completed in 1924 along with the nearby Little Rock Reservoir created by Little Rock Dam. Its source of water is the California State Water Project and it is fed by the California Aqueduct. It is located in the city of Palmdale near the city's southern edge, in the small Anaverde Valley between the San Andreas Fault and the base of Mount Tenhi.

== History ==
Formerly called Harold Reservoir or Alpine Reservoir (after the settlement of Alpine/Harold), and Yuna Lake, Lake Palmdale was completed in 1924 to aid local Antelope Valley agriculture by providing a stable and consistent water source for the local farmers. At the time of its completion, agriculture was the primary economic driver in the Palmdale area. This water source was needed due to the rain shadow desert effect that the San Gabriel Mountains have on the Antelope Valley, located in the Mojave Desert. Today the lake serves as the primary water source for the Palmdale Water District, the city's public water utility, and provides water for more than 200,000 people who live in the area. It also is used to generate electricity.

== Geography ==
Lake Palmdale is 2,918 feet (859 m) above sea level and is ringed by the hills of the San Andreas Fault and Mount Tenhi, except for a small pond on the lake's east side called Una Lake from which it is separated by the Palmdale Dam (dike) and Sierra Highway. The lake is 1.05 miles long at its greatest point (northwest to southeast), by 0.50 miles in width (southwest to northeast). Lake Palmdale has a circumference of about 2.5 miles with a surface area of about 260 acres. There is a narrow island 0.25 mi. in length at the southeast end.

== Recreation ==
Lake Palmdale is regularly stocked of fish and has a small pier-like dock that extends about .25 miles (0.4 km) into the lake from which members of the Palmdale Fin & Feather Club may use to fish from or take a small boat onto the lake. There are also many other small docks that run along the southwestern coast of the lake, also for use by the Fin & Feather Club. Use of Palmdale Lake for recreation is generally reserved for members of the Club. The nearby Littlerock Reservoir is a Los Angeles County operated park and is open to the public and can be used for boating, water skiing, fishing, and camping. The California Aqueduct is also open for fishing to the general public as long as they have a valid fishing license from the California Department of Fish and Game.

The International Game Fish Association all tackle world record 7 lb 10 oz (3.5 kg) Sacramento sucker was taken from Lake Palmdale.

== Weather ==
Lake Palmdale has very hot, dry summers, breezy springs and autumns, and frigid, highly windy winters.

Rainy weather is limited almost completely to the months between October and May. Local rain is not relied on for maintaining the water level. This is done by water flow from the California Aqueduct, which collects and transports rainwater and snowmelt from the mountains of Northern California.

The alignment of the local hills and the fault creates a sort of wind tunnel effect on the lake during the winter months. Although the lake is high elevation and winter temperatures drop frequently below freezing 32 °F (0 °C), there has been no known freezing over of the lake in its history.

== See also ==
- List of dams and reservoirs in California
- List of lakes in California
