= Mershops Antelope Valley Mall =

Shopping mall in Palmdale, California

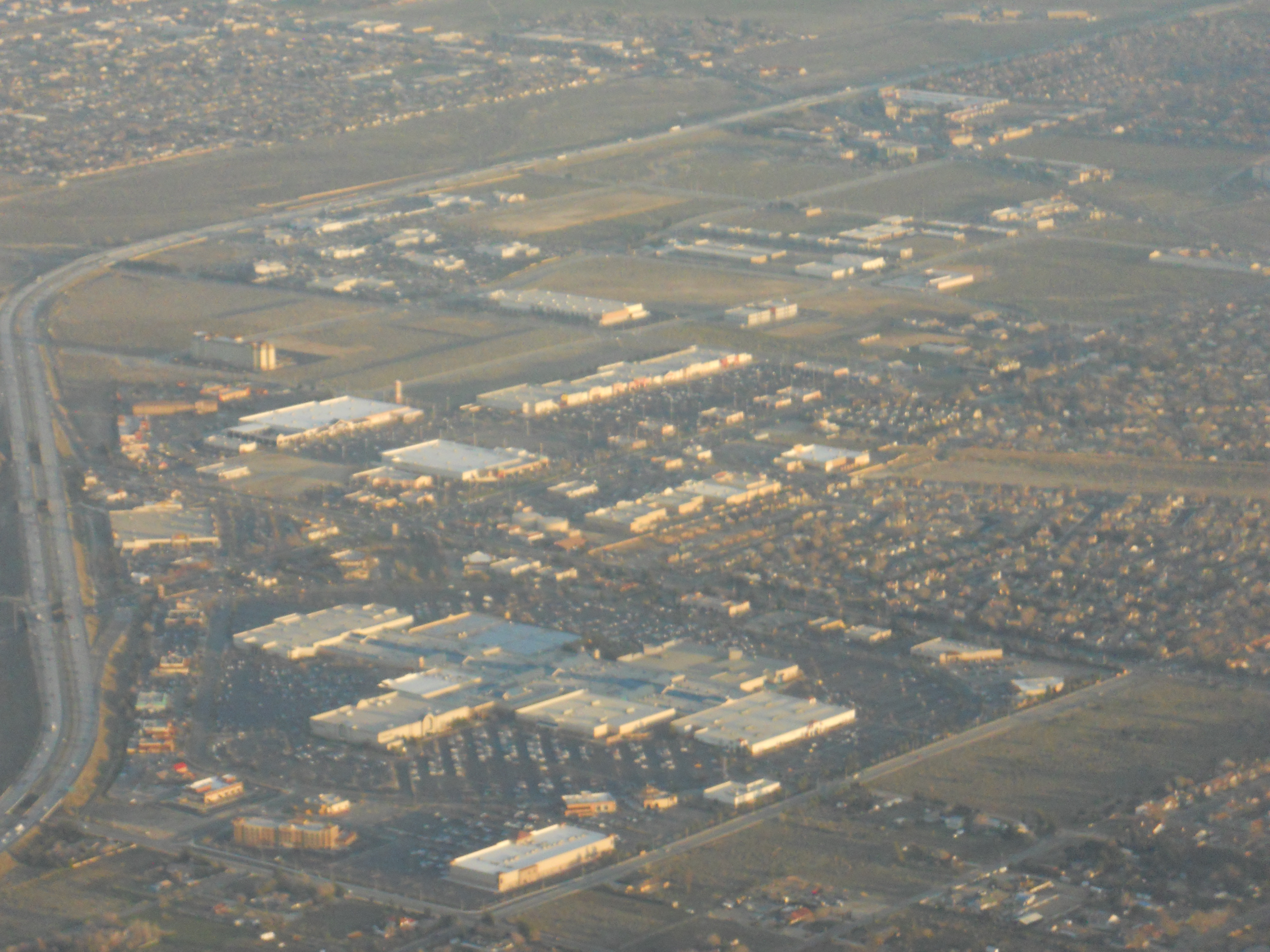
- The Mershops Antelope Valley in the foreground.
- Location: 1233 Rancho Vista Boulevard; Palmdale, California 93551
- Coordinates: 34°36′17″N 118°09′09″W
- Opened: September 24, 1990; 36 years ago
- Previous names: Antelope Valley Mall (1990 - 2025)
- Developer: Forest City Enterprises
- Manager: Spinoso Real Estate Group
- Owner: Mershops
- Num. of stores: 140
- Num. of anchor tenants: 6 (4 open, 1 vacant, 1 coming soon)
- Floor area: 1,000,000 sq ft (93,000 m^{2})
- Floors: 1 (2 in Dillard's)
- Parking: 10,000 spaces
- Website: www.av-mall.com

Mershops Antelope Valley Mall is a single-level, regional enclosed shopping mall in Palmdale, California, United States, in the Antelope Valley. It is managed by Spinoso Real Estate Group and owned by Mershops. Its buildings take up around 1 million square feet (93,000 m^{2}). Its physical main building, parking lots, and ring road businesses encompass an area a bit less than 0.5 by 0.5 miles (800 by 800 m).

The mall currently has about 140 stores, with four anchor stores: Macy's, JCPenney, Dillard's, and Dick's Sporting Goods. There is one vacant anchor, Sears, and one anchor under renovation, a former Forever 21, which is set to reopen as a Round 1 in 2026. Old Navy, H&M, and SkyZone are junior anchors. Three other anchors, Bullock's, The Broadway, and J. W. Robinson's, were planned, but never built.

== History ==
=== Construction and opening ===
Construction of the $75 million, 750,000-square-foot, Antelope Valley Mall, developed by Forest City Enterprises, began in May 1989.

Before the mall had even opened, the developers announced a planned expansion, that would have doubled the mall's size to 1.5 million square feet and added four more anchors. The new wing began construction in 1992, but on a smaller scale, with only two more anchors eventually added.

JCPenney opened a month ahead the rest of the mall on August 30, 1990, while the mall opened on September 24, 1990. Sears, Harris and Gottschalks also followed with the malls opening, while Mervyn's opened that same year.

Gottschalks bought out Harris in 1998, and its anchor store was rebranded first as Harris-Gottschalks, and later Gottschalks, leaving the mall with two Gottschalks stores.

The first Dillard's in Southern California opened in 1999 in a 2-story building.

=== 2000s and 2010s ===
In 2007, Mervyn's closed, when the chain filed for Chapter 7 Bankruptcy. Forever 21 opened in its anchor building soon after.

Both Gottschalks anchor stores closed in 2009, when the chain filed for Chapter 11 Bankruptcy. In 2010, Macy's opened in the original Gottschalks anchor.

In 2014, the second Gottschalks anchor store (originally Harris) was subdivided into multiple stores, with Dick's Sporting Goods taking the majority of the space and H&M, SkyZone, and eight other businesses, including restaurants, stores, and services in the remainder.

In 2018, it was announced that Queensland Investment Corporation had acquired the mall along with nine other malls.

In 2019, Forever 21 closed, when the chain filed for Chapter 11 Bankruptcy for its first time.

=== 2020s ===
Sears closed their anchor store on September 6, 2020, as part of a plan to close 28 stores nationwide.

In 2022, Bridge Group Investments acquired the mall for $60 million.

In August 2025, it was announced that Round 1 would open in the vacant Forever 21 anchor store. This new location would include a new YUU Japanese Food Hall concept.

Around this time, the Antelope Valley Mall was rebranded as Mershops Antelope Valley Mall, when Bridge Group Investments rebranded as Mershops, a portfolio-wide change across all of their properties.

In June 2025, it was announced that the mall would undergo a $10 million renovation, enhancing the common areas, food court, and entrances, and adding more security.
