= Dry Town Water Park =

Waterpark in Palmdale, California

- Interactive map of Dry Town Water Park
- Location: Palmdale, California, United States (United States)
- Coordinates: 34.55742°N 118.05985°W
- Owner: City of Palmdale
- Opened: 2006
- Website: Dry Town Water Park

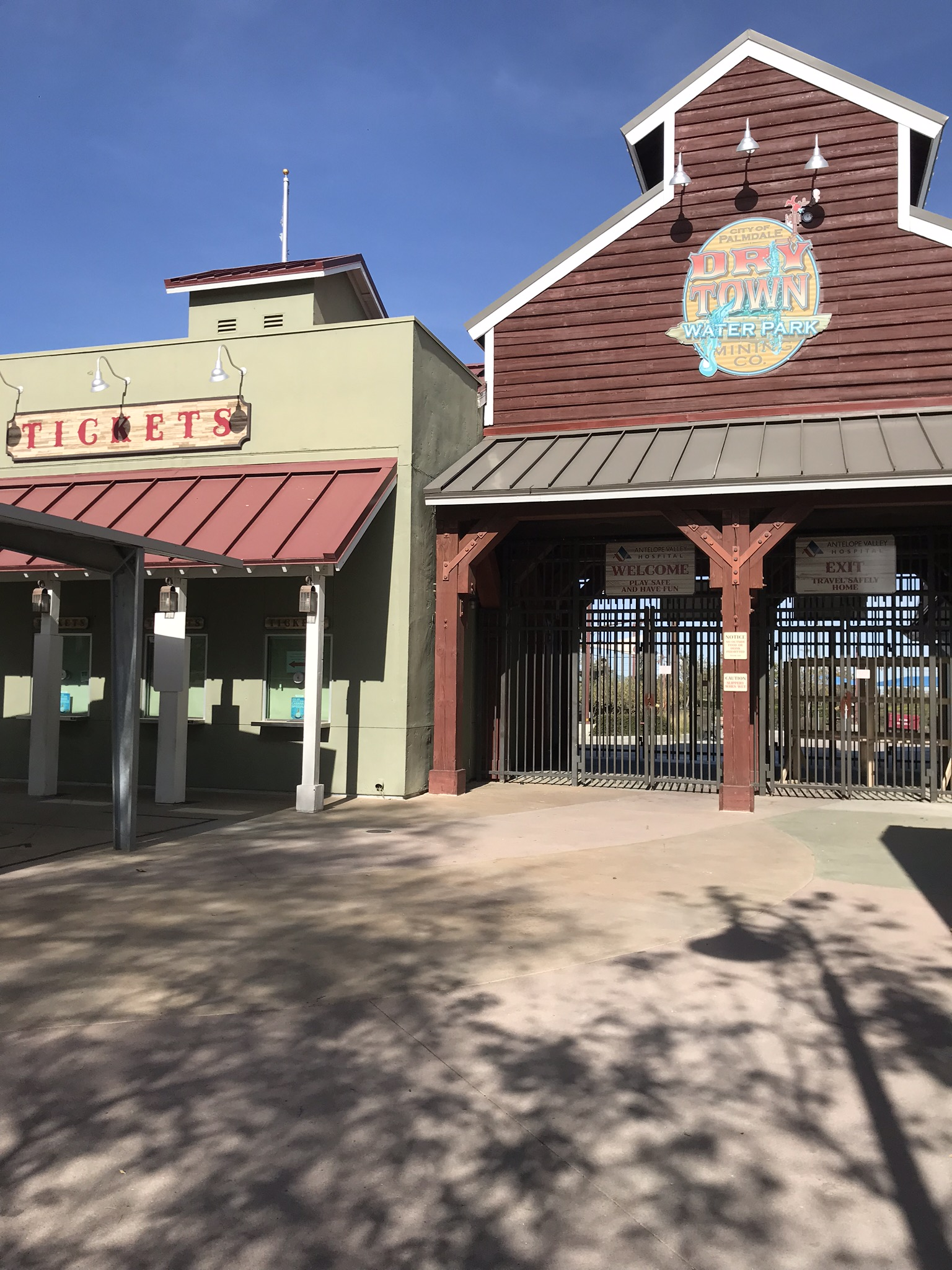
Dry Town front entrance.

Dry Town Water Park is a waterpark located in Palmdale, California that opens each year from the Memorial Day weekend in May through Labor Day in September.

== Location and operating hours ==
Dry Town Water Park first opened in 2006 and is operated by the city of Palmdale, California. It is located at 3850 East Avenue S, on the grounds of the Palmdale Oasis Park & Recreation Center in the southeast portion of the city.

The park is open each year from the Memorial Day weekend in May through Labor Day in September. Normal operating hours are from 11am to 6pm but has different operating hours during special event days:

The City of Palmdale canceled Dry Town Water Park's 2020 season due to COVID-19 pandemic restrictions and will reopen in 2021 for its 15th Anniversary Season.

== Attractions ==
The six-acre park features four main attractions:

1. Tower A: a 35-foot tower structure that holds three waterslides with a three foot deep splashdown pool
2. Tower B: A second tower structure that holds a four-lane racer slide
3. Little Miner's Camp: A 6,000 square foot children's water playground with three slides, spray features, and a giant overhead splash bucket
4. The Lazy River: A 925-foot lazy river that winds around the center of the park

=== Tower A ===
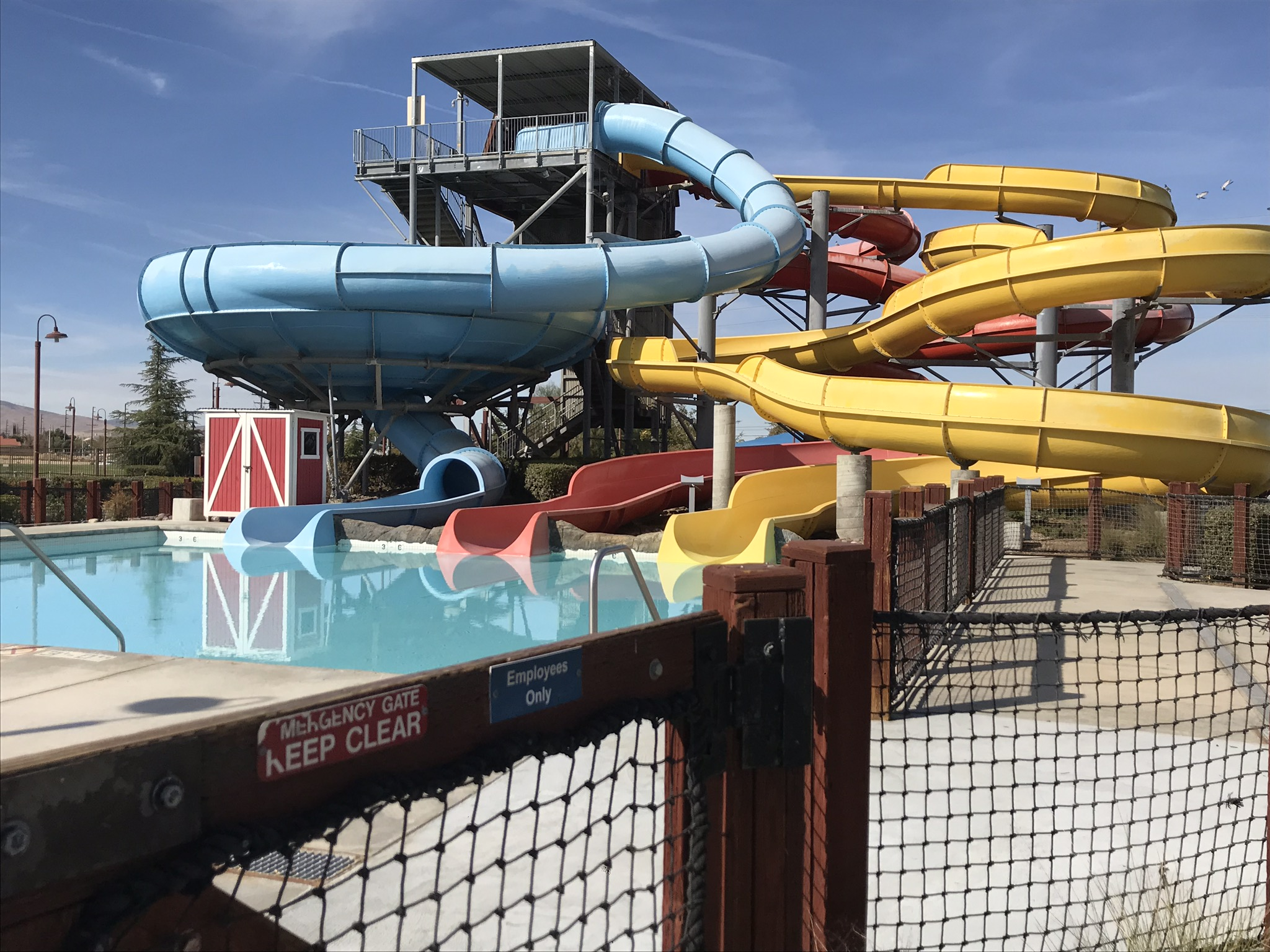
Rattler's Revenge, The Wildcatter, The Devil's Punchbowl.

The tower features three slides that are individually colored and named. According to the Park Policy, guests must meet height and weight requirements and use a rider tube to enjoy these three slides.

The tower's first slide, Rattler's Revenge, also known as the “red slide” to locals, is a half-covered half-open slide. Riders are plunged through darkness through an enclosed flume for the duration of a 360-degree turn until exposed to bright sunlight.

The tower's second slide, The Wildcatter or the “yellow slide”, is the only slide of the three that is entirely open. Riders are propelled down this open flume slide with two 360 degree turns until they reach the splash pool below.

The tower's third slide, the Devil's Punch Bowl or the “blue slide”, is a giant bowl slide where riders drop into and swirl around before finally entering another drop into the catch pool.

=== Tower B ===
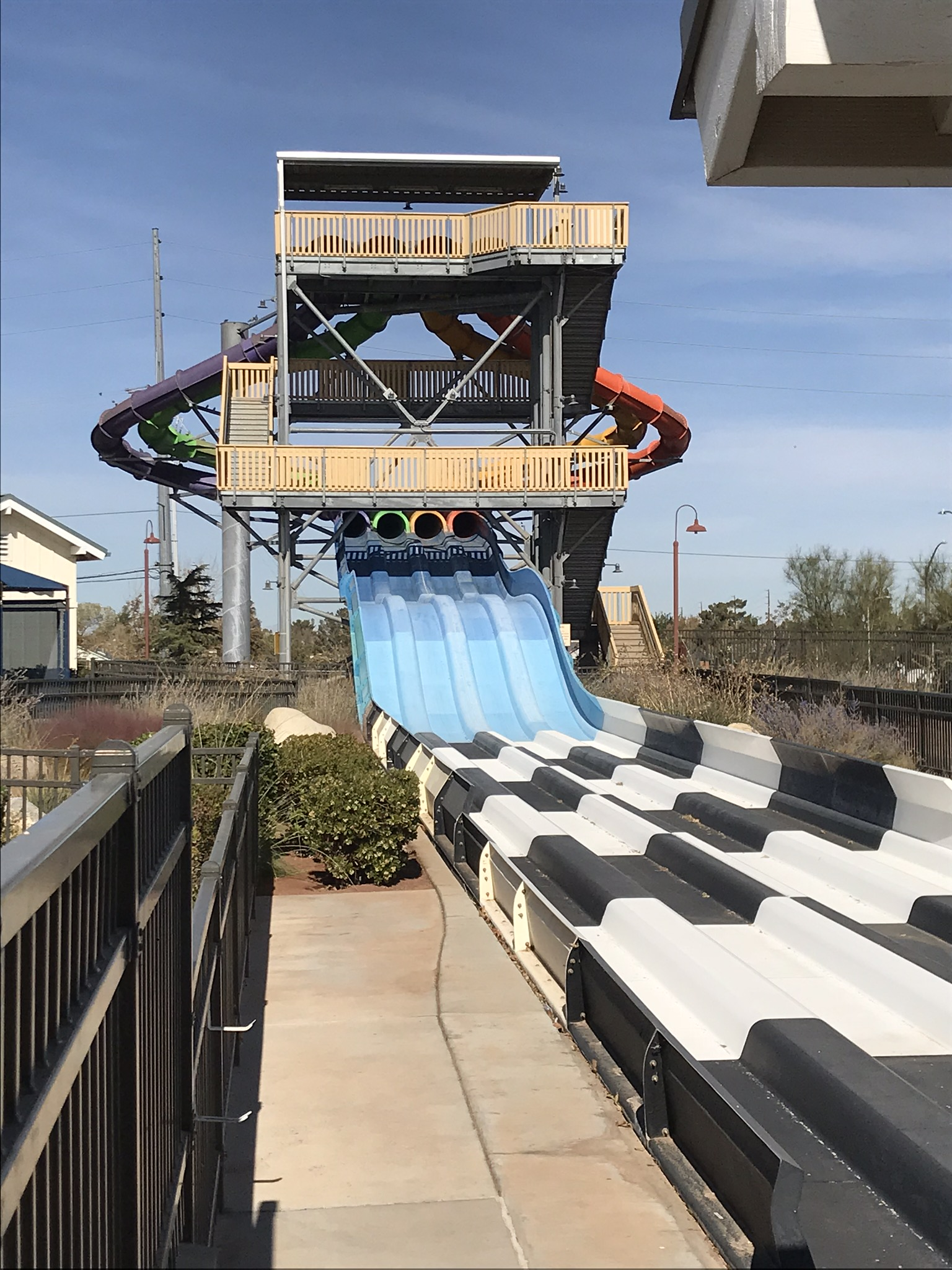
Dusty's Mine Shaft Racer.

The second tower was not part of the original opening of the park in 2006. Dusty's Mine Shaft Racer, the main attraction of this tower, encountered problems during its 2011 summer season debut but became fully operational starting the 2012 summer season.

On the Dusty's Mine Shaft Racer, up to four riders go head-to-head on a high-speed race, sliding headfirst down their designated slide. Riders encounter a 360 degree turn in an enclosed tube before plunging 40 feet down open-air lanes for a downhill dash to the finish.

=== Little Miner's Camp ===
Little Miner's Camp is a 6,000 square foot children's water playground area with three slides, spray features, and a giant overhead splash bucket. The splash bucket holds 50 gallons of water and drops the water on guests periodically when filled. The camp also features three water rings, two water cannons, water shooters, and buckets.

=== The Lazy River ===
The Big Rock River, also known as The Lazy River, is a 925-foot lazy river that contains three main entrances and exits. Attendees can either swim or use first-come, first-served free inflatable tubes to float around the lazy river.

== Operations ==
Dry Town Water Park's water is heated to 80 °F. Because Dry Town Water Park is located in the high desert in Palmdale, California, the heated water is still relatively cool compared to the outdoor weather. The hot season in Palmdale coincides with the operating days of Dry Town Water Park, with an average daily high temperature above 88 °F and hotter days in August with an average high of 96 °F.

As opposed to typical heat and heat waves, Dry Town Water Park is also susceptible to stormy weather, high winds, and surrounding fires. If lightning is present, the park is closed immediately and all attendees are asked to exit and leave the park as soon as possible. Although the park may not close due to high winds, certain areas and attractions may be shut off for the time being in order to avoid park damage or injury to staff members and attendees. Depending on the severity of the smoke, the park may close due to bad air quality.

== Lifeguard team recognition ==
The City of Palmdale's lifeguard team at Dry Town Water Park is evaluated two times per summer season by the National Aquatic Safety Company (NASCO). NASCO performs inspections at hundreds of water park facilities throughout the United States each year and is recognized as a leader and innovator in the safety procedures for aquatics and amusement park facilities. A representative from the company evaluates the lifeguards' scanning time (how quickly and accurately the water surface is viewed), appearance (indicates that the lifeguard is prepared with proper equipment), posture (rescue ready stance) and proper dispatching of the water slides and gives a numeric score between 0 and 100. A score of 75 or higher is considered a "world class score" nationwide while a score below 40 follows an immediate closure of the park.

As of 2018, the lifeguard team received a "world class" score upon inspection from the NASCO for the 17th consecutive time. In 2012, the lifeguard team was recognized by the City of Palmdale for attaining a perfect score of 100.
