= List of largest cities on the United States West Coast =

This list of the largest cities on the United States West Coast includes the largest cities by population within the West Coast states of Alaska, Washington, Oregon, and California. Historically, the largest population hubs along the West Coast have been centered along the coastal regions and port cities such as Los Angeles, San Francisco, Seattle, Portland, San Diego, and Anchorage. The majority of the West Coast's largest cities are located within the state of California, with Los Angeles being the largest.

== Cities ==
†	County seat

2017 Rank	city	state	County / borough	Population (2017 est.)	Metro	Notes
1	Los Angeles †	California	Los Angeles	3,999,759	13,131,431	Largest city in California
2	San Diego †	California	San Diego	1,419,516	3,317,749	
3	San Jose †	California	Santa Clara	1,035,317	1,998,463	Located within the San Francisco Bay Area
4	San Francisco †	California	San Francisco	884,363	4,727,357	
5	Seattle †	Washington (state)	King County	724,745	3,733,580	Largest city in Washington
6	Portland †	Oregon	Multnomah	647,805	2,389,228	Largest city in Oregon
7	Fresno †	California	Fresno	527,438	972,297	
8	Sacramento †	California	Sacramento	501,901	2,149,127	
9	Long Beach	California	Los Angeles	469,450	13,131,431	Located within the Los Angeles metropolitan area
10	Oakland †	California	Alameda	425,195	—N/a	Located within the San Francisco Bay Area
11	Bakersfield †	California	Kern	380,874	839,631	
12	Anaheim	California	Orange	352,497	—N/a	Located within the Los Angeles metropolitan area
13	Santa Ana †	California	Orange	334,136	—N/a	Located within the Los Angeles metropolitan area
14	Riverside †	California	Riverside	327,728	—N/a	
15	Stockton †	California	San Joaquin	310,496	726,126	
16	Anchorage †	Alaska	Anchorage	294,356	401,635	Largest city in Alaska
17	Irvine	California	Orange	277,453	—N/a	Located within the Los Angeles metropolitan area
18	Chula Vista	California	San Diego	270,471	—N/a	Located within San Diego metropolitan area
19	Fremont	California	Alameda	234,962	—N/a	Located within the San Francisco Bay Area
20	Spokane †	Washington	Spokane	217,300	556,634	
21	San Bernardino †	California	San Bernardino	216,995	4,224,851	
22	Modesto †	California	Stanislaus	547,899	—N/a	
23	Tacoma †	Washington	Pierce	213,418	3,733,580	
24	Fontana	California	San Bernardino	211,815	—N/a	
25	Santa Clarita	California	Los Angeles	210,888	13,155,788	
26	Oxnard	California	Ventura	210,037	—N/a	
27	Moreno Valley	California	Riverside	207,226	—N/a	
28	Glendale	California	Los Angeles	203,054	—N/a	
29	Huntington Beach	California	Orange	201,874	—N/a	
30	Rancho Cucamonga	California	San Bernardino	177,452	—N/a	
31	Oceanside	California	San Diego	176,193	—N/a	
32	Ontario	California	San Bernardino	216,995	—N/a	
33	Vancouver †	Washington	Clark	176,400	2,389,228	Located within Portland metropolitan area
34	Santa Rosa †	California	Sonoma	175,269	—N/a	
35	Garden Grove	California	Orange	174,226	—N/a	Located within Los Angeles metropolitan area
36	Elk Grove	California	Sacramento	171,844	—N/a	Located within Sacramento metropolitan area
37	Salem †	Oregon	Marion	169,798	400,408	Capital city of Oregon
38	Eugene †	Oregon	Lane	168,916	369,519	
39	Corona	California	Riverside	167,836	4,224,851	Located within Riverside metropolitan area
40	Hayward	California	Alameda	160,500	7,468,390	Located within San Francisco Bay Area
41	Lancaster	California	Los Angeles	160,316	—N/a	
42	Salinas †	California	Monterey	157,596	—N/a	
43	Palmdale	California	Los Angeles	157,519	12,828,837	Charter city
44	Sunnyvale	California	Santa Clara	153,656		Located within San Francisco Bay Area
45	Pomona	California	Los Angeles	152,939		
46	Escondido	California	San Diego	151,969		
47	Torrance	California	Los Angeles	146,758	—N/a	Located within Los Angeles Metropolitan area
48	Bellevue	Washington	King	144,444	3,733,580	Located within Seattle metropolitan area
49	Pasadena	California	Los Angeles	142,647	—N/a	Located within Los Angeles metropolitan area
50	Orange	California	Orange	140,560	—N/a	
51	Fullerton	California	Orange	140,392	—N/a	
52	Roseville	California	Placer	135,329	—N/a	Located within Sacramento metropolitan area
53	Visalia †	California	Tulare	133,010	—N/a	Located within San Joaquin Valley
54	Concord	California	Contra Costa	129,783	—N/a	Located within San Francisco Bay Area
55	Thousand Oaks	California	Ventura	128,995	—N/a	Located within Los Angeles metropolitan area
56	Kent	Washington	King	128,458	—N/a	Located within Seattle metropolitan area
57	Santa Clara	California	Santa Clara	127,134	—N/a	Located within San Francisco Bay Area
58	Simi Valley	California	Ventura	126,878	—N/a	Located within Greater Los Angeles
59	Victorville	California	San Bernardino	122,441	—N/a	
60	Berkeley	California	Alameda	122,324	—N/a	Located within San Francisco Bay Area
61	Vallejo	California	Solano	122,105	—N/a	Located within San Francisco Bay Area
62	Fairfield †	California	Solano	116,266	—N/a	Located within San Francisco Bay Area
63	El Monte	California	Los Angeles	116,109	—N/a	
64	Carlsbad	California	San Diego	115,330	—N/a	Located within San Diego metropolitan area
65	Temecula	California	Riverside	114,327	—N/a	
66	Costa Mesa	California	Orange	113,825	—N/a	
67	Murrieta	California	Riverside	113,326	—N/a	
68	Downey	California	Los Angeles	113,092	—N/a	
69	Antioch	California	Contra Costa	111,674	—N/a	
70	Gresham	Oregon	Multnomah	111,053	2,314,554	Located within Portland metropolitan area
71	Ventura	California	Ventura	110,790	—N/a	Officially the City of San Buenaventura
72	Inglewood	California	Los Angeles	110,598	—N/a	Located within Los Angeles metropolitan area
73	Everett †	Washington	Snohomish	110,079	3,733,580	Located within Seattle metropolitan area
74	Richmond	California	Contra Costa	110,040	—N/a	Located within San Francisco Bay Area
75	Clovis	California	Fresno	109,691	—N/a	
76	West Covina	California	Los Angeles	107,598	—N/a	Located within Greater Los Angeles
77	Daly City	California	San Mateo	107,074	—N/a	
78	Santa Maria	California	Santa Barbara	107,014	—N/a	
79	Hillsboro †	Oregon	Washington	106,894	—N/a	Located within Portland metropolitan area
80	Norwalk	California	Los Angeles	106,084	—N/a	Located within Greater Los Angeles
81	Jurupa Valley	California	Riverside	106,028	—N/a	
82	Burbank	California	Los Angeles	104,834	—N/a	Located within Los Angeles metropolitan area
83	San Mateo	California	San Mateo	104,748	—N/a	
84	El Cajon	California	San Diego	103,894	—N/a	
85	Rialto	California	San Bernardino	103,562	—N/a	
86	Vista	California	San Diego	101,568	—N/a	Located within San Diego metropolitan area
87	Renton	Washington	King	101,379	—N/a	Located within Seattle metropolitan area
88	Vacaville	California	Solano	100,032	—N/a	
89	Compton	California	Los Angeles	97,612	—N/a	Located within Los Angeles metropolitan area
90	Spokane Valley	Washington	Spokane	97,847	547,924	Located within Spokane metropolitan area
91	Beaverton	Oregon	Washington	97,514	—N/a	Located within Portland metropolitan area
92	Federal Way	Washington	King	96,690	—N/a	Located within Seattle metropolitan area
93	San Marcos	California	San Diego	96,198	—N/a	
94	Mission Viejo	California	Orange	96,016	—N/a	
95	South Gate	California	Los Angeles	95,430	—N/a	
96	Hesperia	California	San Bernardino	94,859	—N/a	
97	Bend †	Oregon	Deschutes	94,520	—N/a	
98	Yakima †	Washington	Yakima	93,667	—N/a	
99	Chico	California	Butte	93,293	—N/a	
100	Carson	California	Los Angeles	92,735	—N/a	
101	Santa Monica	California	Los Angeles	92,306	—N/a	
102	Santa Barbara †	California	Santa Barbara	92,101	—N/a	
103	Redding †	California	Shasta	91,794	—N/a	
104	Westminster	California	Orange	91,564	—N/a	
105	Tracy	California	San Joaquin	90,889	—N/a	
106	San Leandro	California	Alameda	90,553	—N/a	Located within San Francisco Bay Area
107	Livermore	California	Alameda	90,295	—N/a	Located within San Francisco Bay Area
108	Indio	California	Riverside	89,793	—N/a	
109	Bellingham †	Washington	Whatcom	89,045	221,404	
110	Kirkland	Washington	King	88,630	—N/a	Located within Seattle metropolitan area
