= List of cities in the Mojave Desert =

Incorporated settlements in the Mojave Desert
Name	State	UTC	Type	Population (2010 census)	Population (2020 census)
Adelanto	California	UTC−8	City	31,765	38,046
Apple Valley	California	UTC−8	City	69,135	75,791
Barstow	California	UTC−8	City	22,639	25,415
Boulder City	Nevada	UTC−8	City	15,023	14,885
Bullhead City	Arizona	UTC−7	City	39,540	41,348
California City	California	UTC−8	City	14,120	14,973
Henderson	Nevada	UTC−8	City	257,729	317,610
Hesperia	California	UTC−8	City	90,173	99,818
Hurricane	Utah	UTC−7	City	13,748	20,036
Ivins	Utah	UTC−7	City	6,753	8,978
Kingman	Arizona	UTC−7	City	28,068	32,689
Lake Havasu City	Arizona	UTC−7	City	52,527	57,144
Lancaster	California	UTC−8	City	156,633	173,516
Las Vegas	Nevada	UTC−8	City	583,756	641,903
La Verkin	Utah	UTC−7	City	4,060	4,354
Leeds	Utah	UTC−7	Town	820	864
Mesquite	Nevada	UTC−8	City	15,276	20,471
Needles	California	UTC−8	City	4,844	4,931
North Las Vegas	Nevada	UTC−8	City	216,961	262,527
Palmdale	California	UTC−8	City	152,750	169,450
Ridgecrest	California	UTC−8	City	27,616	27,959
Santa Clara	Utah	UTC−7	City	6,003	7,553
St. George	Utah	UTC−7	City	72,897	95,342
Tehachapi	California	UTC−8	City	14,414	12,939
Twentynine Palms	California	UTC−8	City	25,048	28,065
Victorville	California	UTC−8	City	115,903	134,810
Washington	Utah	UTC−7	City	18,761	27,993
Yucca Valley	California	UTC−8	Town	20,700	21,738
