= Little Rock Creek (Los Angeles County, California) =

Stream in California, US

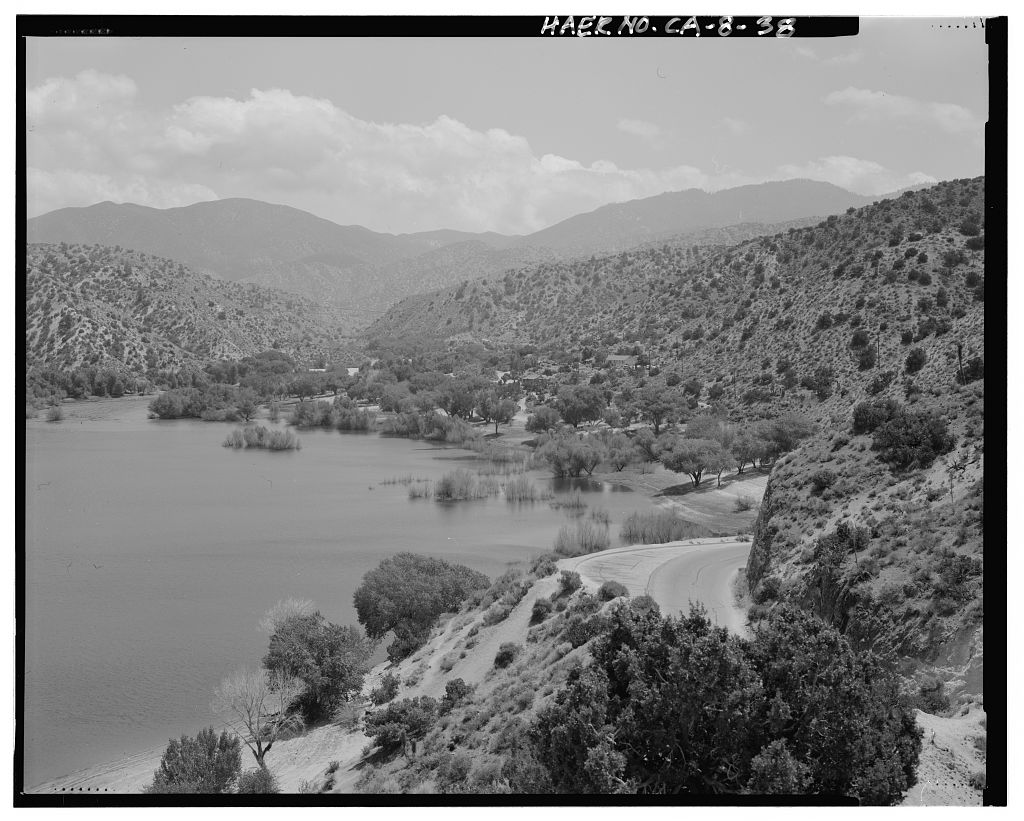
- View to south over reservoir into Little Rock Creek Watershed

Location
- Country: United States
- State: California
- Region: Los Angeles County
- Cities: Littlerock, Palmdale

Physical characteristics
- Source: Mount Williamson
  - location: San Gabriel Mountains
  - coordinates: 34°22′16″N 117°51′35″W
  - elevation: 8,000 ft (2,400 m)
- Mouth: Little Rock Reservoir
  - coordinates: 34°28′09″N 118°01′11″W
  - elevation: 3,268 ft (996 m)

Basin features
- Tributaries
  - left: South Fork Little Rock Creek, Santiago Canyon Creek

Little Rock Creek is a 16.7-mile (26.9 km) northwestward-flowing stream in the San Gabriel Mountains and Mojave Desert, within northern Los Angeles County, California.

Its headwaters are in the Angeles National Forest, just west of Mount Williamson peak. Downstream the creek enters Little Rock Reservoir, impounded by Little Rock Dam. After released there it flows through Little Rock Wash into the Antelope Valley of the western Mojave Desert.

The California Office of Environmental Health Hazard Assessment has issued a safe eating advisory for any fish caught in Little Rock Reservoir due to elevated levels of mercury and PCBs.

== History ==
According to the toponomastic scholar, Erwin Gudde, "little" often refers to a place name when it is near to a larger geographic feature, in this case Little Rock Creek being close to Big Rock Creek

The fifth Pacific Railroad Survey led by Lt. Robert Stockton Williamson and Colonel John Parke visited Little Rock Creek in 1853, as they surveyed the north slope of the San Gabriel Mountains. The first non-native settlement in the area was Santiago García, who was born circa 1833. He built an adobe on the north side of Little Rock Creek approximately 0.5 miles (0.80 km) to the east of where the creek turned from north to east near Totem Pole Ranch. At this wet spot, where the San Andreas Fault system forced water to the surface, the Garcia cienaga (canyon) was located. Santiago Garcia was killed in 1873 by a grizzly bear in what was later named Santiago Canyon.

== Watershed and Course ==
Little Rock Creek's originates just west of the summit of 8,199 feet (2,499 m) Mount Williamson and flows down the north slope of the San Gabriel Mountains. Its main tributaries are South Fork Little Rock Creek and then Santiago Canyon Creek just before reaching Little Rock Reservoir. At Little Rock Dam it becomes Little Rock Wash which terminates in the Antelope Valley. Little Rock Creek is part of the Antelope Valley Watershed, which is a closed endorheic basin with no outlet. It is part of the South Lahontan Hydrologic Region.

== Ecology ==
Lower Little Rock Creek is home to the endangered arroyo toad (Anaxyrus californicus), a factor leading to the closure of Little Rock Road and the forested areas upstream from the reservoir. The upper segment of the creek is located in the newly designated Pleasant View Ridge Wilderness area and supports an important population of endangered mountain yellow-legged frog (Rana muscosa).

The Little Rock Creek watershed was protected by the October, 2014 designation of the San Gabriel Mountains National Monument.

== See also ==
- List of rivers of California
