= Little Rock Dam =

Dam near Palmdale, California, US

Littlerock Dam
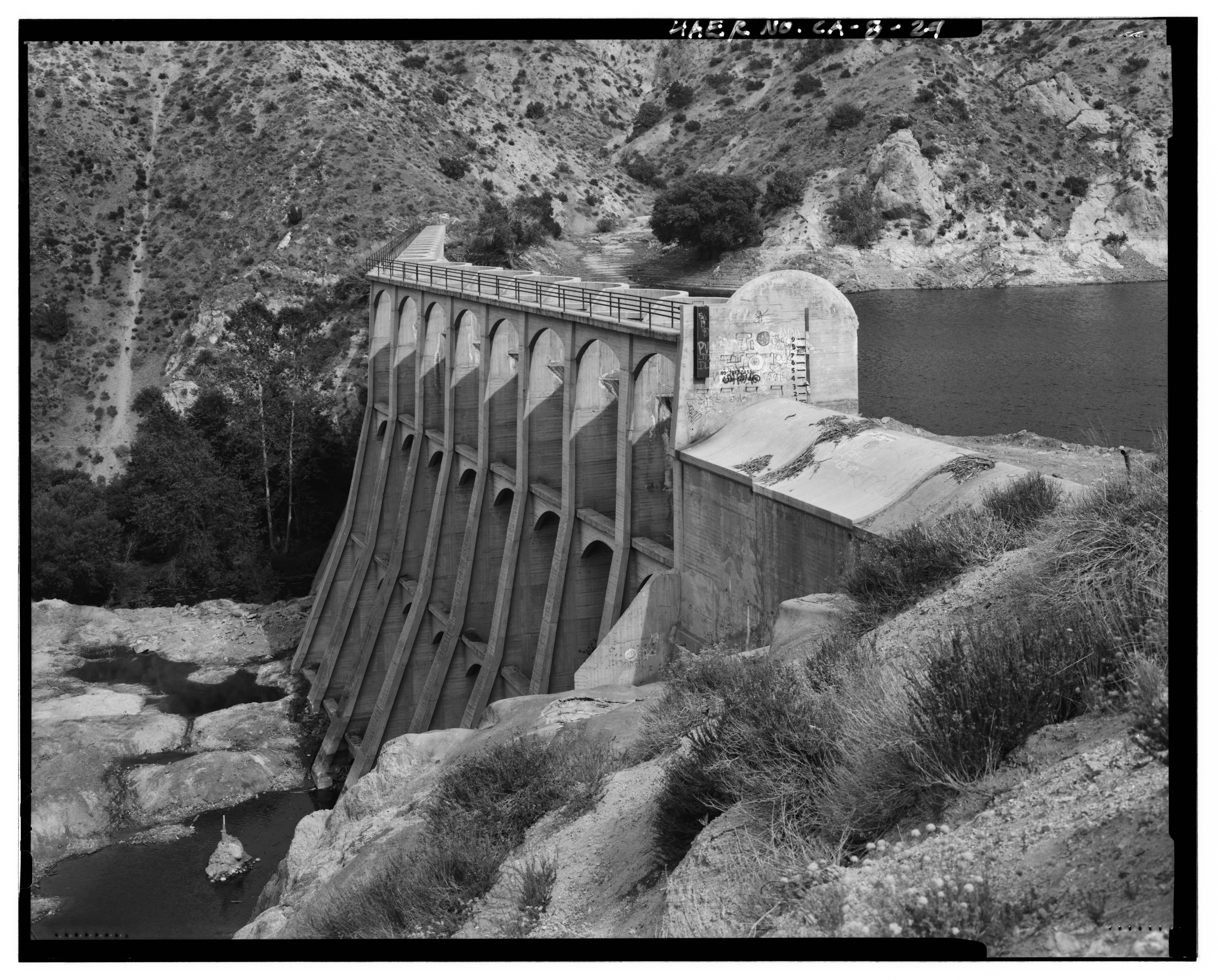
- West end of dam, looking southeast

- Location of the dam in California
- Official name: Littlerock-Palmdale Dam
- Location: California, United States
- Coordinates: 34°29′09″N 118°01′19″W
- Opening date: 1924; 102 years ago
- Owners: Palmdale Water District; Littlerock Creek Irrigation District

Dam and spillways
- Type of dam: Concrete gravity
- Impounds: Little Rock Creek
- Height: 124 ft (38 m)
- Length: 576 ft (176 m)

Reservoir
- Creates: Little Rock Reservoir
- Total capacity: 3,700 acre⋅ft (4,600,000 m^{3})
- Catchment area: 63.7 mi^{2} (165 km^{2})

Little Rock Dam, also known as Littlerock Dam, or officially as Little Rock-Palmdale Dam, is a concrete gravity dam on Little Rock Creek in Los Angeles County, California, about 5 mi (8.0 km) south of Palmdale. The dam and Little Rock Reservoir are owned by the Palmdale Water District and Littlerock Creek Irrigation District and are used for agricultural and municipal water supply and flood control.

The dam is 124 ft (38 m) high from foundation to crest and spans 576 ft (176 m) across the canyon, forming a reservoir with a capacity of 3,700 acre⋅ft (4,600,000 m^{3}). The reservoir has a surface area of 108 acres (44 ha) and receives water from a drainage area of 63.7 mi^{2} (165 km^{2}) on the north slope of the San Gabriel Mountains. A formerly popular recreation spot, the dam, reservoir, and vicinity used to receive about 300,000 visitors each year, but since 2015, the facilities have been closed to the public.

Designed by John S. Eastwood, a noted engineer of several dams in the western U.S., Littlerock was built in 1924 by the Palmdale Irrigation District (now Palmdale Water District) to provide a water supply for orchards in the area. With a height of 112 ft (34 m) and holding 2,400 acre⋅ft (3,000,000 m^{3}) of water, it was the tallest multiple-arch reinforced concrete dam in the world at the time. The dam's design combined with its record height was highly controversial; the state mandated renovations in 1932, in which concrete buttresses were added to the dam face. In 1938, the dam nearly failed as a result of historic flooding, which led to the evacuation of hundreds of people in downstream towns. The dam was renovated again in 1966 to comply with increasing safety standards and regional urban development. In the 1970s, it was listed on the National Register of Historic Places (NRHP).

In 1994, the last major renovation of the dam was completed, which involved strengthening the face with roller-compacted concrete, hiding the original multiple-arch design and transforming it to resemble a conventional gravity dam. The arches are still visible on the back face of the dam when the water level in the reservoir is low. The design changes resulted in the dam being taken off the NRHP. The dam was also raised 12 ft (3.7 m) and a new spillway added, increasing the reservoir capacity to its current 3,700 acre⋅ft (4,600,000 m^{3}).

The dam and reservoir are scheduled for a major renovation project in three separate phases. The first phase begins with construction of a subterranean grade control structure within Littlerock Reservoir at Rocky Point. The second phase is the removal of 1,165,000 cubic yards (891,000 m^{3}) of accumulated sediment from within the reservoir over a seven- to twelve-year time frame. Finally, scheduled ongoing sediment removal of approximately 38,000 cubic yards (29,000 m^{3}) per year to maintain design capacity. There are no plans to reopen its facilities to the public.

The California Office of Environmental Health Hazard Assessment (OEHHA) has developed a safe eating advisory for Little Rock Reservoir based on levels of mercury or PCBs found in fish caught from this water body.

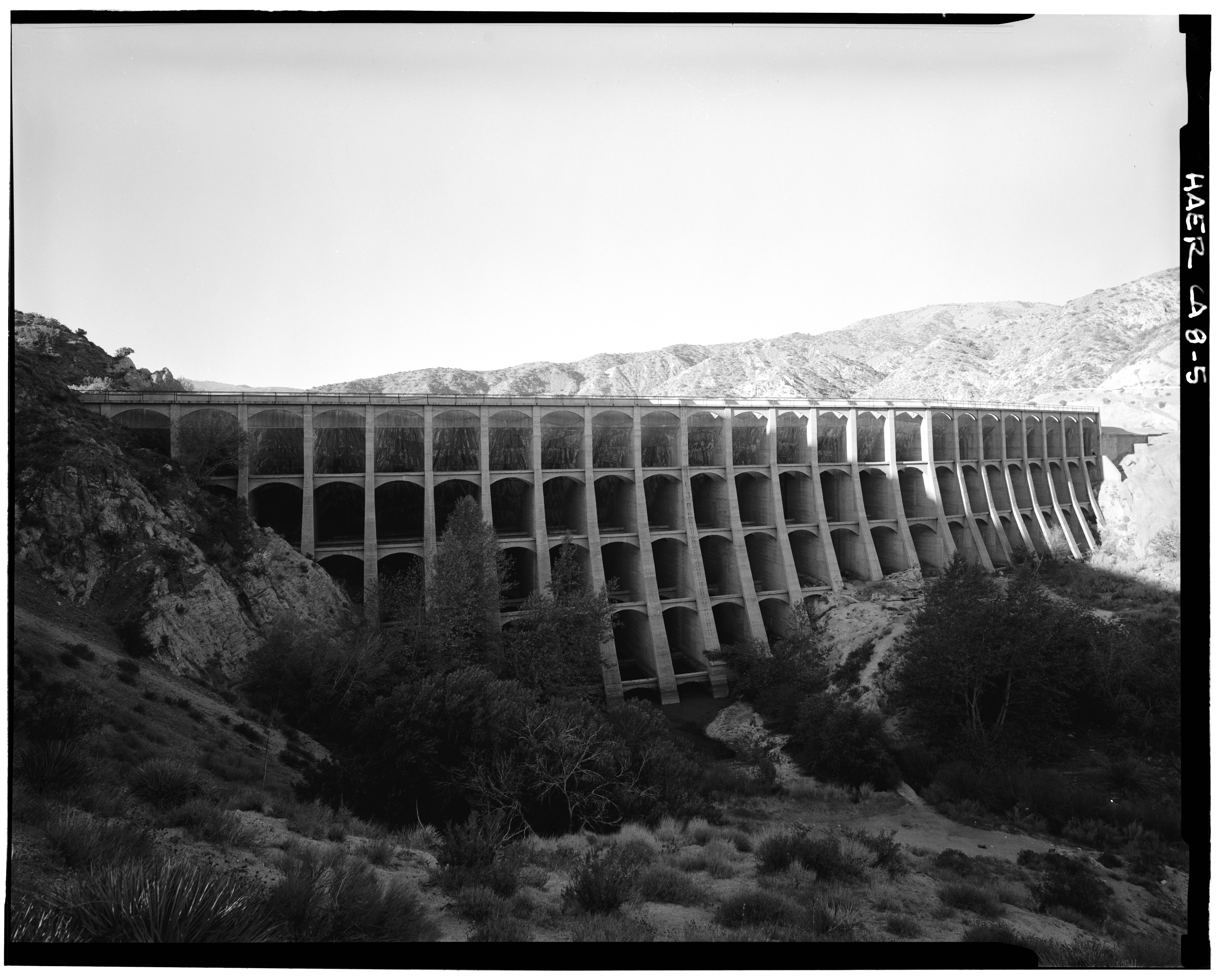

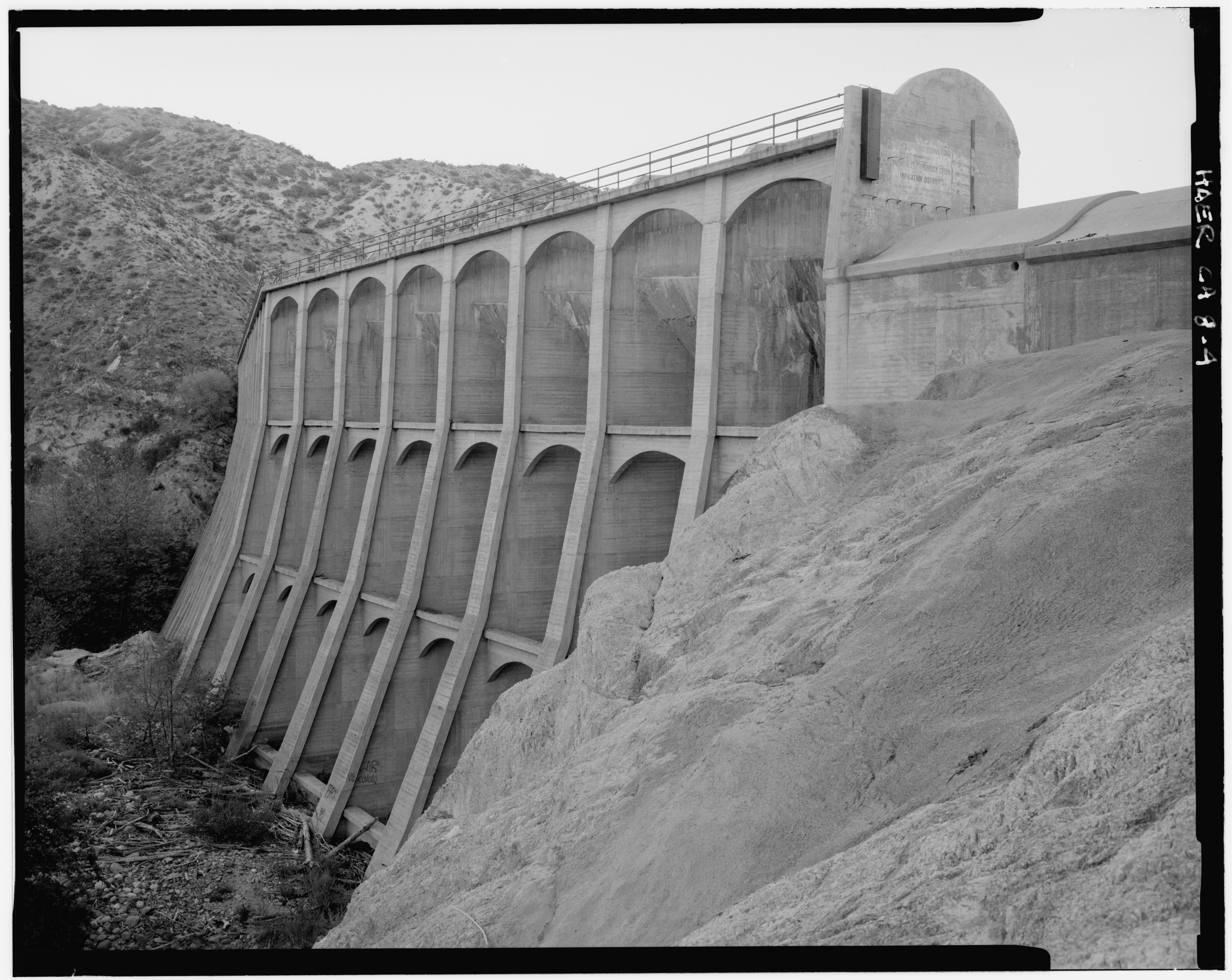

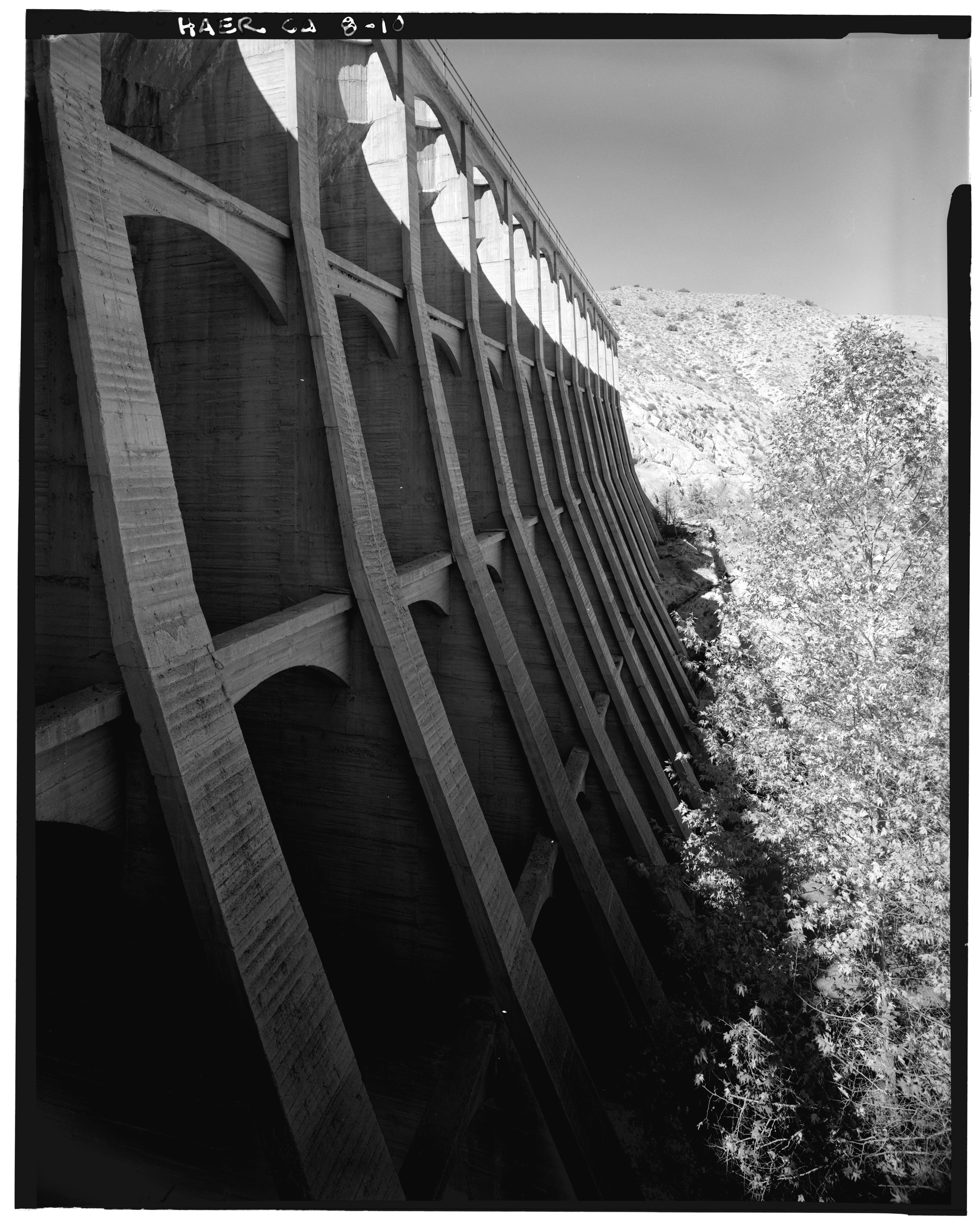

== See also ==
- List of dams and reservoirs in California
