= Palmdale, California =

City in California, United States

- City
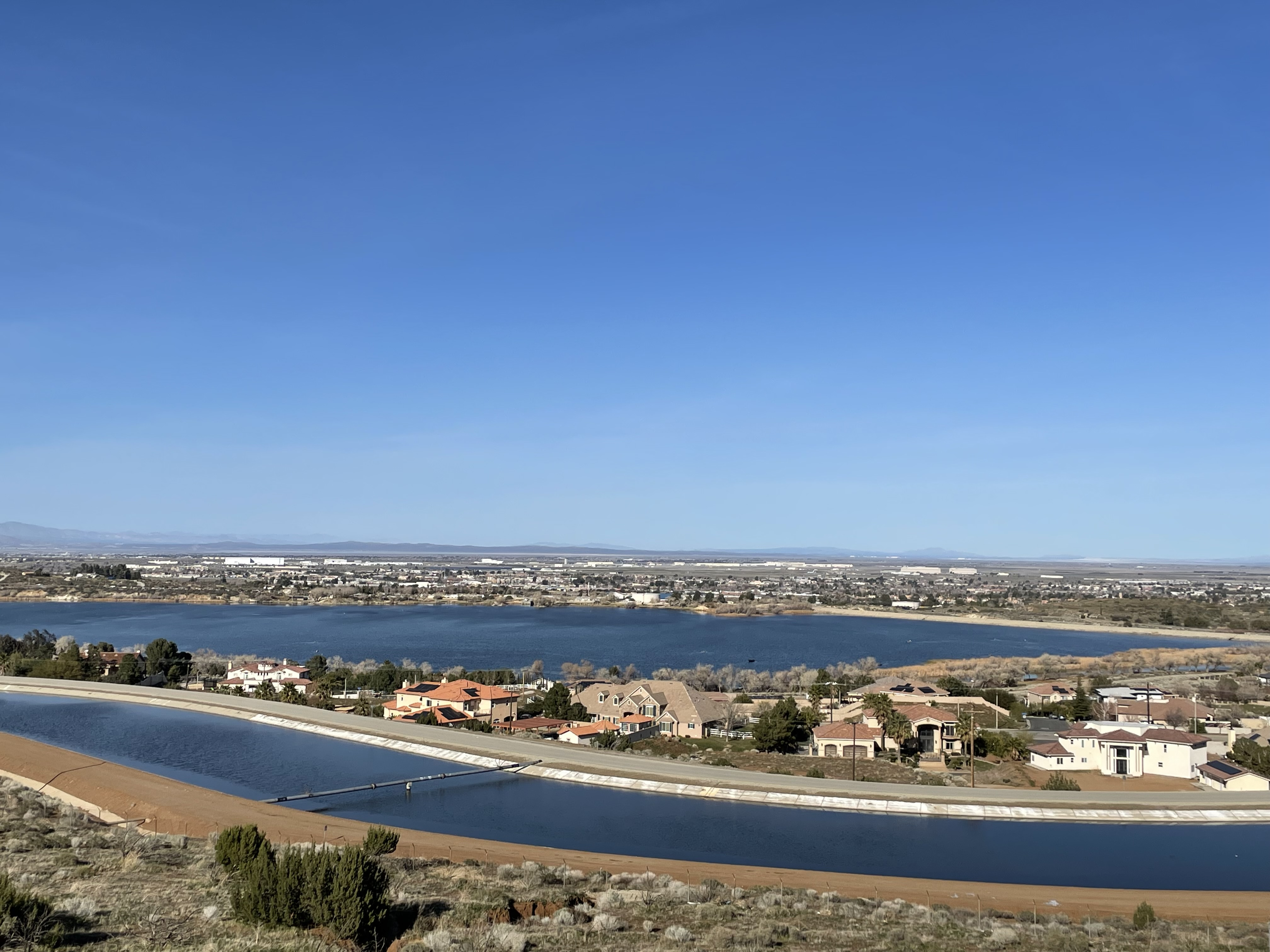

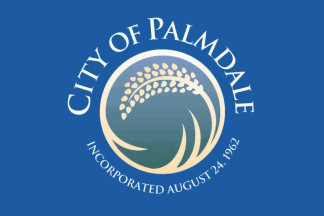
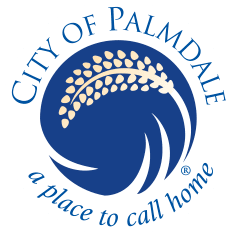
- Flag Seal
- Motto: "A Place to Call Home"
- Palmdale city limits in red
- Coordinates: 34°34′46″N 118°7′0″W
- Country: United States
- State: California
- County: Los Angeles
- Established: 1886
- Incorporated: August 24, 1962
- Named for: An anglicization of "Palmenthal", in turn named for Joshua trees, at the time referred to as "yucca palms"

Government
  - Type: Council–manager
  - Body: City council: Austin Bishop; Richard J. Loa; Laura Bettencourt (mayor pro tem); Eric Ohlsen; Andrea Alarcón
  - City Manager: Ronda Perez

Area
  - City: 106.32 sq mi (275.37 km^{2})
  - Land: 106.08 sq mi (274.74 km^{2})
  - Water: 0.24 sq mi (0.63 km^{2}) 0.24%
- Elevation: 2,660 ft (810 m)

Population (2020)
  - City: 169,450
  - Rank: 6th in Los Angeles County; 33rd in California
  - Density: 1,597.4/sq mi (616.76/km^{2})
  - Urban: 359,559 (US: 115th)
  - Urban density: 4,241/sq mi (1,637.4/km^{2})
- Time zone: UTC−8 (Pacific Time Zone)
  - Summer (DST): UTC−7 (PDT)
- ZIP Codes: 93550–93552, 93590–93591, 93599
- Area code: 661
- FIPS code: 06-55156
- Website: www.cityofpalmdaleca.gov

Palmdale is a suburban city in northern Los Angeles County, California, United States. The city lies in the Antelope Valley of Southern California. The San Gabriel Mountains separate Palmdale from the Los Angeles Basin to the south.

On August 24, 1962, Palmdale became the first city in Antelope Valley. Forty-seven years later, in November 2009, voters approved making it a charter city. Palmdale's population was 169,450 at the 2020 census, up from 152,750 at the 2010 census. Palmdale is the 33rd most populous city in California. Together with its immediate northern neighbor, the city of Lancaster, the Palmdale–Lancaster urban area had a population of 359,559 in 2020.

== History ==
Palmdale was first inhabited by various tribal pre-Americans. Populated by different groups for an estimated 11,000 years, the Antelope Valley was a trade route for nomadic pre-Americans traveling from what is now Arizona and New Mexico to California's coast. Before the arrival of Europeans, the Palmdale area had been occupied by the Kitanemuk. The Yokuts, Chumash people and Shoshone may have also been present in the area.

Spanish soldier Captain Pedro Fages explored the Antelope Valley in 1772. The opening of California to overland travel through the forbearing desert was due to Captain Juan Bautista de Anza and Father Francisco Garcés, a Spanish priest. They led a colonizing expedition, which included 136 settlers, across the Mojave Desert from Mexico to Monterey in 1773.

Later in 1776 while exploring the Valley, Garces, with several Indian guides from the San Gabriel Mission, recorded viewing the vast expanse of what was the El Tejon Rancheria (the Badger Ranch) of the Cuabajoy Indians. After the Shoshone Indians left the valley, new immigrants from Spain and Mexico established large cattle ranches there. In the late 1880s, the ranches were divided into smaller homesteads and farmed by settlers from Germany, France and the state of Nebraska.

Palmdale was a sundown town where white people often attacked minorities and forced them out of the area to uphold white supremacy.

=== Palmenthal, 1886–1913 ===
"Palmenthal", the first permanent settlement within the limits of Palmdale, was established as a village on April 20, 1886, by westward Lutheran travelers from the American Midwest, mostly of German and Swiss descent. According to area folklore, the travelers had been told they would know they were close to the ocean when they saw palm trees. They took the local Joshua trees for palms and named their settlement after them. (Palmenthal is German for Palm Valley.) According to David L. Durham, Joshua trees were sometimes called yucca palms at the time, which was the reason for the name. The village was officially established upon the arrival of a post office on June 17, 1888.

By the 1890s (soon after the last of the indigenous antelopes, which the valley was named after, had been hunted to extinction), farming families continued to migrate to Palmenthal and nearby Harold to grow grain and fruit. Most of these settlers were unfamiliar with farming in a desert climate, so when the drought years occurred, most abandoned their settlement.

By 1899, only one family was left in the original village. The rest of the settlers, along with the post office, moved closer to the Southern Pacific railroad tracks. This new community was renamed Palmdale and was located where the present-day civic center is. A railroad station was built along the tracks there. This railroad was operated by Southern Pacific and traveled between Los Angeles and San Francisco. The Wells Fargo stagecoach line that ran between San Francisco and New Orleans stopped there as well.

The only remaining pieces of evidence of the original settlements of Palmenthal and Harold are the old Palmdale Pioneer cemetery located on the northeast corner of Avenue S and 20th Street East, acquired and restored by the city as part of a future historical park, and the old schoolhouse, now relocated to McAdam Park.

Palmdale's modern development commenced in the mid-1800s due to the influence of the gold rush, cattle ranching, the introduction of stagecoaches, and the establishment of the Southern Pacific Railroad line in 1876. Significant population expansion only took place after the completion of the California aqueduct in 1913, drawing in a considerable influx of farmers.

=== First two decades of the Town of Palmdale, 1913–1933 ===
As the population of Palmdale began to increase after relocation, water became scarce, until November 5, 1913, when the California – Los Angeles Aqueduct system was completed by William Mulholland, bringing water from the Owens Valley into Los Angeles County. During this period, crops of apples, pears and alfalfa became plentiful.

In 1915, Palmdale's first newspaper, the Palmdale Post, was published. Today it is called the Antelope Valley Press.

In 1921, the first major motor vehicle link between Palmdale and Los Angeles was completed, Mint Canyon/Lancaster Road, later designated U.S. Route 6. Completion of this road caused the local agricultural industry to flourish and was the first major step towards defining the metropolis that exists today. Presently this road is known as Sierra Highway.

In 1924, the Little Rock Dam and the Harold Reservoir, present day Lake Palmdale, were constructed to assist the agricultural industry and have enough water to serve the growing communities.

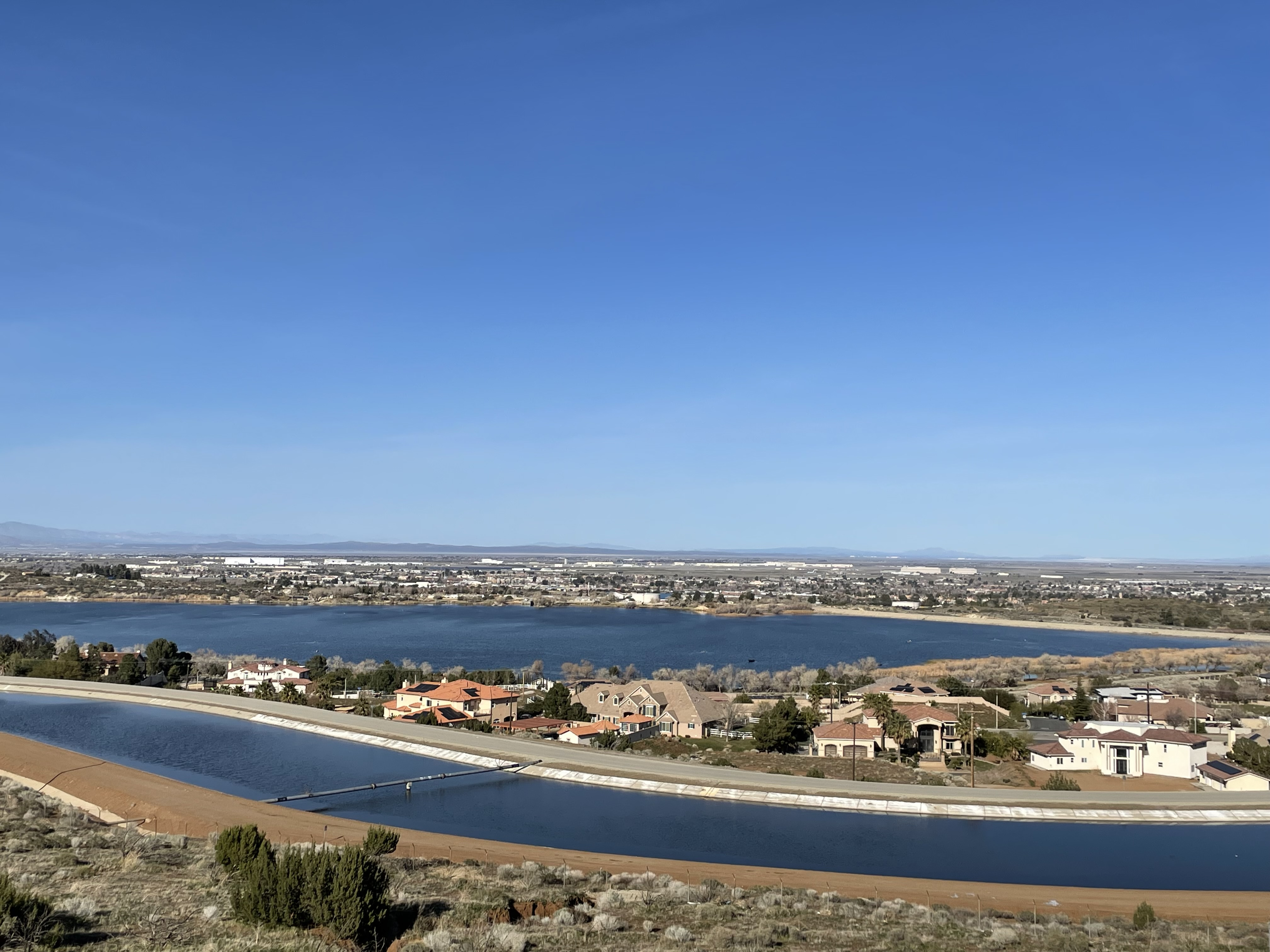
A photo of Palmdale, ca from the Lamont Odett Vista Point, 14 freeway north as of 2026

=== Next three decades of the Town of Palmdale, 1933–1962 ===
Agriculture continued to be the foremost industry for Palmdale and its northern neighbor Lancaster until the outbreak of World War II. In 1933, the United States government established Muroc Air Base (from an original founder's name, Effie Corum, spelled backwards) six miles (9.7 km) north of Lancaster in Kern County, now known as Edwards Air Force Base. They also bought Palmdale Airport in 1952 and established an aerospace development and testing facility called United States Air Force Plant 42. One year later, in 1953, Lockheed established a facility at the airport. After this time, the aerospace industry took over as the primary local source of employment. The city has been referred to as the "Aerospace Capital of America" because of its heritage in being the home of many of the aircraft used in the United States military.

In August 1956, an unpiloted out-of-control Navy drone flew over Palmdale while Air Force Interceptor aircraft tried to shoot it down with unguided rockets. Many rockets landed in and around the city, starting fires and damaging property.

In 1957, Palmdale's first high school, Palmdale High School, was established, making it easier to not have to travel to Antelope Valley High School in nearby Lancaster.

=== Incorporation, 1962–1980 ===
In August 1962, the township of Palmdale officially became the city of Palmdale with the incorporation of 2 square miles (5 km^{2}) of land around the present day civic center.

In 1964, the Antelope Valley Freeway, or State Highway 14, was completed as a link between Palmdale and Los Angeles. The freeway at this time ran all the way to present-day Technology Drive. It was at this time that talk about the future Palmdale Intercontinental Airport was seen as the way of the future. By 1965, the new city had annexed an additional 20 square miles (52 km^{2}) of land and industry was thriving. Talk of the future commercial airport had many investors buying up large quantities of land.

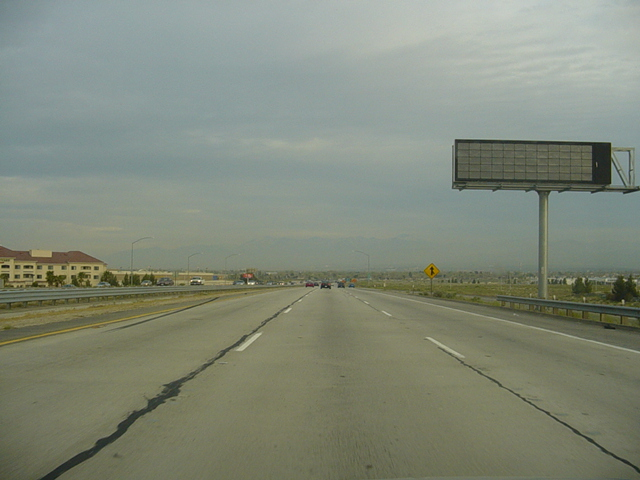
Antelope Valley Freeway looking southbound near downtown Palmdale on a day with sparse traffic.

In 1970, the city of Los Angeles went forward with buying 17,750 acres (71.8 km^{2}) of land east of the city for its proposed intercontinental commercial airport. However, the United States Air Force desired to put construction of this new facility on hold until the existing airport reached its commercial capacity. So, under a joint-use agreement with the military, the Los Angeles Department of Airports, now called Los Angeles World Airports, built a 9,000 square-foot (800 m^{2}) terminal (on leased land) that opened in 1971, creating present-day LA/Palmdale Regional Airport, which the City of Palmdale has taken control of in an effort to establish reliable air service in the region.

By 1974, the Antelope Valley Freeway construction ended at the southern border of Mojave in Kern County. In 1977, Palmdale built its first municipal building, the Palmdale City Library. This was the same year that its northern neighbor Lancaster incorporated as a city. Since the 1920s, Lancaster had been the much larger and principal community of the Antelope Valley, as well as the rest of California's Mojave Desert.

=== First housing market growth and recession, 1980–1990 ===
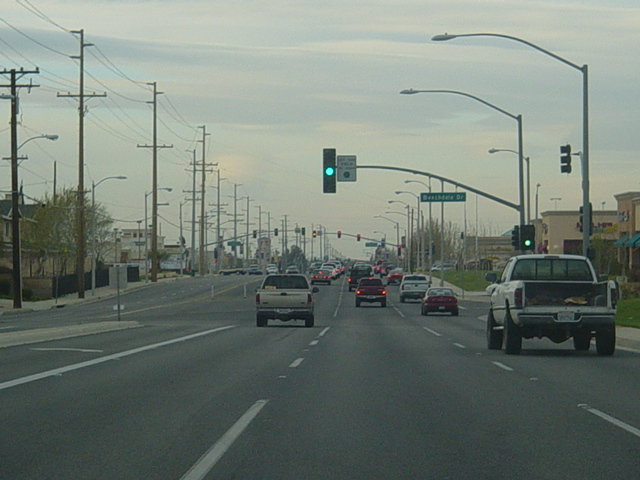
Central Palmdale looking north along 10th Street West toward Rancho Vista Boulevard

The 1980s and 1990s were the decades that started to define the two Antelope Valley cities. Affordable housing in the area caused a dramatic spike in the population. The city, like its northern neighbor Lancaster, became a bedroom community for those employed in Los Angeles. In 1980, Palmdale's population was 12,227.

== Geography ==
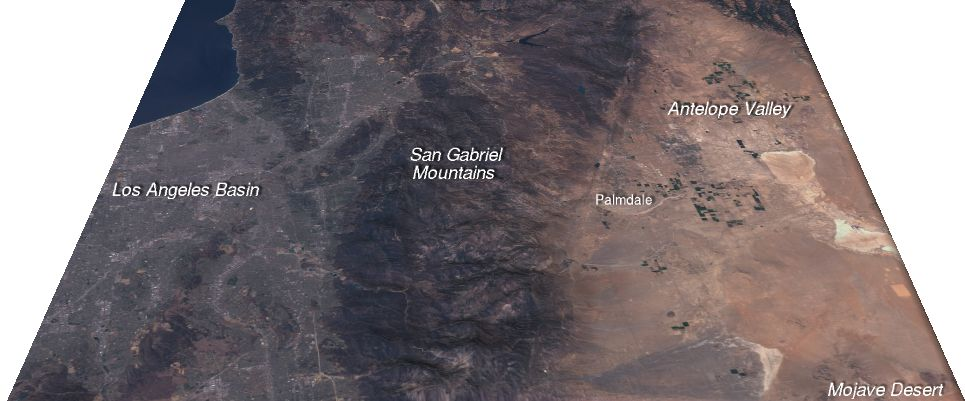
Satellite image showing the Antelope Valley area in relation to Los Angeles with the San Gabriel Mountains separating them.

Palmdale is located in Los Angeles County, and the urbanized centers of Palmdale and Los Angeles are separated by the San Gabriel mountain range, which is about 40 miles (64 km) wide. This range forms the southern edge of the Antelope Valley portion of the Mojave Desert. Palmdale is the second-most populous city in the Antelope Valley, and fifth overall in the Mojave Desert, after Las Vegas, Henderson, North Las Vegas, Nevada; and Lancaster. Palmdale is part of a twin-city complex with its northern neighbor Lancaster and together they are the principal cities within the Antelope Valley region and California's High Desert.

Downtown Palmdale is located at 34°34′46″N 118°07′00″W, at an elevation of 2,655 feet (809 m) above sea level.

According to the United States Census Bureau the city has a total area of 106.2 square miles (275 km^{2}), of which 106.0 square miles (275 km^{2}) is land and 0.3 square miles (0.78 km^{2}) is water (including man-made Lake Palmdale, the most visible and scenic part of the municipal water supply system). The total area comprises 0.24% water.

The city lies in proximity to the San Andreas Fault, making it prone to severe earthquakes. This fault cuts across the Antelope Valley Freeway just north of the Avenue S off-ramp; running westward along the old Butterfield Stage Line (now Elizabeth Lake Road) into Leona Valley.

Looking south from the hills near Tierra Subida Avenue, January snow can be seen at the higher elevations.

=== Climate ===
Typical of the High Desert, Palmdale has a desert climate (Köppen climate classification BWk), and it is part of USDA Plant Hardiness Zone 8b. Winters are cool to mild, with daily normal minimum temperatures at or just below freezing from late November until late January, and the coolest month, December, having a normal mean temperature of 44.4 °F (6.9 °C). Summers are hot and nearly rainless, with July and August, tied for the hottest month, having a normal mean temperature of 81.2 °F (27.3 °C). On average, annually there are 52 mornings with a minimum at or below freezing, and 35 afternoons with a maximum at or above 100 °F (37.8 °C). The normal annual rainfall is 5.90 in (150 mm), occurring on an average of only 27 days.

Record temperatures range from 3 °F (−16.1 °C) on January 13, 1963, to 126 °F (52.2 °C) on August 5, 1990. The "rain year" from July 1940 to June 1941 had the highest annual precipitation on record, at 18.41 in (467.6 mm), whilst the most precipitation in a calendar month was in December 1943 at 7.55 in (191.8 mm), as well as the most in one calendar day on December 11, 1943, at 3.43 in (87.1 mm); conversely, the lowest annual precipitation was 1.15 in (29.2 mm) from July 2012 to June 2013.

Climate data for Palmdale Regional Airport, California (1991–2020 normals, (Note: Mean monthly maxima and minima (i.e. the expected highest and lowest temperature readings at any point during the year or given month) calculated based on data at said location from 1991 to 2020.) extremes 1931–present)
| Month | Jan | Feb | Mar | Apr | May | Jun | Jul | Aug | Sep | Oct | Nov | Dec | Year |
|---|---|---|---|---|---|---|---|---|---|---|---|---|---|
| Record high °F (°C) | 85 (29) | 85 (29) | 91 (33) | 98 (37) | 106 (41) | 113 (45) | 115 (46) | 118 (48) | 111 (44) | 105 (41) | 88 (31) | 85 (29) | 118 (48) |
| Mean maximum °F (°C) | 72.3 (22.4) | 75.1 (23.9) | 81.8 (27.7) | 90.3 (32.4) | 97.1 (36.2) | 104.2 (40.1) | 107.5 (41.9) | 106.4 (41.3) | 102.7 (39.3) | 93.0 (33.9) | 81.6 (27.6) | 72.3 (22.4) | 109.1 (42.8) |
| Mean daily maximum °F (°C) | 58.9 (14.9) | 61.8 (16.6) | 67.5 (19.7) | 73.4 (23.0) | 82.0 (27.8) | 91.0 (32.8) | 97.6 (36.4) | 97.7 (36.5) | 91.6 (33.1) | 79.7 (26.5) | 67.3 (19.6) | 57.7 (14.3) | 77.2 (25.1) |
| Daily mean °F (°C) | 45.9 (7.7) | 48.9 (9.4) | 53.8 (12.1) | 59.3 (15.2) | 67.4 (19.7) | 75.4 (24.1) | 82.5 (28.1) | 81.8 (27.7) | 75.2 (24.0) | 64.1 (17.8) | 52.5 (11.4) | 44.7 (7.1) | 62.6 (17.0) |
| Mean daily minimum °F (°C) | 32.8 (0.4) | 36.1 (2.3) | 40.2 (4.6) | 45.2 (7.3) | 52.8 (11.6) | 59.9 (15.5) | 67.4 (19.7) | 66.0 (18.9) | 58.8 (14.9) | 48.6 (9.2) | 37.7 (3.2) | 31.6 (−0.2) | 48.1 (8.9) |
| Mean minimum °F (°C) | 23.0 (−5.0) | 25.4 (−3.7) | 29.4 (−1.4) | 34.5 (1.4) | 42.4 (5.8) | 48.1 (8.9) | 56.3 (13.5) | 55.7 (13.2) | 48.5 (9.2) | 37.0 (2.8) | 26.0 (−3.3) | 21.3 (−5.9) | 19.5 (−6.9) |
| Record low °F (°C) | 3 (−16) | 11 (−12) | 16 (−9) | 26 (−3) | 28 (−2) | 30 (−1) | 44 (7) | 41 (5) | 32 (0) | 18 (−8) | 4 (−16) | 6 (−14) | 3 (−16) |
| Average precipitation inches (mm) | 0.98 (25) | 1.49 (38) | 0.87 (22) | 0.26 (6.6) | 0.13 (3.3) | 0.02 (0.51) | 0.11 (2.8) | 0.03 (0.76) | 0.16 (4.1) | 0.47 (12) | 0.36 (9.1) | 1.02 (26) | 5.90 (150) |
| Average precipitation days (≥ 0.01 in) | 4.4 | 5.2 | 3.7 | 2.2 | 1.0 | 0.3 | 0.8 | 0.6 | 0.7 | 1.3 | 2.3 | 4.3 | 26.8 |
Source: NOAA

=== Flora and fauna ===
Native wildflowers, including California poppies, grow in Palmdale.

Plants native to Palmdale are big berry manzanita, fremont cottonwood, California aster, White Sage, Giant wildrye, Deerbrush, California buckwheat, Black Sage, California Goldfields, Antelope Bitterbrush, Golden Yarrow, Desert Globemallow and more. Animals in the area are golden mantled ground squirrel, Beechey ground squirrel, red-tailed hawk, Cooper's hawk, Stellar's jay, leopard frog and rattlesnake. Coyotes are found throughout Palmdale. The California condor, a rare species of bird, occupies Palmdale. Palmdale was a juniper berry processing area. California poppies are grown near Palmdale.

== Demographics ==
Historical population
| Census | Pop. | Note | %± |
|---|---|---|---|
| 1960 | 11,522 | | — |
| 1970 | 8,511 | | −26.1% |
| 1980 | 12,277 | | 44.2% |
| 1990 | 68,842 | | 460.7% |
| 2000 | 116,670 | | 69.5% |
| 2010 | 152,750 | | 30.9% |
| 2020 | 169,450 | | 10.9% |
U.S. Decennial Census

Palmdale city, California – Racial and ethnic composition Note: the US Census treats Hispanic/Latino as an ethnic category. This table excludes Latinos from the racial categories and assigns them to a separate category. Hispanics/Latinos may be of any race.
| Race / Ethnicity (NH = Non-Hispanic) | Pop 1980 | Pop 1990 | Pop 2000 | Pop 2010 | Pop 2020 | % 1980 | % 1990 | % 2000 | % 2010 | % 2020 |
|---|---|---|---|---|---|---|---|---|---|---|
| White alone (NH) | 10,326 | 46,002 | 47,831 | 37,390 | 28,739 | 84.11% | 66.82% | 41.00% | 24.48% | 16.96% |
| Black or African American alone (NH) | 420 | 4,200 | 16,447 | 21,595 | 22,000 | 3.42% | 6.10% | 14.10% | 14.14% | 12.98% |
| Native American or Alaska Native alone (NH) | 232 | 479 | 622 | 477 | 489 | 1.89% | 0.70% | 0.53% | 0.31% | 0.29% |
| Asian alone (NH) | 159 | 2,880 | 4,327 | 6,223 | 7,007 | 1.30% | 4.18% | 3.71% | 4.07% | 4.14% |
| Pacific Islander alone (NH) | 159 | 2,880 | 163 | 211 | 278 | 1.30% | 4.18% | 0.14% | 0.14% | 0.16% |
| Other race alone (NH) | 9 | 127 | 265 | 396 | 1,112 | 0.07% | 0.18% | 0.23% | 0.26% | 0.66% |
| Mixed race or Multiracial (NH) | x | x | 3,024 | 3,361 | 5,083 | x | x | 2.59% | 2.20% | 3.00% |
| Hispanic or Latino (any race) | 1,131 | 15,154 | 43,991 | 83,097 | 104,742 | 9.21% | 22.01% | 37.71% | 54.40% | 61.81% |
| Total | 12,277 | 68,842 | 116,670 | 152,750 | 169,450 | 100.00% | 100.00% | 100.00% | 100.00% | 100.00% |

=== 2020 ===
The 2020 United States census reported that Palmdale had a population of 169,450. The population density was 1,597.6 inhabitants per square mile (616.8/km^{2}). The racial makeup of Palmdale was 26.6% White, 13.6% African American, 2.1% Native American, 4.4% Asian, 0.2% Pacific Islander, 35.8% from other races, and 17.3% from two or more races. Hispanic or Latino residents of any race were 61.8% of the population.

The census reported that 99.88% of the population lived in households, 0.12% lived in non-institutionalized group quarters, and 0.01% were institutionalized.

There were 48,355 households, out of which 46.0% included children under the age of 18, 51.3% were married-couple households, 7.2% were cohabiting couple households, 26.3% had a female householder with no partner present, and 15.2% had a male householder with no partner present. 14.9% of households were one person, and 6.0% were one person aged 65 or older. The average household size was 3.5. There were 39,149 families (81.0% of all households).

The age distribution was 27.8% under the age of 18, 11.0% aged 18 to 24, 26.1% aged 25 to 44, 24.6% aged 45 to 64, and 10.5% who were 65 years of age or older. The median age was 33.1 years. For every 100 females, there were 95.2 males.

There were 49,686 housing units at an average density of 468.5 units per square mile (180.9 units/km^{2}), of which 48,355 (97.3%) were occupied. Of these, 66.5% were owner-occupied, and 33.5% were occupied by renters.

In 2023, the US Census Bureau estimated that the median household income was $81,151, and the per capita income was $28,767. About 11.9% of families and 14.6% of the population were below the poverty line.

=== 2010 ===
The 2010 United States census reported that Palmdale had a population of 152,750. The population density was 1,438.1 inhabitants per square mile (555.3/km^{2}). The racial makeup of Palmdale was 74,901 (49.0%) White, (24.5% Non-Hispanic White), 22,677 (14.8%) African American, 1,316 (0.9%) Native American, 6,548 (4.3%) Asian (2.2% Filipino, 0.4% Indian, 0.4% Korean, 0.3% Chinese, 0.3% Vietnamese, 0.2% Japanese, 0.16% Cambodian, 0.11% Thai and 0.07% Pakistani), 335 (0.2%) Pacific Islander, 38,773 (25.4%) from other races, and 8,200 (5.4%) from two or more races. There were 83,097 Hispanic or Latino residents (54.4%). 38.1% of Palmdale residents were of Mexican ancestry; 6.2% Salvadoran; 2.4% of Guatemalan heritage; 0.79% Honduran, 0.76% Puerto Rican, 0.69% Nicaraguan, 0.50% Cuban, 0.47% Colombian and 0.34% Argentinian ancestry. Spanish is spoken by 36.4% of the population and Tagalog by 1.3%. The most common ancestries are German 5.2%, Irish 4.1%, English 2.9%, Italian 2.7%, French 1.1%, Polish 1.0%, Norwegian 0.7%, Scottish 0.6%, Dutch 0.6%, Russian 0.6%, Swedish 0.5%, Belizean 0.4%, Armenian 0.4% and Danish, Welsh and Greek 0.3%.

According to the 2000 Census, Mexican and German were the most common ancestries in Palmdale. Mexico and El Salvador were the most common foreign places of birth.

The Census reported that 152,551 people (99.9% of the population) lived in households, 158 (0.1%) lived in non-institutionalized group quarters, and 41 (0%) were institutionalized.

There were 42,952 households, out of which 23,345 (54.4%) had children under the age of 18 living in them, 24,199 (56.3%) were opposite-sex married couples living together, 7,821 (18.2%) had a female householder with no husband present, 3,318 (7.7%) had a male householder with no wife present. There were 2,998 (7.0%) unmarried opposite-sex partnerships, and 316 (0.7%) same-sex married couples or partnerships. 5,828 households (13.6%) were made up of individuals, and 1,880 (4.4%) had someone living alone who was 65 years of age or older. The average household size was 3.55. There were 35,338 families (82.3% of all households); the average family size was 3.87.

The age distribution of the population included 50,514 people (33.1%) under the age of 18, 17,089 people (11.2%) aged 18 to 24, 40,077 people (26.2%) aged 25 to 44, 34,963 people (22.9%) aged 45 to 64, and 10,107 people (6.6%) who were 65 years of age or older. The median age was 29.7 years. For every 100 females, there were 95.3 males. For every 100 females age 18 and over, there were 91.3 males.

There were 46,544 housing units at an average density of 438.2 units per square mile (169.2 units/km^{2}), of which 29,167 (67.9%) were owner-occupied, and 13,785 (32.1%) were occupied by renters. The homeowner vacancy rate was 3.2%; the rental vacancy rate was 9.4%. 102,444 people (67.1% of the population) lived in owner-occupied housing units and 50,107 people (32.8%) lived in rental housing units. According to US Census Population Estimates, July 1, 2022: 15.8% of the population was living below the federal poverty line.

=== Religion ===
37.0% of people are Catholic in Palmdale. 53.4% in the city are religious.

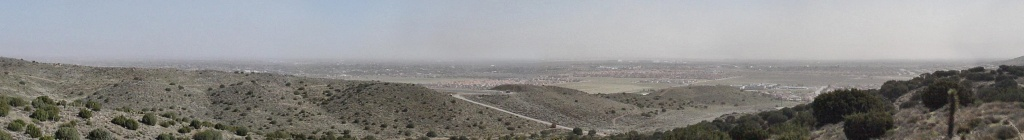
Panoramic photo of Palmdale from the west, taken March 2000

=== Homelessness ===
In 2022, Los Angeles Homeless Services Authority's Greater Los Angeles Homeless Count counted 309 homeless individuals in Palmdale.

Homeless population
| Year | Pop. | ±% |
|---|---|---|
| 2016 | 325 | — |
| 2017 | 398 | +22.5% |
| 2018 | 203 | −49.0% |
| 2019 | 290 | +42.9% |
| 2020 | 289 | −0.3% |
| 2022 | 309 | +6.9% |
Source: Greater Los Angeles Homeless Count; Los Angeles Homeless Services Authority

== Economy ==
The most important industry for Palmdale is the aerospace industry. Other manufacturing companies have relocated to Palmdale seeking more affordable land, proximity to Palmdale Airport, and special tax breaks.

The special tax breaks granted for companies that relocate to Palmdale are due to the city having the Antelope Valley Enterprise Zone and the Palmdale Federal Foreign Trade Zone. These are special zoning areas within the city that are given various state and federal tax breaks and municipal grant incentives to relocate their business there. These zones were put in effect to help Palmdale, as well as nearby Lancaster, draw more jobs to the area so that they would be less dependent on the Los Angeles Basin and the San Fernando Valley area for employment. This will help relieve traffic congestion and pollution and stabilize the Antelope Valley economy on several industries. The local governments of the Antelope Valley seek to diversify their economies and not just depend on the aerospace industry as it is known for having "feast or famine" seasons.

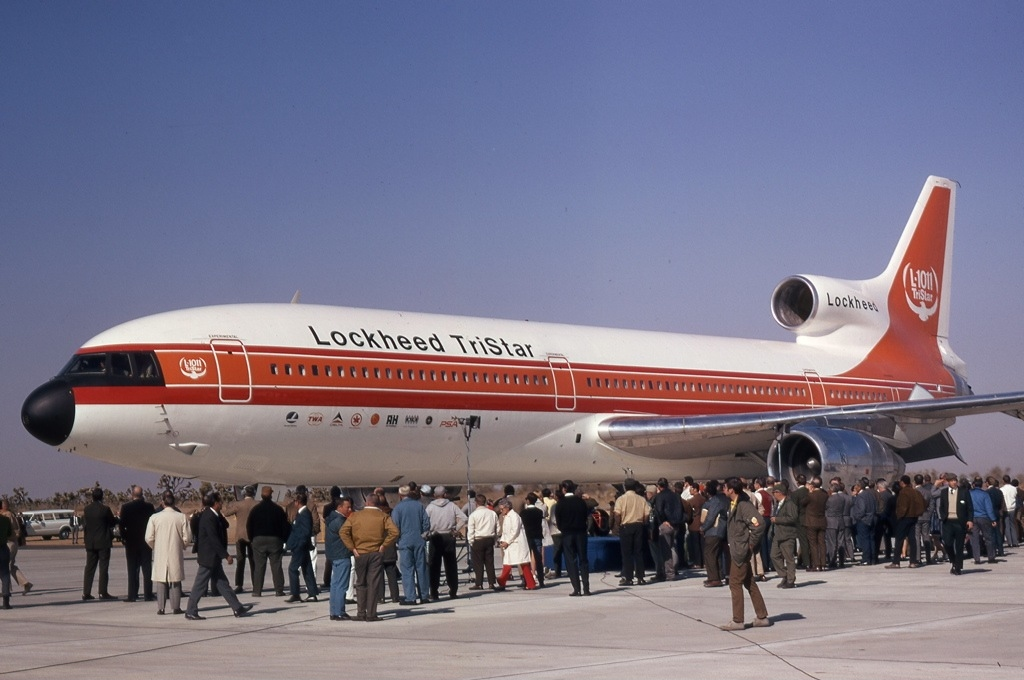
A completed Lockheed L-1011; this aircraft was built and underwent testing at Palmdale

Palmdale refers to itself with the nickname the "aerospace capital of the United States", and has been the site of research, development, final assembly, flight testing and/or servicing/modifications of the Space Shuttle, B-1 Lancer, X-15, B-2 Spirit, B-21 Raider, F-117 Nighthawk, F-22 Raptor, F-35 Lightning II, SR-71 Blackbird, Lockheed L-1011 Tristar, and many other aircraft that have been used in the United States Air Force, NASA and air forces and airlines around the world. USAF Plant 42, where the aerospace projects occurred / occur is home to major operations of the following aerospace companies: Boeing, Lockheed Martin and its famed Skunk Works, and Northrop Grumman. The Los Angeles World Airports owns the former Boeing hangar (formerly North American Rockwell) at Plant 42 near LA/Palmdale Regional Airport which is one of the largest buildings in the world. The hangar was used for the set of the 2004 film The Terminal, which featured an enormous replica of a JFK International Airport terminal. NASA's SOFIA program relocated its operation to this hangar at Site 9 from Edwards Air Force Base.

A number of world class corporations and manufacturing firms have made Palmdale home, helping to diversify the local economy. Delta Scientific, a world leader in high strength vehicle barrier systems, supplying protection for many federal, state and local buildings, and a prime supplier to the military and US State Department for embassies and other installations worldwide, and US Pole, a major manufacturer of street lighting poles, are major anchor tenants in the Fairway Business Park. The Palmdale Trade and Commerce Center is home to many other major manufacturing, industrial, corporate offices and other employers, as well as home to the Palmdale Auto Mall. A number of medical and related support offices are coming on-line to meet the needs of the new Palmdale Regional Medical Center. On July 8, 2009, Quallion LLC, which manufactures lithium ion cells and battery packs, announced plans to build a battery manufacturing plant in Palmdale if it won a government grant being offered by the U.S. Department of Energy.

Beginning in the 1960s, Palmdale was home to Don Babb's The Model A Ford Company, which became Classic Manufacturing and Supply, builder of exact reproduction and custom steel bodies and parts for hot rods and customs.

With an $890-million contract to build 175 light-rail cars for Metropolitan Transportation Authority that was behind schedule, Kinkisharyo, the El Segundo-based U.S. arm of Kinki Sharyo Co. Ltd. of Osaka announced in December 2014 that they would retrofit an existing space in Palmdale to build the P3010 series vehicles. A major shipment was needed for the Expo Line Phase II extension to Santa Monica and Foothill Extension to Azusa which were scheduled to open in 2016. The balance of the 175 cars will be needed in the following years as the K Line and Regional Connector open. Final assembly work has already occurred in hangar space the company leased in Palmdale from Los Angeles World Airports. The first car was delivered to Metro in October for testing before series production begins.

The Mershops Antelope Valley is the retail shopping destination in the region, with a variety of dining choices on its restaurant row.

Onions are the most valued crop that grows in Palmdale. Some of Antelope Valley's onions were exported to Japan, Taiwan, Dubai and Australia. Other crops grown in Palmdale and the Antelope Valley are alfalfa, wheat, fruit, oats and barley.

=== Largest employers ===
Employers include:

- Northrop Grumman 7,000
- Lockheed Martin 3,750
- Antelope Valley Union High School District 3,089
- Palmdale School District 2,100
- Antelope Valley Mall 1,800
- Palmdale Regional Medical Center 1,200
- Walmart 800
- Palmdale School District 1,792
- Walmart 1,242
- Robertson's Ready Mix Concrete 500
- Palmdale Auto Mall 410
- Granite Construction 400

== Government ==
=== Local government ===
Palmdale is a Charter City governed under the council / manager form of local government. Beginning with the November 2016 election, the City Council was subjected to districting, with councilmembers were selected from each of 4 districts. The mayor is elected at-large every two years for a two-year term. Every two years, two of the four district council members are elected to serve four-year terms. Palmdale does not have term limits for council and mayor.

The City Council appoints the City Manager and City Attorney.

The city also has an appointed Planning Commission divided into four separate districts. The Planning Commission was organized to help with the planning, zoning, and development of various city areas in different districts and to give the residents of those particular districts a greater voice in local land use decisions. There is also an appointed Board of Library Trustees, and Youth Council.

On November 3, 2009, local residents voted in favor of a measure to change Palmdale's general law city status to that of a Charter city. This allowed Palmdale to draft a city charter and constitution, enabling it to make more decisions at the local level without interference or rules from the state government.

Palmdale has animal services, Palmdale Animal Care Center.

=== Municipal services ===
The city provides a number of municipal services, including a Planning Department, Economic Development Department, Building and Safety Department, Public Works Department, Parks and Recreation Department, and Library Department. The city also operates the Palmdale Transportation Center which serves as the hub for public transit services including Metrolink trains, Antelope Valley Transit Authority, Amtrak Thruway, and Greyhound Lines. Palmdale was selected as a stop for the California High-Speed Rail system that will link northern and southern California. City officials have formed the Palmdale Airport Authority, as they pursue regional air service from a joint use facility at USAF Plant 42.

Recreation and cultural services include the Palmdale City Library, Legacy Commons, Larry Chimbole Cultural Center, Palmdale Playhouse and Art Gallery, Dry Town Water Park, Palmdale Amphitheater, Best of the West Softball Complex, Hammack Activity Center, Palmdale Oasis Park Recreation Center, Marie Kerr Park Recreation Center, Joe Davies Heritage Airpark at Palmdale Plant 42, and four swimming pools.

=== Public safety ===
The city is policed by the Los Angeles County Sheriff's Department under a formal contract with the County of Los Angeles and has its municipal judicial system intertwined with the Los Angeles County Superior Court.

The Los Angeles County Sheriff's Department (LASD) operates the Palmdale Station in Palmdale. Palmdale has the largest Sheriff's Station in Los Angeles County. Palmdale's innovative Partners Against Crime (PAC) Program, a cooperative effort between law enforcement, landlords and community members, has successfully focused on quality of life issues and crime suppression, reducing the crime rate annually. Recently, the Partners for a Better Palmdale program was initiated by the City Council, to further engage residents, schools, community groups and law enforcement in improving community quality of life. The city pioneered the use of municipal Community Service Officers for low level incidents to free up Deputies for higher priority matters, and employ high-tech tools, such as Automated License Plate Recognition Systems on patrol cars, to increase officer productivity.

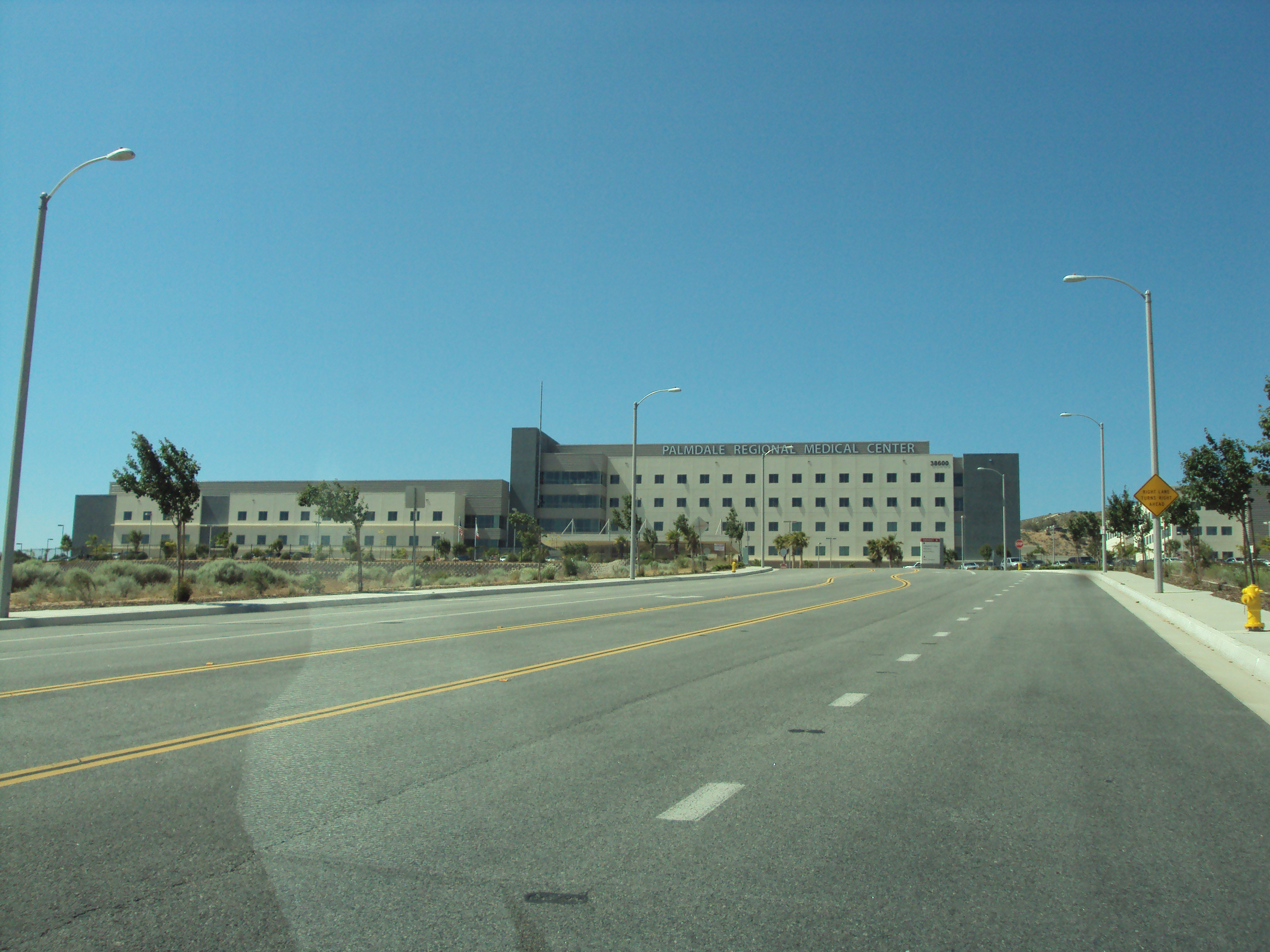
Palmdale Regional Medical Center handles the city's medical services.

The city is served by the Los Angeles County Fire Department for its fire and paramedic services through the Consolidated Fire Protection District. Palmdale downtown Station #37 is one of the busiest fire stations in the United States. Two new fire stations went into service in late 2008 on the east and west sides of Palmdale.

=== Public utilities ===
Utility services within the city are provided by several public and private agencies. Water service is primarily provided by Palmdale Water District (separate public agency) and Los Angeles County Waterworks (part of the County Public Works); sewer service is provided by the County Sanitation Districts of Los Angeles County (separate public agency, with City Council members on district board); electrical service is provided by Southern California Edison; natural gas service is provided by Southern California Gas; cable television service is provided by Time Warner Cable; telephone service is provided by AT&T and Frontier; refuse pickup and disposal service is provided by Waste Management, Inc of the Antelope Valley under a franchise agreement with the city. The city successfully licensed and sold permits for a hybrid natural gas and steam turbine power facility and its operator is awaiting state approval of amendments to begin construction.

=== County representation ===
The Los Angeles County Department of Health Services operates the Antelope Valley Health Center in Lancaster, serving Palmdale.

In the Los Angeles County Board of Supervisors, Palmdale is in the 5th District, represented by Kathryn Barger.

Los Angeles County Animal Care Services operates the Palmdale Animal Care Center in Palmdale.

=== State and federal representation ===
In the California State Senate, Palmdale is in the 23rd senatorial district, represented by Republican Suzette Martinez Valladares. In the California State Assembly, it is split between the 34th Assembly district, represented by Republican Tom Lackey, and the 39th Assembly district, represented by Democrat Juan Carrillo.

In the United States House of Representatives, Palmdale is in California's 27th congressional district, represented by Democrat George T. Whitesides.

== Education ==
=== Kindergarten – grade 12 schools ===
Palmdale has three separate elementary school districts and one high school district:

- The Palmdale School District is one of the largest elementary school districts in the nation consisting of 31 schools with about 18,000 students (2024 estimate). This school district covers the majority of the city's kindergarten through 12th grade students. One of the unique features of this school district was its practice of naming schools after desert flora and fauna. For instance, there are Tumbleweed, Juniper, Yucca, Mesquite, Manzanita and Joshua Hills schools.
- The Westside Union School District covers the schools on the far west-side of Palmdale and its western suburbs. This school district has over 8,250 students and 11 schools for K–8 education.
- The Keppel Union School District covers the schools on the far east-side of Palmdale and its eastern suburbs. This school district has six schools and nearly 3,000 students for K–8 education.
- The Antelope Valley Union High School District covers nearly all of the 9th–12th grade education for the entire metropolitan area, with the exception of private high schools. It has 12 schools with over 25,000 students.
- The Palmdale Aerospace Academy is a joint venture between the city of Palmdale, the AERO Institute, and the Palmdale School District. It is a new independent charter school which opened in August 2012.
- Paraclete High School is a private high school that serves the greater Antelope Valley, including Palmdale.

=== Colleges and universities ===
- The Antelope Valley Community College District currently has a satellite campus in Palmdale with a student population of about 470. This temporary campus was set up until a permanent community college campus could be established within the city, which is being planned for the southside of the city on 25th Street East, south of Avenue S. The district has one full service campus in nearby Lancaster with about 14,000 students.
- The California State University system also has a satellite campus from its Bakersfield facility in nearby Lancaster at the Antelope Valley College main campus.
- DeVry University has a campus in Palmdale that includes its Keller Graduate School of Management.
- Brandman University has a satellite campus in Palmdale.
- University of Antelope Valley (private 4yr college)
- University of La Verne has a satellite campus in Palmdale.
- University of Phoenix has a satellite campus in nearby Lancaster.
- The AERO Institute at the Palmdale Institute of Technology is a facility in Palmdale at the Civic Center. It is operated by the National Aeronautics and Space Administration (NASA), and the City of Palmdale, and distance learning through a number of universities is available including Purdue, USC, University of San Diego, Pepperdine University, Embry-Riddle Aeronautical University, Caltech and Cal Poly Pomona. This specialized school offers graduate and undergraduate education in aerospace science, engineering, and technical skills.

== Media ==
=== Newspapers ===
- Antelope Valley Press
- The Antelope Valley Times
- Aerotech News and Review
- AV Political Observer
- El Sol Del Desierto

=== Online newszine ===
Antelope Valley New Press

www.thepalmdalejournal.com

=== Radio stations ===
==== AM ====
- KAVL 610 AM Sports
- KTPI 1340 AM Adult Standards
- KOSS 1380 AM News/Talk
- KUTY 1470 AM Spanish Oldies

==== FM ====
- KCRY 88.1 FM NPR (KCRW Santa Monica)
- KTLW 88.9 FM Religious/Christian
- KLXP 89.7 FM Religious/Christian (simulcast of Hollister KHRI 90.7)
- K211EY 90.1 FM Religious/Christian (simulcast of Victorville KHMS 88.5)
- K216FA 91.1 FM Religious/Christian (simulcast of Twin Falls KAWZ 89.9)
- KWTD 91.9 FM Religious/Christian (simulcast of Bishop KWTW 88.5)
- KQAV 93.5 FM Classic Rock
- KTPI-FM 97.7 FM Country
- KKZQ 100.1 FM Modern Rock
- KSRY 103.1 FM Modern Rock (simulcast of Los Angeles KYSR 98.7)
- KGBB 103.9 FM Adult Hits
- KEPD 104.9 FM Country
- KVVS 105.5 FM Top 40 (simulcast of Los Angeles KIIS 102.7)
- KGMX 106.3 FM Adult Contemporary
- KMVE 106.9 FM Regional Spanish

=== Television stations ===
- TW Cable 3 Local Events / News
- Palmdale 27 City's cable information channel
- KPAL-LP 38 Home Shopping / Local Events

== Transportation ==
According to the U.S. Census report released in September 2009, Palmdale has the longest average commute time in the United States at 41.5 minutes. This commute time exceeds that of even New York City. this is due to the majority of citizens commuting to nearby Santa Clarita and farther south to Los Angeles.

=== Airport ===
The LA/Palmdale Regional Airport/Air Force Plant 42 (PMD) has two runways, each over 2.25 miles (3.62 km) in length, although there is currently no commercial airline service at the airport. PMD's commercial terminal is owned and operated by Los Angeles World Airports (LAWA), a municipal department of the City of Los Angeles, on leased land from the U.S. Air Force. Airline service has been sporadic since commercial flights were first offered in 1971. Most recently, United Express/SkyWest Airlines flew between PMD and San Francisco from June 7, 2007, to December 6, 2008. The city of Palmdale formed the Palmdale Airport Authority to move forward to control the facilities and the lease with the USAF, to better develop regional air service in the High Desert.

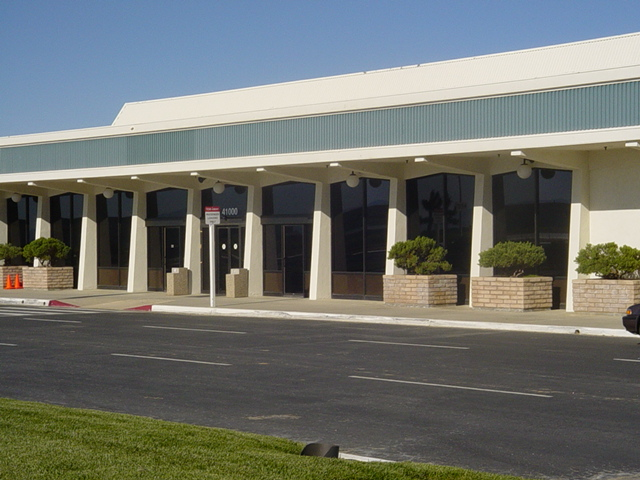
LA/Palmdale Regional Airport Terminal

LAWA also owns 17,500 acres (71 km^{2}) of land adjacent to the existing airport. The land was acquired between 1970 and 1983 to be developed into "Palmdale Intercontinental Airport", intended to surpass the air traffic of LAX. The land remains undeveloped. LAWA is currently developing a Master Plan for Palmdale that will guide airport land use and development decisions through 2030.

The FAA's Los Angeles Air Route Traffic Control Center is located adjacent to the airport.

NASA has consolidated its research, environmental and training aircraft, support services and facilities at the Dryden Aircraft Operations Facility in Palmdale. From the oversized runway and the massive hangar located at Air Force Plant 42 Site 9, NASA conducts worldwide environmental research with its ER-2 (a U-2 variant) and cutting edge deep space imaging with the 747-based SOFIA infrared telescope.

=== Highways ===
The Antelope Valley Freeway (SR 14) is the major north–south highway connecting Palmdale to Los Angeles and Mojave.

State Route 138 (SR 138) is the major east–west highway connecting Palmdale to the Inland Empire and Frazier Park.

State Route 18 (SR 18) heads eastward out of the Antelope Valley connecting it to Victorville and via I-15 the Barstow area. This road is commonly used as a route to Las Vegas, Nevada.

=== Street system ===
The street system in the Antelope Valley is set out in a grid. Unless otherwise named or curved around due to terrain, east–west roads are called avenues and north–south roads are called streets. The city is essentially on a perfect grid, and the traffic signals are coordinated by a central processing facility at the Civic Center.

East–west avenues are lettered mile-by-mile from north to south, starting with Avenue A on the Los Angeles-Kern County line. One mile south of Avenue A is Avenue B, and so on. Smaller roads between major avenues carry suffixes "-1" (nearest to the lettered avenue) through "-15" (nearest to the next lettered avenue). Some "-8" avenues can be major thoroughfares, for example, Avenue R-8 is halfway between Avenue R and Avenue S.

North–south streets are numbered with an "east" or "west" suffix with respect to their distances from Division Street. The number increases by 10 for each mile, so a mile east and west of Division Street lie "10th Street East" and "10th Street West" respectively. Some streets like 5th or 15th can also be major thoroughfares.

House addresses on east–west "avenues" are numbered according to the "streets". For example, "2001 East Palmdale Boulevard" is just east of 20th Street East, and "6066 West Avenue M-2" is just west of 60th Street West on Avenue M-2, which is 2/16 of a mile south of Avenue M.

On north–south streets, numbers are counted from downtown Los Angeles (thus increase from south to north), and while in the Antelope Valley, the difference is 800 per mile. For example, Palmdale Boulevard (geographically "Avenue Q-8") is 38400, Avenue Q is 38800, Avenue P is 39600, and so on. "37200 25th Street East" would be at the corner of Avenue S.

In accordance with Los Angeles County standards, odd numbers are on west and north sides of the road, and even numbers are on east and south sides of the road.

Avenue M is the general border of the connected population between Palmdale and Lancaster. Avenue L is actually the longer border between the two cities, east of Challenger Way, but is not as heavily populated. Avenue M has recently been named Columbia Way out of respect for the astronauts on board the Space Shuttle Columbia that disintegrated on re-entry in 2003. 10th Street East north of Columbia Way was renamed Challenger Way in 1987, in honor of those lost in the Challenger Disaster. (All of the shuttles were built in Palmdale.)

=== Public transportation ===
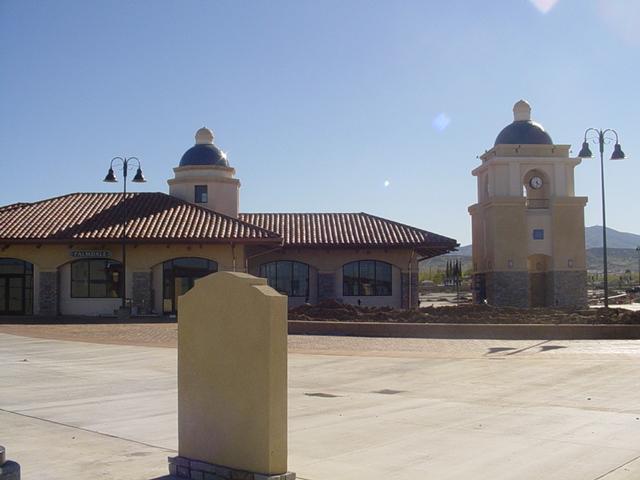
The Palmdale Transportation Center serves at the regional transit hub for the Antelope Valley.

The Palmdale Transportation Center, completed in March 2005, is the central mass transit center for the Antelope Valley. It serves as the transit hub for the Antelope Valley Transit Authority, the city's public bus system, as well as an Amtrak, Greyhound Bus, and commuter rail Metrolink station. The station is also designated a stop on the proposed California High-Speed Rail system and the proposed Orange Line Maglev rail from Irvine.

The High Desert Corridor along with current and planned future rail connections in Southern California.

In June 2025, a firm was chosen “by the High Desert Corridor Joint Powers Agency to deliver engineering and design services for a 54-mile (86.9km) rail segment of California’s high-speed rail project between Palmdale and Victorville.” The railway is expected to operate high speed trains at 180 miles per hour (289.6km/h).

== Sites of interest ==
- Dry Town Water Park on Avenue S, open each summer from May to September
- Joe Davies Heritage Airpark at Palmdale Plant 42 and next-door the Air Force Flight Test Center Museum's Blackbird Airpark Annex show off displays of various aircraft built or tested at Palmdale Air Force Plant 42
- Mershops Antelope Valley More than a million square feet of shopping space with chain stores.

== ZIP Codes ==
The Palmdale vicinity currently has a total of ten ZIP Codes:

- 93536: Most of Quartz Hill (district and adjacent town). Shared with cities and towns of Lancaster (westside), Neenach, Del Sur, and Antelope Acres.
- 93543: Parts of Sun Village. Shared with town of Littlerock.
- 93550: Downtown Palmdale Civic Center, Harold, Vincent-Grade, and Barrel Springs.
- 93551: Palmdale Central City, Anaverde, Rancho Vista, Desert-View Highlands, Portal Ridge, Leona Valley (district and adjacent town), and parts of Quartz Hill (district). Some P.O. boxes.
- 93552: Pearland, parts of Palmdale East, and parts of Sun Village.
- 93553: Parts of Sun Village. Shared with town of Pearblossom. Some P.O. boxes.
- 93590: Palmdale Regional Airport, USAF Plant 42, and some of Palmdale's P.O. boxes.
- 93591: Lake Los Angeles (district and adjacent town), parts of Palmdale East, and some P.O. boxes.
- 93592: Only P.O. Boxes
- 93599: Only P.O. Boxes

== In popular culture ==
Many Western films were filmed in Palmdale.

=== Music ===
- Britney Spears filmed a video in Palmdale for "Perfume".
- Avril Lavigne filmed a music video in Palmdale for her song Rock n Roll.

== Notable people ==
- Carlos Aguilar, soccer player and coach
- Eric Calvillo, soccer player
- Robert Castellanos, soccer player
- Steve Hofbauer, mayor
- Joseph Edgar Foreman, better known by his stage name Afroman, spent time at an early age in Palmdale, and sings about it in the song "Palmdale" off his 2001 album The Good Times.
- Paul George, professional basketball player for the Boston Celtics and previously for the Philadelphia 76ers, Los Angeles Clippers, Oklahoma City Thunder, and Indiana Pacers.
- William (Pete) Knight, test pilot, astronaut, and politician who served as Palmdale's first mayor
- Randy Kutcher, baseball player
- Wesley Low, professional bowler
- Alyssa Miller, model
- Debbie Rowe
- R. Rex Parris, politician
- Michael Tonkin, baseball pitcher
- John Wayne, actor

== Sister cities ==
Palmdale has one sister city:

- Poncitlán, Jalisco, Mexico

== See also ==
- List of cities in Los Angeles County, California
- List of cities and towns in California
- List of largest cities on the United States West Coast
- List of cities in the Mojave Desert
