= WEL =

WEL or Wel may refer to:

== Places ==
- Wel, a river in Poland
- Wel, a tributary of the Bhima River in India
- Wel Landscape Park, Działdowo County, Warmian-Masurian Voivodeship, Poland
- West End, London (WEL), England, UK

=== Facilities and structures ===
- Welch Hall (University of Texas at Austin), abbreviated as "WEL"
- Tokyo Kōsei Nenkin Kaikan (also called Wel City), a concert hall in Tokyo, Japan
- Wellingborough railway station (station code WEL), Northamptonshire, England

== People ==
- Master Wel (1943–2002), U.S. composer and playwright
- Arend van der Wel (1933–2013), Dutch soccer player
- Clara van Wel (born 1997), New Zealand singer-songwriter
- Dominique Wel (born 1997), New Caledonian soccer player
- Gerardus van der Wel (1895–1945), Dutch long distance runner
- Isis van der Wel (born 1975, stagename DJ Isis), Dutch DJ

== Groups, organizations, companies ==
- Women's Electoral Lobby (disambiguation), several feminist lobby groups
- WEL Networks, (formerly "Waikato Electricity Limited"), an electric distribution company in Waikato, New Zealand
- Welspun Energy Limited (WEL), an Indian power company
- Weybridge Ladies Amateur Rowing Club (British Rowing code WEL)
- Weymann-Lepère (abbreviated "WEL"), a French aircraft company
- Veles: Ukrainian Aviation Company (ICAO airline code WEL)

== Other uses ==
- Welsh language (ISO 639 language code: wel)
- Welteislehre (abbreviated as "WEL"), aa cosmological theory proposed by Austrian Hans Hörbige

== See also ==
- WELE
- Weles
- Well (disambiguation)
- Welle (disambiguation)
- Wels (disambiguation)
- Wells (disambiguation)
- Welles (disambiguation)
