= H. G. Wells (disambiguation) =

H. G. Wells (1866–1946) was an English author.

H. G. Wells may also refer to:

== Places ==
- H. G. Wells (crater), a lunar crater

== People and characters ==
- Henry Gordon Wells (1879–1954), American lawyer and politician

=== Characters ===
- Helena G. Wells, a character on Warehouse 13
- H. G. Wells, a St. Bernard dog in the sit-com Father, Dear Father

== Other uses ==
- H. G. Wells: War with the World, a 2006 BBC Television docudrama
- H.G. Wells: Early Writings in Science and Science Fiction (book), a 1975 collection
- RSS H.G. Wells, a Blue Origin space capsule for New Shepard

== See also ==
- H. G. Wells Society, organizations supporting the ideas of H. G. Wells
- H. G. Welles, a fictional character from Cataclysmo and the Time Boys
- Wells (disambiguation)
- Welles (disambiguation)
- Welle (disambiguation)
- Well (disambiguation)
