= Tower Peak (California) =

Mountain in the United States

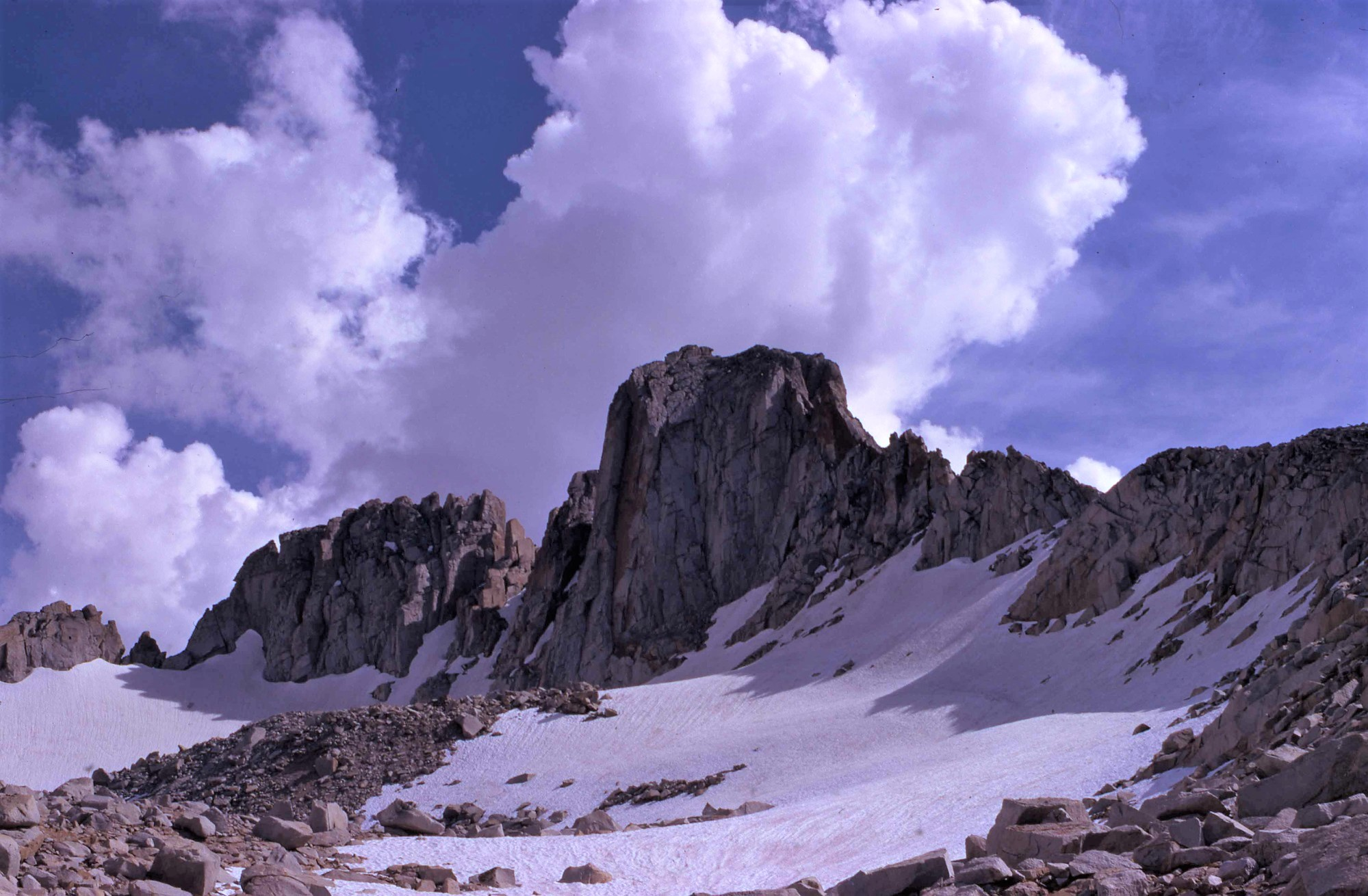
- North aspect

Highest point
- Elevation: 11,755 ft (3,583 m)
- Prominence: 2,183 ft (665 m)
- Isolation: 7.95 mi (12.79 km)
- Listing: Sierra Peaks Section
- Coordinates: 38°08′40″N 119°32′52″W

Geography
- Location within California Location within the United States
- Location: Mono and Tuolumne County, California, U.S.
- Parent range: Sierra Nevada
- Topo map: USGS Tower Peak

Climbing
- Easiest route: class 3

Tower Peak is a mountain in the Sierra Nevada of Mono and Tuolumne County, California.

To the south of the summit is Yosemite National Park and to the north is the Hoover Wilderness. Mary Lake is to the west, Ehrnbeck Peak and Hawksbeak Peak to the east. To the south are Wells Peak and Craig Peak. The next higher mountain is Eagle Peak, about 8 mi east-northeast.

== Climate ==
Tower Peak is located in an alpine climate zone. Most weather fronts originate in the Pacific Ocean, and travel east toward the Sierra Nevada mountains. As fronts approach, they are forced upward by the peaks (orographic lift), causing them to drop their moisture in the form of rain or snowfall onto the range.

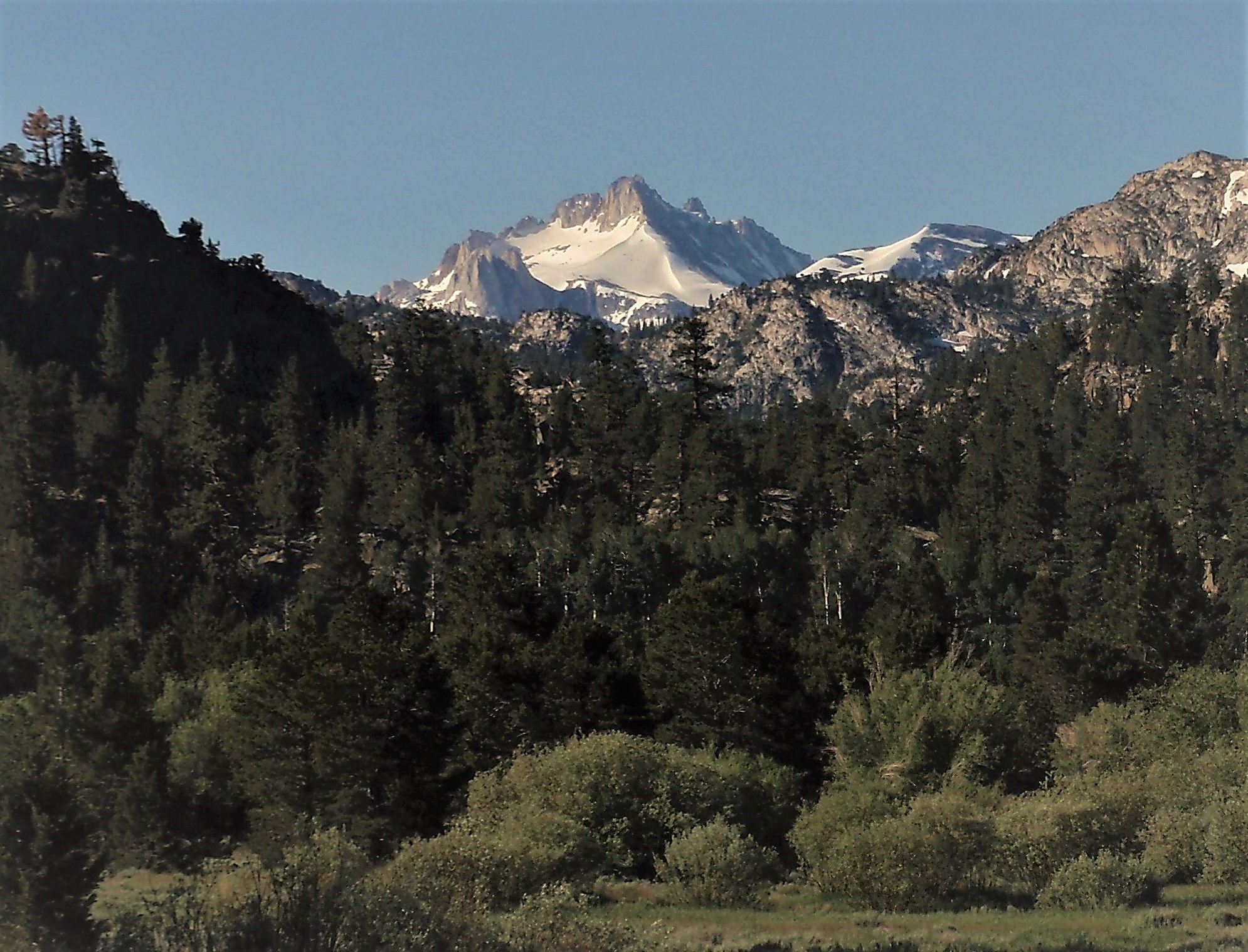
Tower Peak from Leavitt Meadow
