= Wells =

Wells most commonly refers to:

- Wells, Somerset, a cathedral city in Somerset, England
- Well, an excavation or structure created in the ground
- Wells (name)

Wells may also refer to:

== Places ==
=== Canada ===
- Wells, British Columbia

=== England ===
- Wells (Priory Road) railway station was a railway station in Wells, Somerset
- Wells (Tucker Street) railway station was a railway station in Wells, Somerset
- Wells (UK Parliament constituency), the UK parliamentary constituency in which the city of Wells, Somerset, is located
- Wells-next-the-Sea, town and port in Norfolk
  - Wells-on-Sea railway station was a railway station in Wells-next-the-Sea

=== Scotland ===
- Wells, Roxburghshire, a Scottish barony

=== United States ===
- Wells, California, former name of Keene, California
- Wells Peak
- Wells, Indiana
- Wells, Kansas
- Wells, Maine
- Wells, Minnesota
- Wells, Mississippi
- Wells, Nevada
- Wells, New York, a town
  - Wells (CDP), New York, a census-designated place in the town
- Wells, Texas
- Wells, Vermont, a New England town
  - Wells (CDP), Vermont, the main village in the town
- Wells, West Virginia
- Wells, Wisconsin, a town
- Wells, Manitowoc County, Wisconsin, an unincorporated community
- Wells County (disambiguation)
- Wells Island, West Virginia
- Wells Township (disambiguation)

== People ==
- Wells baronets, a member of the Order of Baronets with the surname Wells
- Bishop of Bath and Wells

== Other uses ==
- Charles Wells Ltd, a vertically integrated British regional brewer
- HMS Wells (I95), a British naval fighting ship
- Struell Wells, a set of four holy wells in Struell, Northern Ireland
- Wells and Fakenham Railway was a railway line in Norfolk, England
- Wells Cathedral, in Wells, Somerset
- Wells City F.C., a football club based in Wells, Somerset
- Wells College, a liberal arts college in New York
- Wells Fargo, an American bank
- Wells light, a large oil-fuelled blowlamp
- Wells notice, a notification of enforcement by the U.S. Securities and Exchange Commission
- Wells Regional Transportation Center is a train and bus station in Wells, Maine
- Wells score, one of two prediction rules in clinical medicine
- Wells turbine, a low-pressure air turbine
- 1721 Wells, an asteroid
- Wells (crater), an impact crater on Mars
- Wells Vertige, a British sports car
- Wells American, formerly Intertec Data Systems, a defunct American computer company

== See also ==
- Justice Wells (disambiguation)
- Well (disambiguation)
- Welles (disambiguation)
- Wels (disambiguation)
