= Tower Peak =

Tower Peak may refer to:

- Tower Peak (Antarctica) in Graham Land, Antarctica
- Tower Peak (British Columbia) in the Beaverfoot Range, British Columbia, Canada
- Tower Peak (California) in California, United States
- Tower Peak (Montana) in Montana, Canada
- Tower Peak (Yukon) in Yukon, Canada
