= Wells Township, Michigan =

Wells Township may refer to places in the U.S. state of Michigan:

- Wells Township, Delta County, Michigan
- Wells Township, Marquette County, Michigan
- Wells Township, Tuscola County, Michigan

Wells may refer to

- Wells, Michigan, an unincorporated community in Delta County
- A former station on the Michigan Central Railroad in Arenac County, that was south of Alger, Michigan

== See also ==
- Wells State Park (Michigan)
- Wellston, Michigan
- Wells Township (disambiguation)
