= VHA =

VHA may refer to for:

- Veterans Health Administration, a sub-department of the United States Department of Veterans Affairs
- Vodafone Hutchison Australia, a company formed in 2009 by the merger of Vodafone Australia and Hutchison 3G Australia
- VHA, Inc., an American healthcare supply chain company, one of the predecessors of Vizient, Inc.
- VHA, airline code of VH-Air Industrie, an Angolan airline
- Vancouver Hebrew Academy, a Canadian orthodox Jewish school
