= The Well =

The Well may refer to:

== Titled works ==
- "The Well" (Agents of S.H.I.E.L.D.), a 2013 television episode of Agents of S.H.I.E.L.D.
- The Well (novel), 1986 novel by Elizabeth Jolley
- The Well (TV series), UK TV series
- "The Well" (The Walking Dead), a 2016 television episode of The Walking Dead
- The Well, a 1967 novel by Chaim Grade
- The Well (video game), a 2021 horror game
- "The Well", an episode of Strange Experiences
- "The Well" (Doctor Who), an episode of the 2025 season of Doctor Who

=== Music ===
- The Well (Jennifer Warnes album), 2001
- The Well (Waking Ashland album), 2007
- The Well (Charlie Musselwhite album), 2010
- The Well (Tord Gustavsen album), 2012
- "The Well", a 2011 song by Casting Crowns from Come to the Well
- "The Well", a 1978 song by The Band from The Last Waltz
- "The Well", a 2018 song by Trixie Mattel from One Stone

=== Films ===
- The Well (1913 film), American
- The Well (1951 film), American
- The Well (1991 film), Bulgarian
- The Well (1997 film), Australian
- The Well (2010 film), Indian
- The Well (2013 film), Mexican
- The Well (2015 film), Algerian
- The Well (2023 film), Italian
- The Well (2025 film), Canadian

== Other ==
- The WELL (The Whole Earth 'Lectronic Link), an online community
- Motherwell F.C., or The Well, a Scottish football club

== See also ==
- Well (disambiguation)
