= MVY (disambiguation) =

MVY is the IATA airport code for Martha's Vineyard Airport.

MVY may also refer to:

- Martha's Vineyard, generally
- VIM-Aviaservice, ICAO airline code: MVY
- Maiya language, ISO 639 language code: mvy
