= FXF =

FXF may refer to:

- FX Fighter, 1995 video game
- FXF, ICAO airline code for American airline VIP Air Charter
- FXF Productions, producer of Trombone Shorty's eponymous film
