= WELS (disambiguation) =

WELS is an acronym for Wisconsin Evangelical Lutheran Synod.

WELS may also refer to:

- WELS-FM, a radio station (102.9 FM) licensed to Kinston, North Carolina, United States
- WWMC, a radio station (1010 AM) licensed to Kinston, North Carolina, which held the call sign WELS until 2015
- "West of the Easterly Line of the State", a term of survey township in the US state of Maine
- WELS rating

== See also ==
- Wels (disambiguation)
