= Hunewill Peak =

Mountain in California, United States

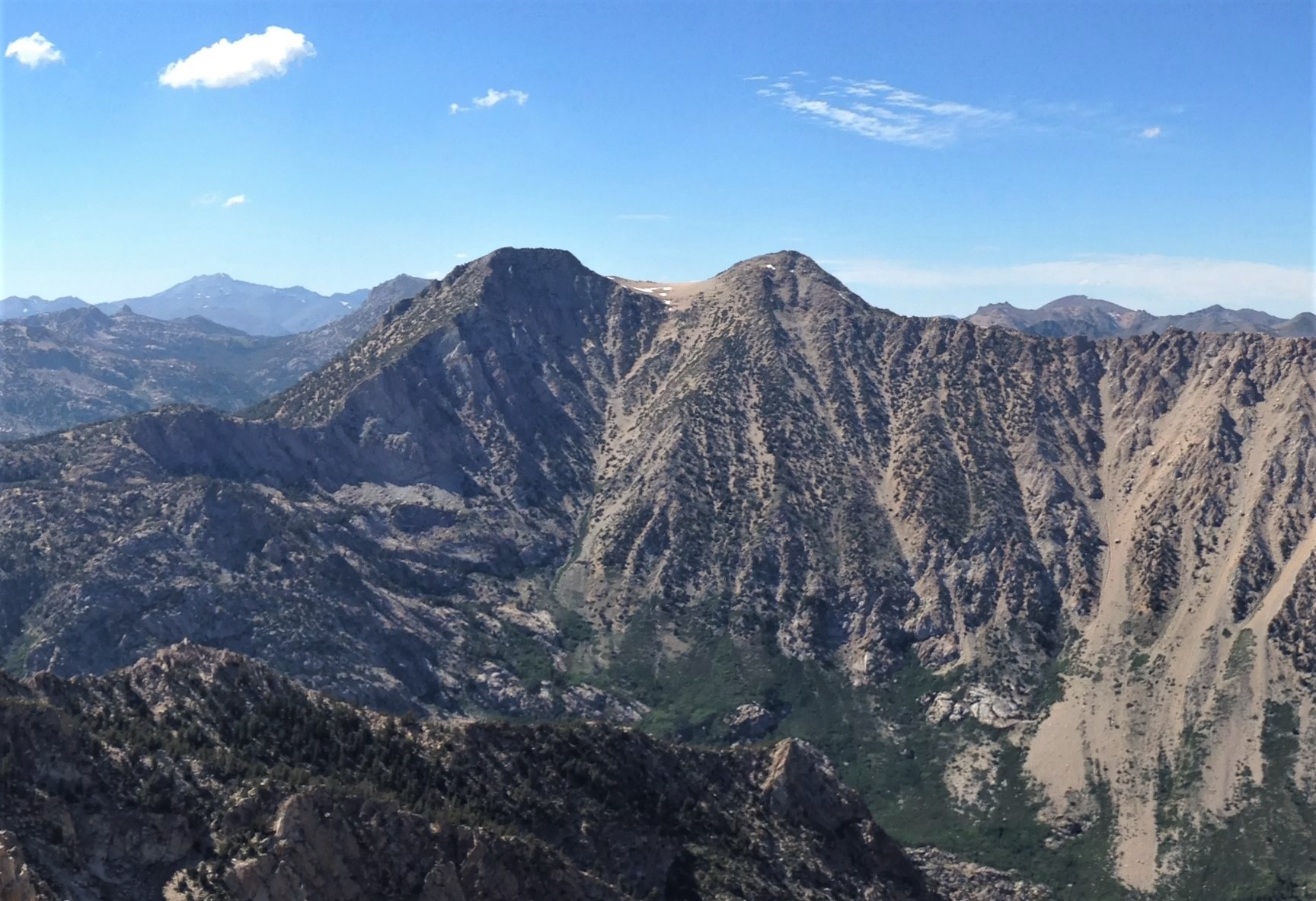
- Southeast aspect, from The Incredible Hulk

Highest point
- Elevation: 11,713 ft (3,570 m)
- Prominence: 753 ft (230 m)
- Parent peak: Eagle Peak (11,847 ft)
- Isolation: 2.39 mi (3.85 km)
- Coordinates: 38°09′32″N 119°26′36″W

Naming
- Etymology: N. B. Hunewill (1828–1908)

Geography
- Location within California Location within the United States
- Location: Mono County, California, U.S.
- Parent range: Sierra Nevada
- Topo map: USGS Buckeye Ridge

Geology
- Mountain type: Fault block

Climbing
- First ascent: 1946
- Easiest route: class 2 hiking via Barney Lake

Hunewill Peak is a mountain with a summit elevation of 11,713 feet (3,570 m) located in the Sierra Nevada mountain range, in Mono County of northern California, United States. The summit is set in Hoover Wilderness on land managed by Humboldt–Toiyabe National Forest. The peak is situated approximately four miles west of Twin Lakes, 1.3 mile southwest of Victoria Peak, and 2.4 miles southwest of line parent Eagle Peak. Precipitation runoff from this mountain drains into tributaries of Robinson and Buckeye Creeks, which are within the Walker River drainage basin. Topographic relief is significant as the summit rises over 3,500 feet (1,100 meters) above Robinson Creek in approximately one mile (1.6 km).

== History ==
Hunewill Peak is the toponym officially adopted in 1962 by the U.S. Board on Geographic Names to remember Napoleon Bonaparte "N. B." Hunewill (1828–1908), a pioneer who operated the Eagle Creek Lumber Mill in this area in the 1860s and supplied timber to build the mining town of Bodie.

The first ascent of the summit was made in 1946 by Ken Crowley, R. Dickey Jr., Ken Hargreaves, and H. Watty.

== Climate ==
According to the Köppen climate classification system, Hunewill Peak is located in an alpine climate zone. Most weather fronts originate in the Pacific Ocean, and travel east toward the Sierra Nevada mountains. As fronts approach, they are forced upward by the peaks (orographic lift), causing moisture in the form of rain or snowfall to drop onto the range.

== See also ==
- List of mountain peaks of California

== Gallery ==
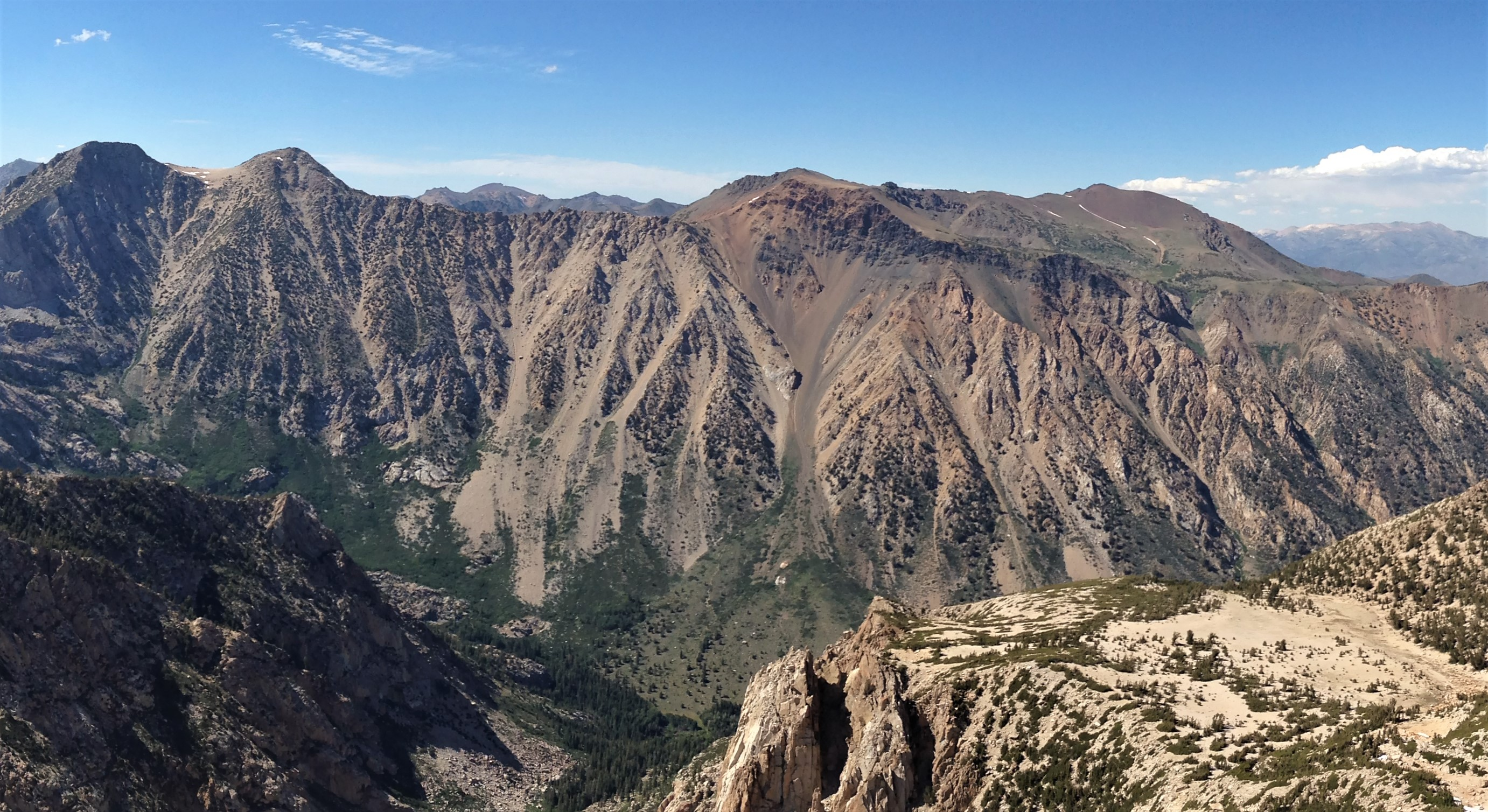
Hunewill Peak (left), Victoria Peak (centered), Eagle Peak (right).
View looking north from The Incredible Hulk.

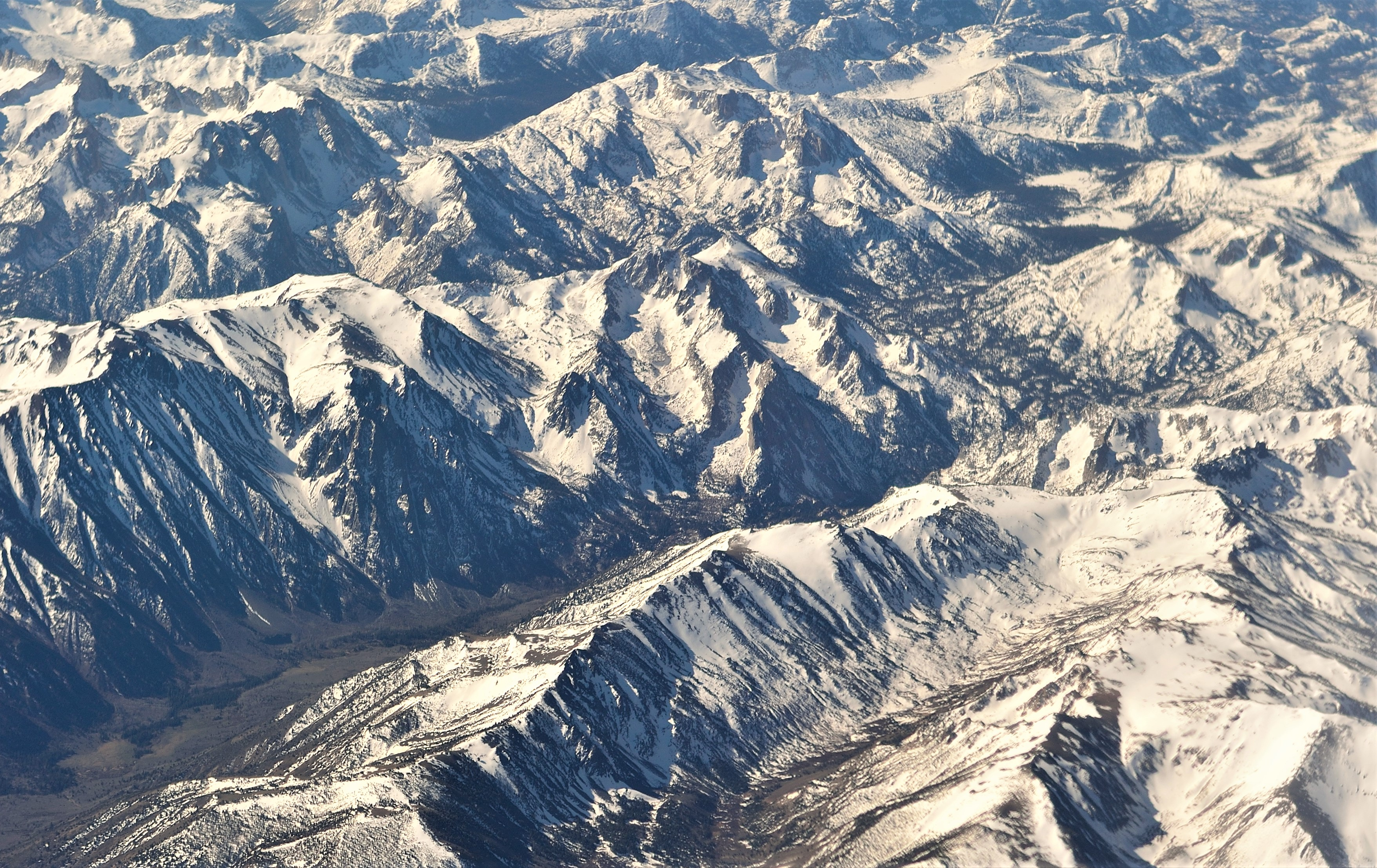
Aerial view of north aspect of Hunewill Peak (centered).
Buckeye Creek Canyon in lower left.
