= Apostolic Prefecture of Welle =

The Apostolic Prefecture (or Prefecture Apostolic) of Welle was a Roman Catholic missionary pre-diocesan jurisdiction, located in the extreme north of Belgian Congo, Central Africa.

== History ==
The Apostolic Prefecture was separated by a Decree of the Propaganda Fide on 12 May, 1898, from the Apostolic Vicariate of the Congo Free State, and committed to the care of the Canons Regular Premonstratensian of Tongerloo, Belgium. Its limits were on the north the Apostolic Vicariate of Central Africa or Sudan; on the east the Apostolic Vicariate of Northern Victoria Nyanza; on the west a line drawn from the junction of the Rivers Uele and Ubanghi to the confluence of the Itimbri and the Congo stream; on the south the watershed of the southern tributaries of the Itimbri, eastwards to the 30° east longitude. By a decree of 16 June, 1910, the northern boundary was extended so as to include a portion of the Vicariate Apostolic of the Sudan and now along the river Bomer and the watershed of the Nile and the Congo to where it crosses the 4° southern latitude.

More than 20 dialects or languages were spoken in the prefecture; the missionaries used the Bangala tongue.

=== Ordinaries ===
The first apostolic prefect, Leo Derikx, was born at Neerpelt, Belgium, 20 July, 1860, entered the Premonstratensian novitiate on 8 October, 1878; was professed, 8 May, 1882; ordained, 20 December, 1884; and appointed apostolic prefect in 1898. He resided at Imbembo in the south-western portion of the prefecture.
