= Wellness =

Wellness may refer to:

- Health
- Well-being, psychological wellness
- Wellness (alternative medicine)
- Workplace wellness
- Wellness tourism
- Eudaimonia, wellness in ancient philosophy

== Other uses ==
- Wellness (pet food), a brand of dog and cat food sold by the company WellPet
- Wellness (album), the 2015 studio album by band Last Dinosaurs

For wellness center see:

- Health club
- Sauna

== See also ==
- Well (disambiguation)
