= Victoria Peak (California) =

Mountain in California, United States

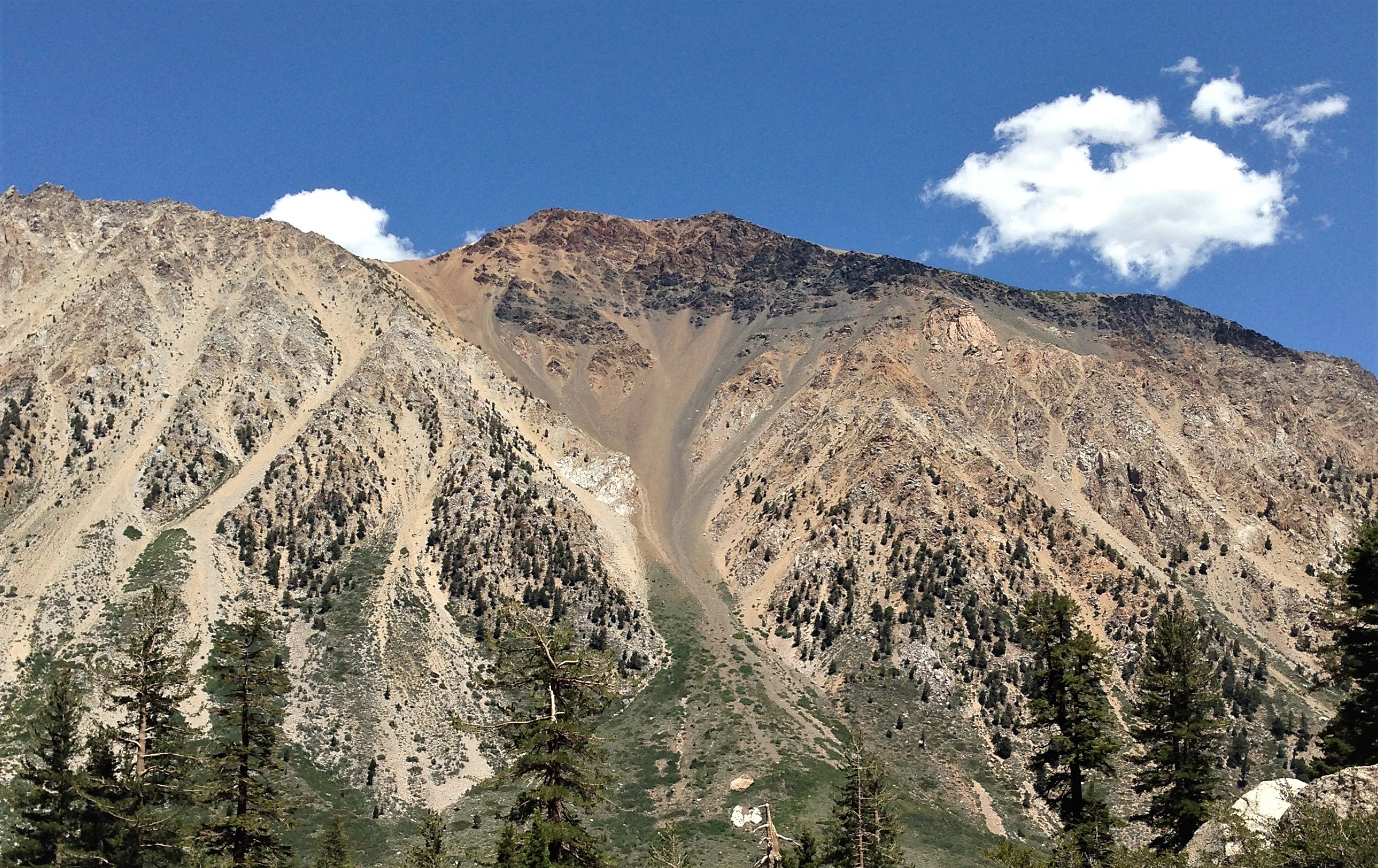
- South aspect, from Little Slide Canyon

Highest point
- Elevation: 11,732 ft (3,576 m)
- Prominence: 212 ft (65 m)
- Parent peak: Eagle Peak (11,847 ft)
- Isolation: 1.16 mi (1.87 km)
- Coordinates: 38°10′05″N 119°25′25″W

Geography
- Location within California Location within the United States
- Location: Mono County, California, U.S.
- Parent range: Sierra Nevada
- Topo map: USGS Buckeye Ridge

Geology
- Mountain type: Fault block

Climbing
- First ascent: 1946
- Easiest route: class 2 hiking

Victoria Peak is a mountain with a summit elevation of 11,732 feet (3,576 m) located in the Sierra Nevada mountain range, in Mono County of northern California, United States. The summit is set in Hoover Wilderness on land managed by Humboldt–Toiyabe National Forest. The peak is situated approximately three miles west-northwest of Twin Lakes, three miles north of Kettle Peak, 1.3 mile northeast of Hunewill Peak, and one mile southwest of line parent Eagle Peak. Precipitation runoff from this mountain drains into tributaries of Robinson and Buckeye Creeks, which are within the Walker River drainage basin. Topographic relief is significant as the summit rises over 3,900 feet (1,200 meters) above Robinson Creek in approximately one mile (1.6 km). The first ascent of the summit was made September 8, 1946, by A. J. Reyman.

== Climate ==
According to the Köppen climate classification system, Victoria Peak is located in an alpine climate zone. Most weather fronts originate in the Pacific Ocean, and travel east toward the Sierra Nevada mountains. As fronts approach, they are forced upward by the peaks, causing moisture in the form of rain or snowfall to drop onto the range (orographic lift).

== See also ==
- Robinson Peak
- List of mountain peaks of California

== Gallery ==
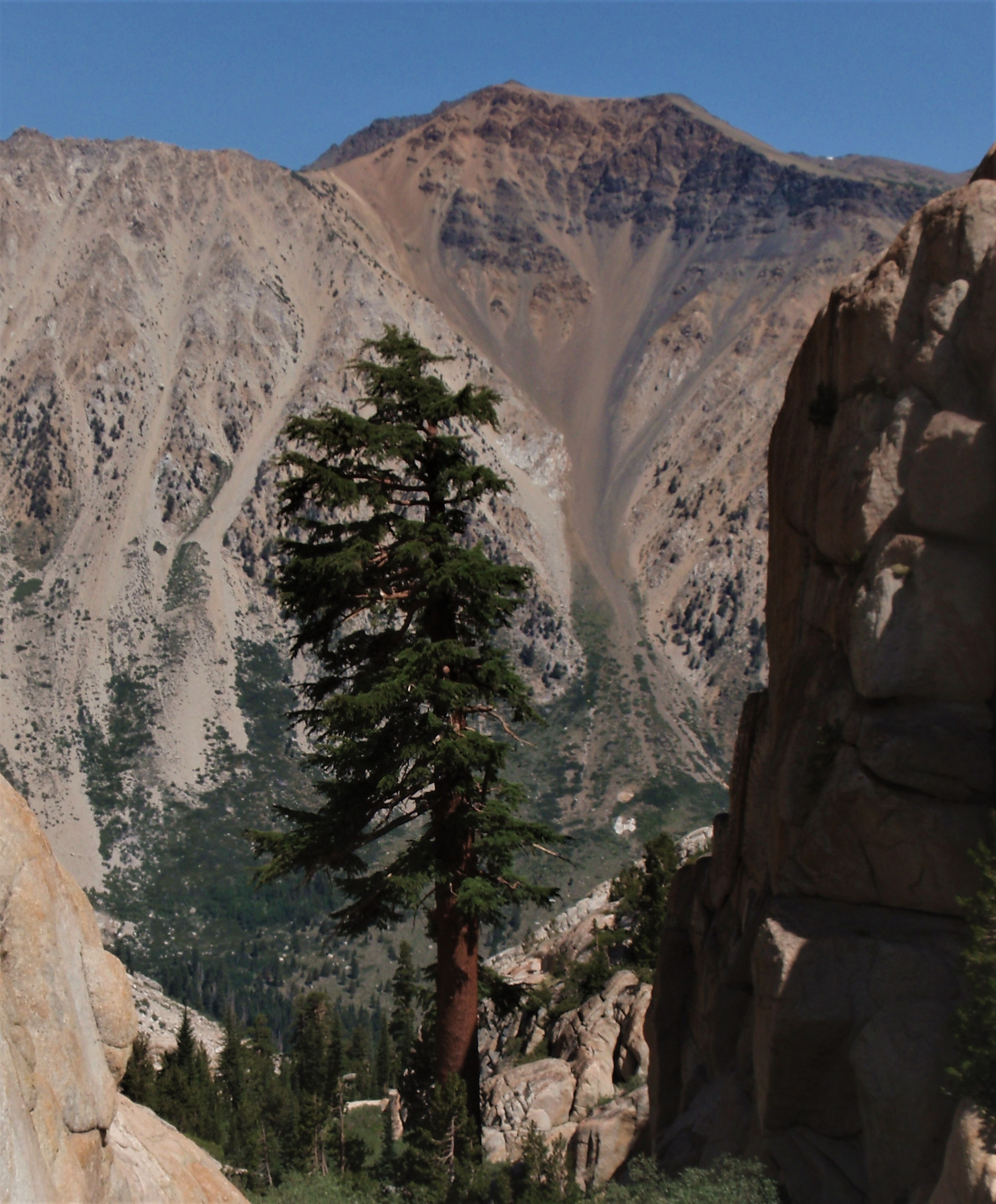
Victoria Peak, from Little Slide Canyon

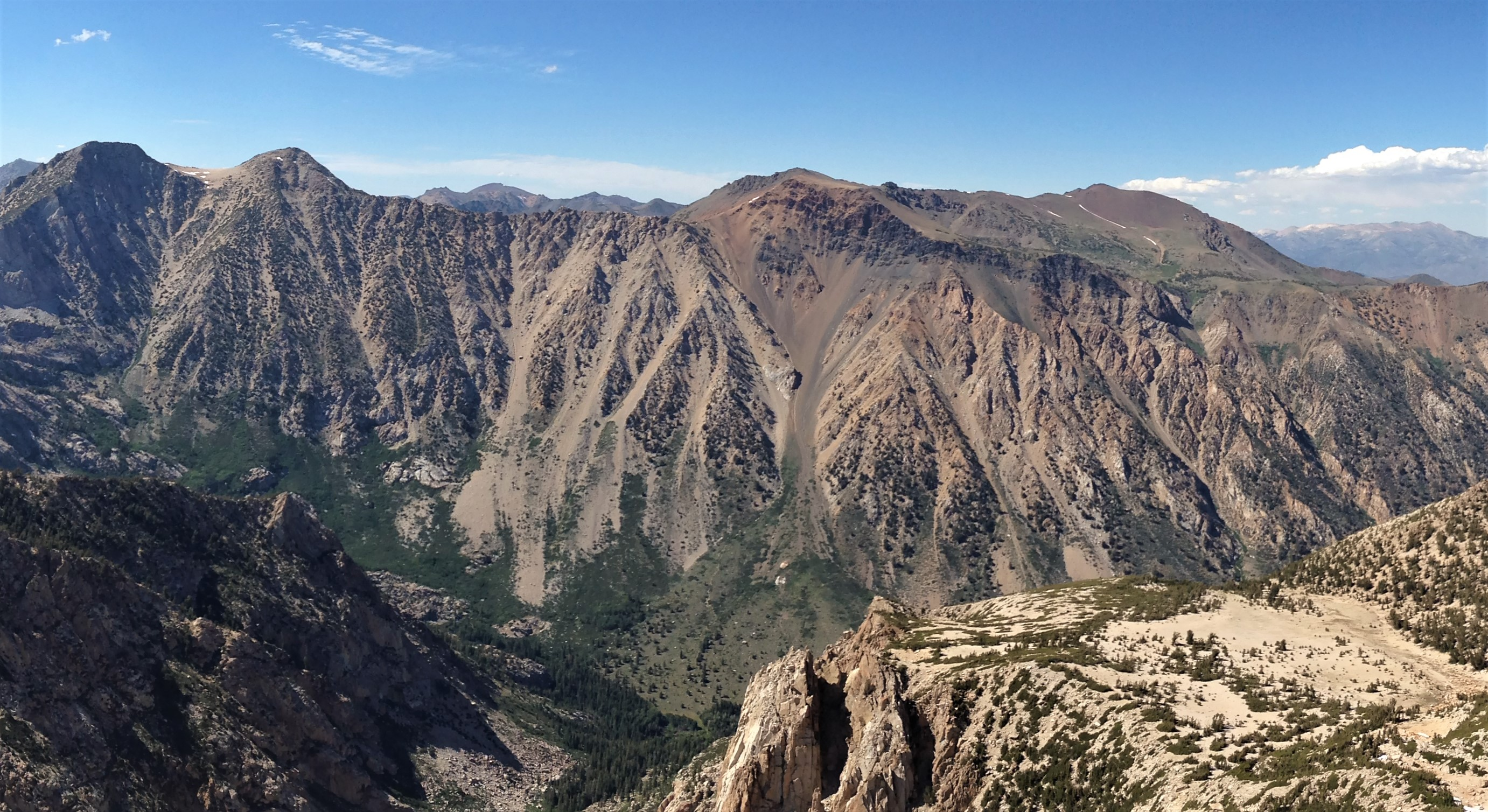
Hunewill Peak (left), Victoria Peak (center), Eagle Peak (right).
View looking north from The Incredible Hulk.

Victoria Peak on the right, darker color.

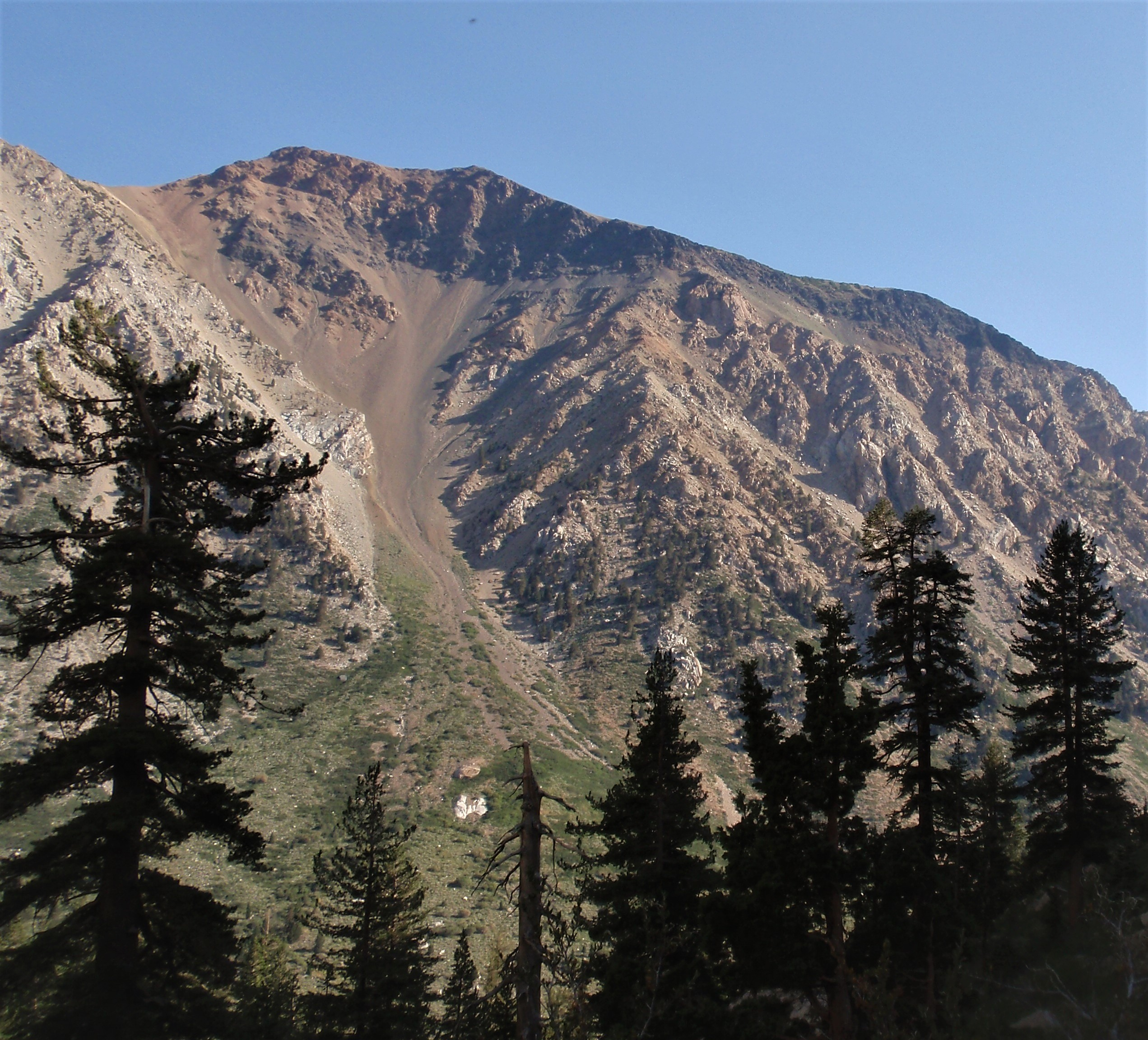

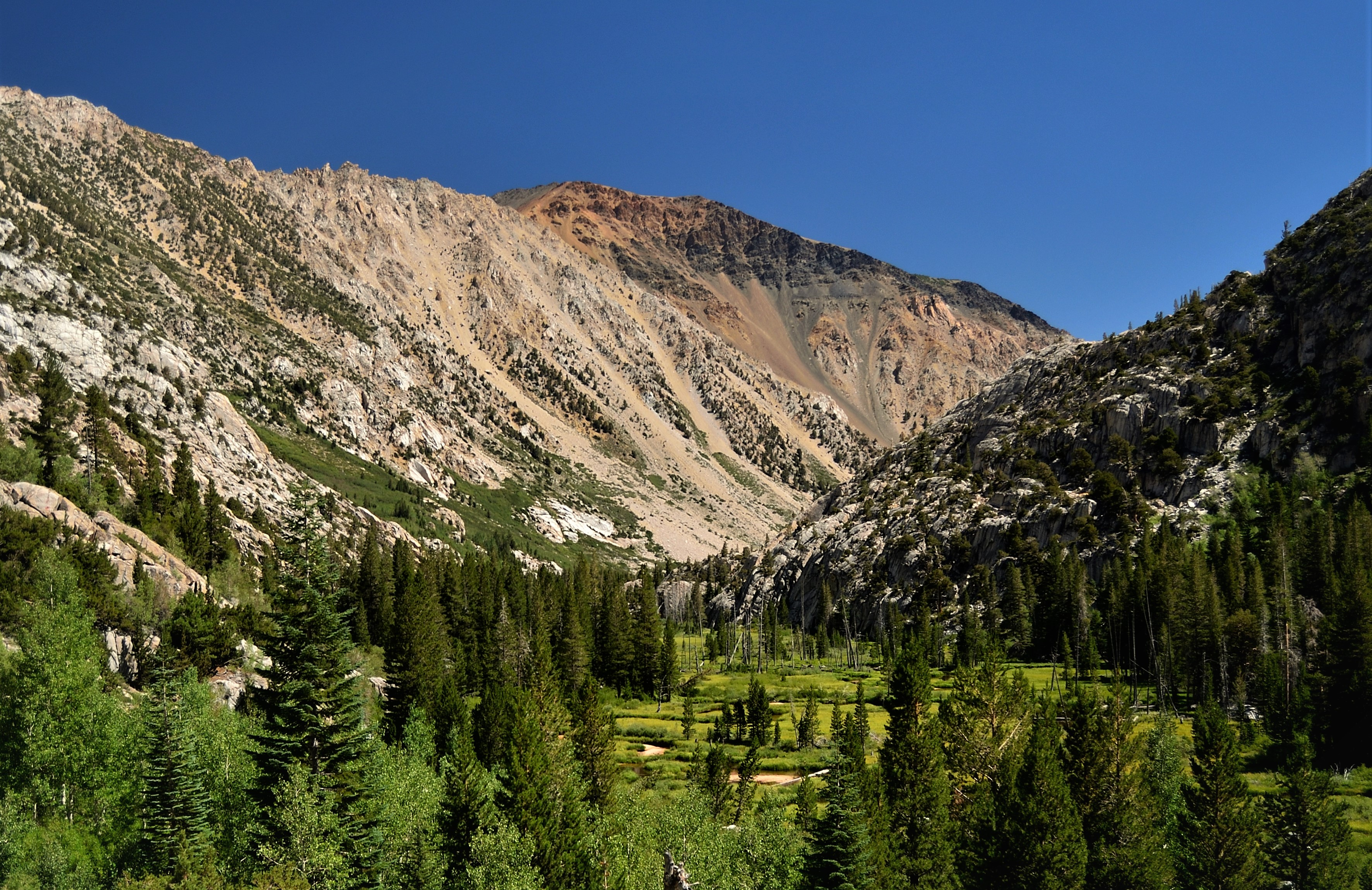
Southwest aspect
