= WELL =

WELL may refer to:

- WELL-FM, a radio station (88.7 FM) licensed to Waverly, Alabama, United States
- WELL-LD, a low-power television station (channel 29, virtual 45) licensed to Philadelphia, Pennsylvania, United States
- The WELL, an online virtual community
- Well equidistributed long-period linear, a pseudorandom number generator

== See also ==
- Well (disambiguation)
