= Bozer =

Bozer is a Turkish surname. Notable people with the surname include:

- Ahmet Bozer (born 1960), Turkish business executive
- Ali Bozer (1925–2020), Turkish academic and politician
- Hasan Bozer (born 1944), Turkish politician

== See also ==
- Bomer
