= Robinson Peak (California) =

Mountain in the American state of California

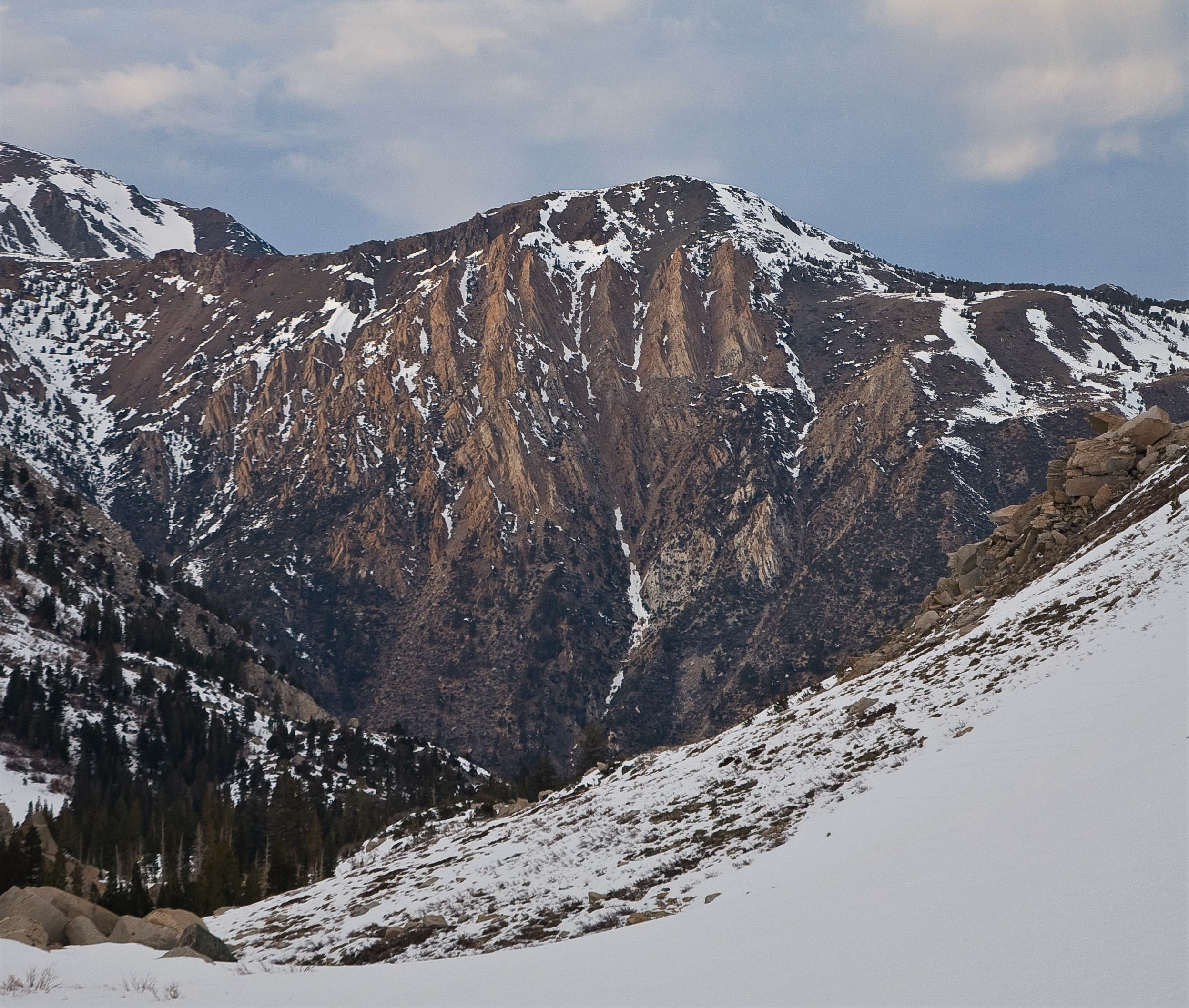
- South aspect

Highest point
- Elevation: 10,793 ft (3,290 m)
- Prominence: 393 ft (120 m)
- Parent peak: Eagle Peak (11,847 ft)
- Isolation: 1.55 mi (2.49 km)
- Coordinates: 38°09′57″N 119°23′11″W

Naming
- Etymology: Moses Robinson

Geography
- Location within California Location within the United States
- Location: Mono County, California, U.S.
- Parent range: Sierra Nevada
- Topo map: USGS Buckeye Ridge

Geology
- Mountain type: Fault block

Climbing
- Easiest route: class 2 North slope

Robinson Peak is a mountain with an elevation of 10,793 feet (3,290 m) located in the Sierra Nevada mountain range, in Mono County of northern California, United States. The summit is situated on the boundary of Hoover Wilderness, on land managed by Humboldt–Toiyabe National Forest. The peak is set above the west end of Twin Lakes, two miles east of Victoria Peak, and 1.5 mile southeast of line parent Eagle Peak. Precipitation runoff from this mountain drains into tributaries of Robinson and Buckeye Creeks, which are within the Walker River drainage basin. Topographic relief is significant as the summit rises approximately 3,700 feet (1,100 meters) above Robinson Creek in 1.5 mile.

== History ==
The peak is named in association with Robinson Creek, which in turn is named for Moses Robinson, an early pioneer who operated a sawmill there in the 1860s. The toponym has been officially adopted by the United States Board on Geographic Names.

The first ascent of the summit was likely made by the 1905–09 USGS survey team of George Davis, A. H. Sylvester, and Pearson Chapman, but the first documented ascent was made August 22, 1946, by K. Hargreaves, H. F. Watty, R. F. Dickey, Jr., and Ken Crowley.

== Climate ==
According to the Köppen climate classification system, Robinson Peak is located in an alpine climate zone. Most weather fronts originate in the Pacific Ocean, and travel east toward the Sierra Nevada mountains. As fronts approach, they are forced upward by the peaks (orographic lift), causing moisture in the form of rain or snowfall to drop onto the range.

== See also ==
- List of mountain peaks of California

== Gallery ==
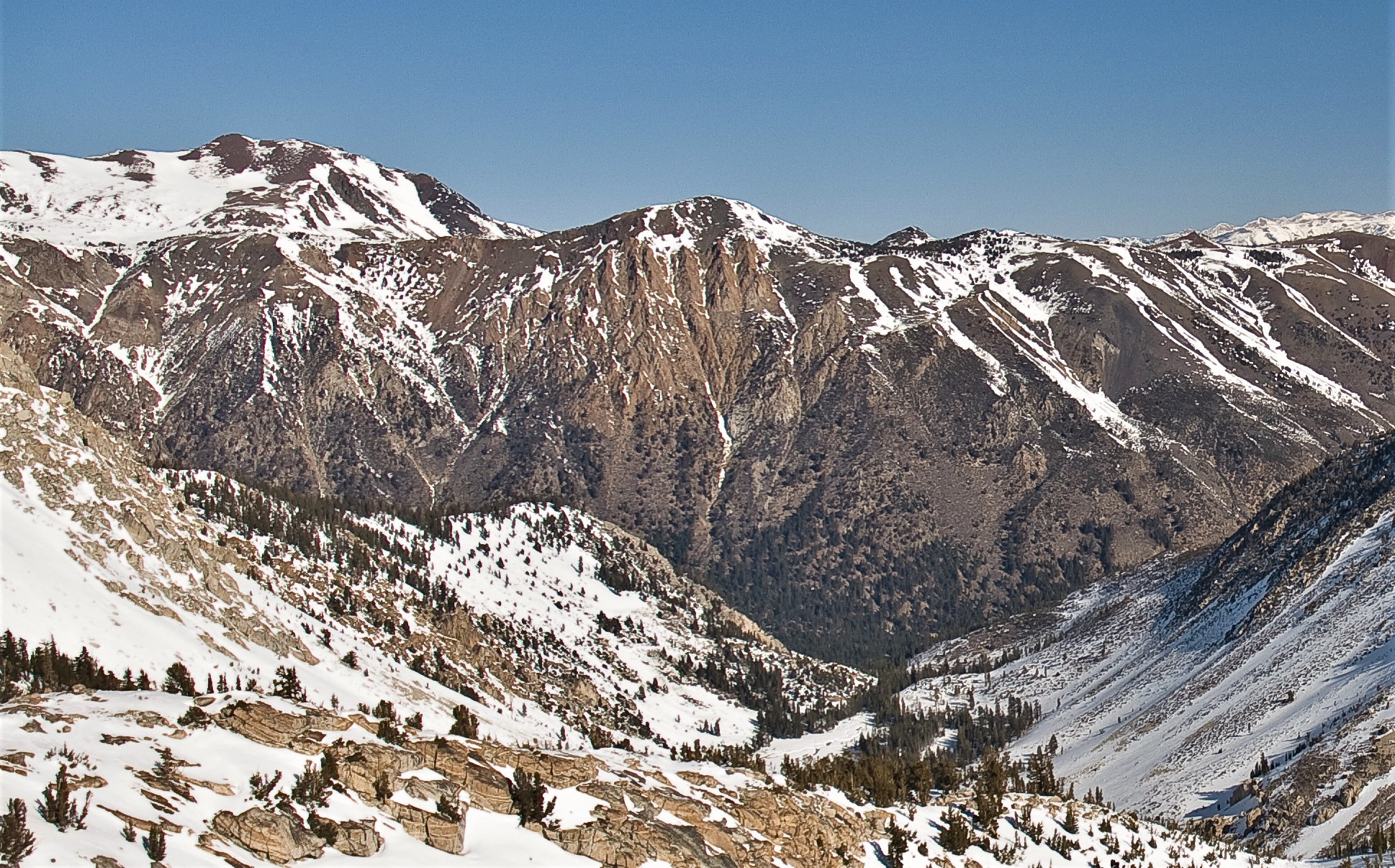
Robinson Peak (centered), Eagle Peak in upper left.

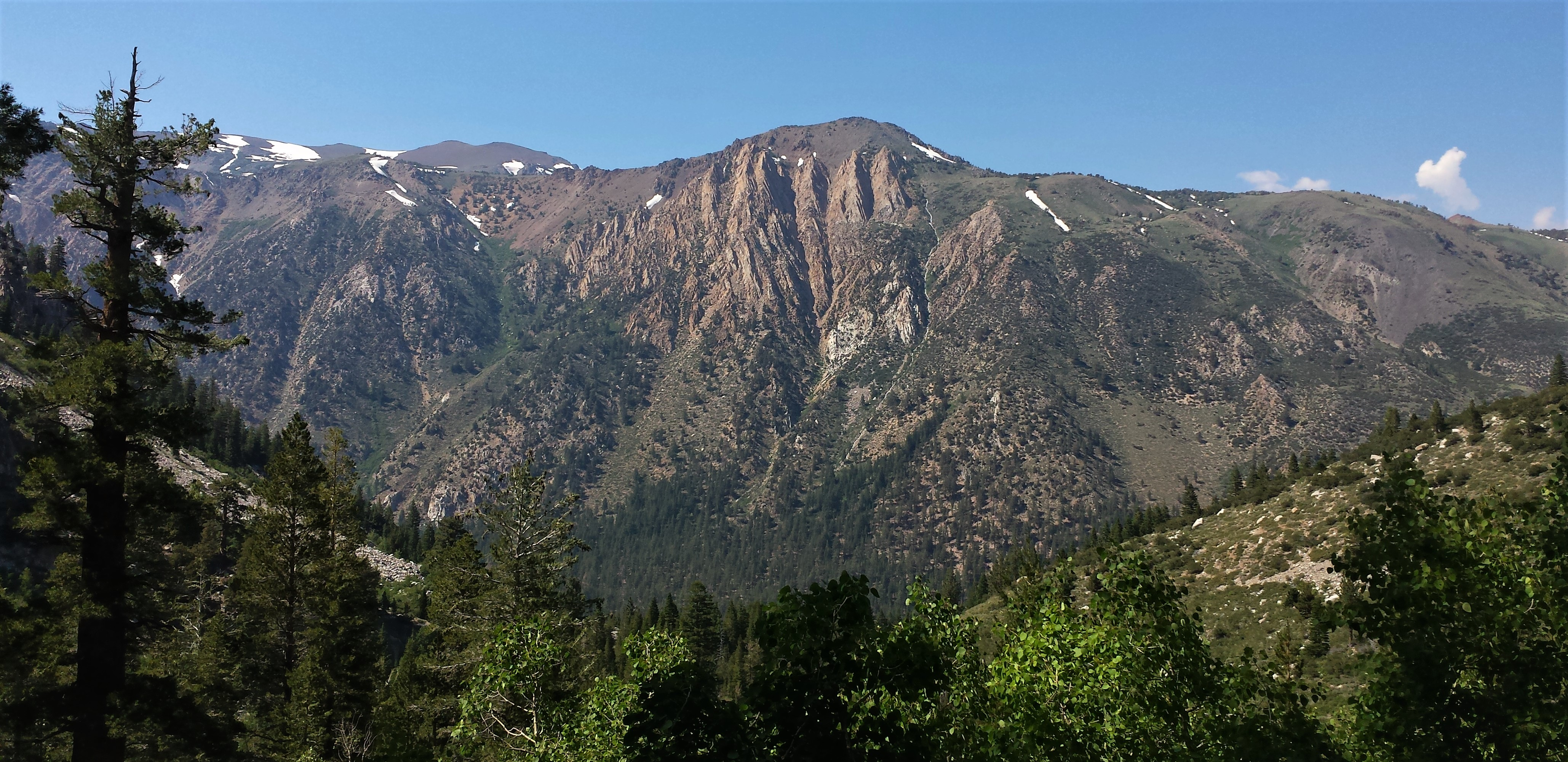
South aspect

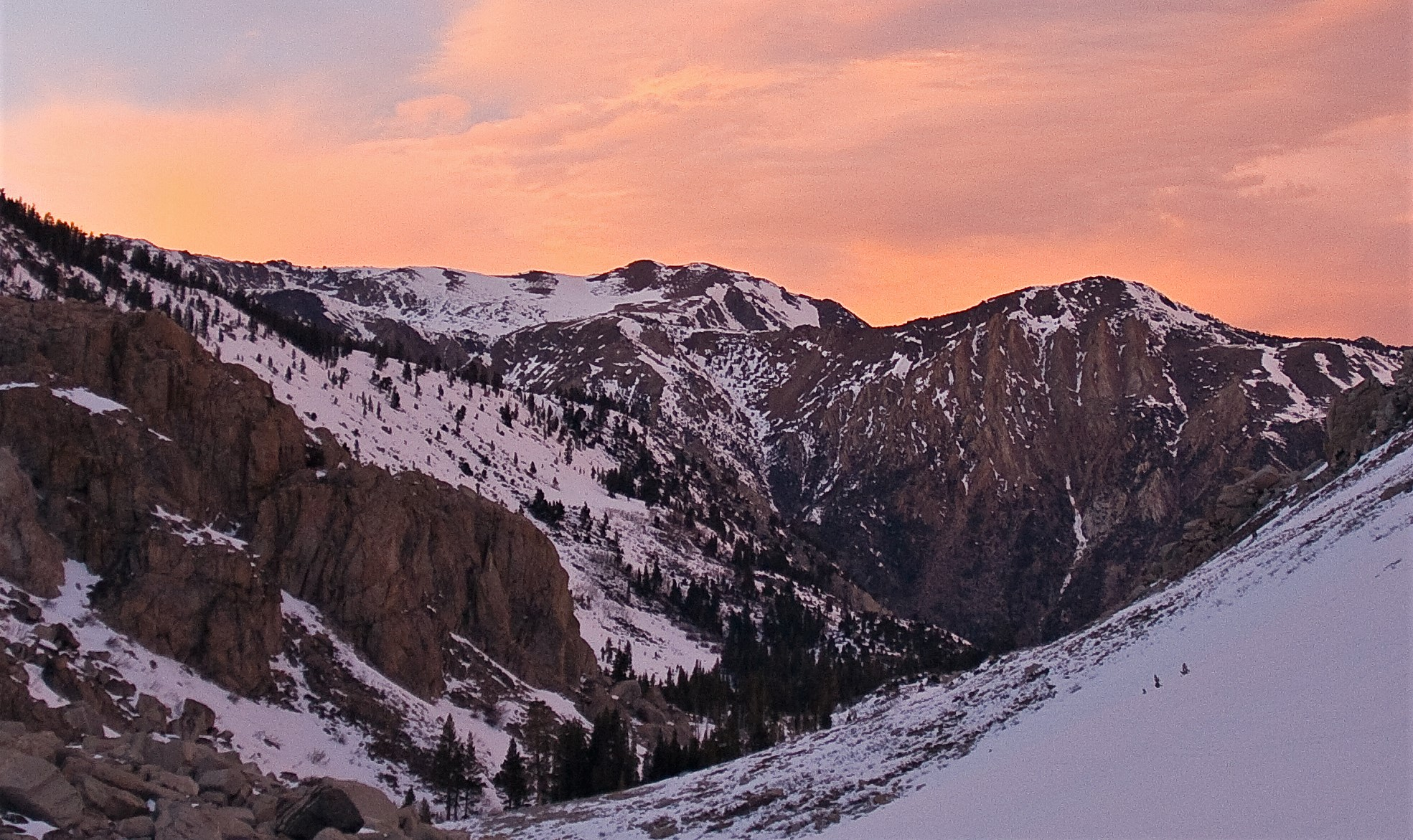
Eagle Peak centered in the distance with Robinson Peak to the right.

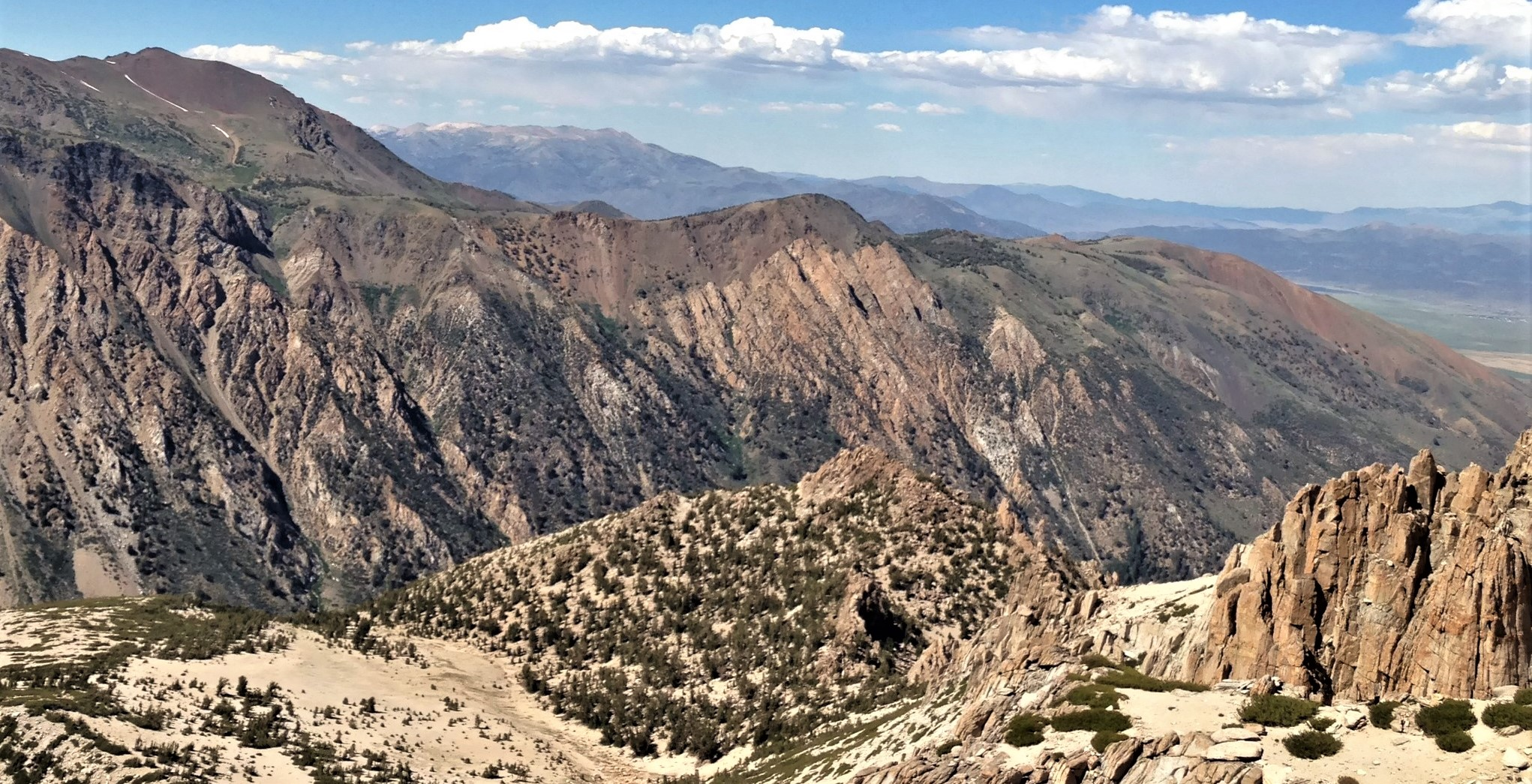
View from The Incredible Hulk with Eagle Peak in upper left corner, Robinson Peak centered, and Sawmill Ridge to right of Robinson.
