= Judge Wells =

Judge Wells may refer to:

- Ira K. Wells (1871–1934), judge of the United States District Court for the District of Puerto Rico
- Lesley B. Wells (born 1937), judge of the United States District Court for the Northern District of Ohio
- Robert William Wells (1795–1864), judge of the United States District Court for the District of Missouri and the Western District of Missouri
- Thomas B. Wells (born 1945), judge of the United States Tax Court

== See also ==
- Justice Wells (disambiguation)
