= Eagle Peak (Mono County, California) =

Mountain in the American state of California

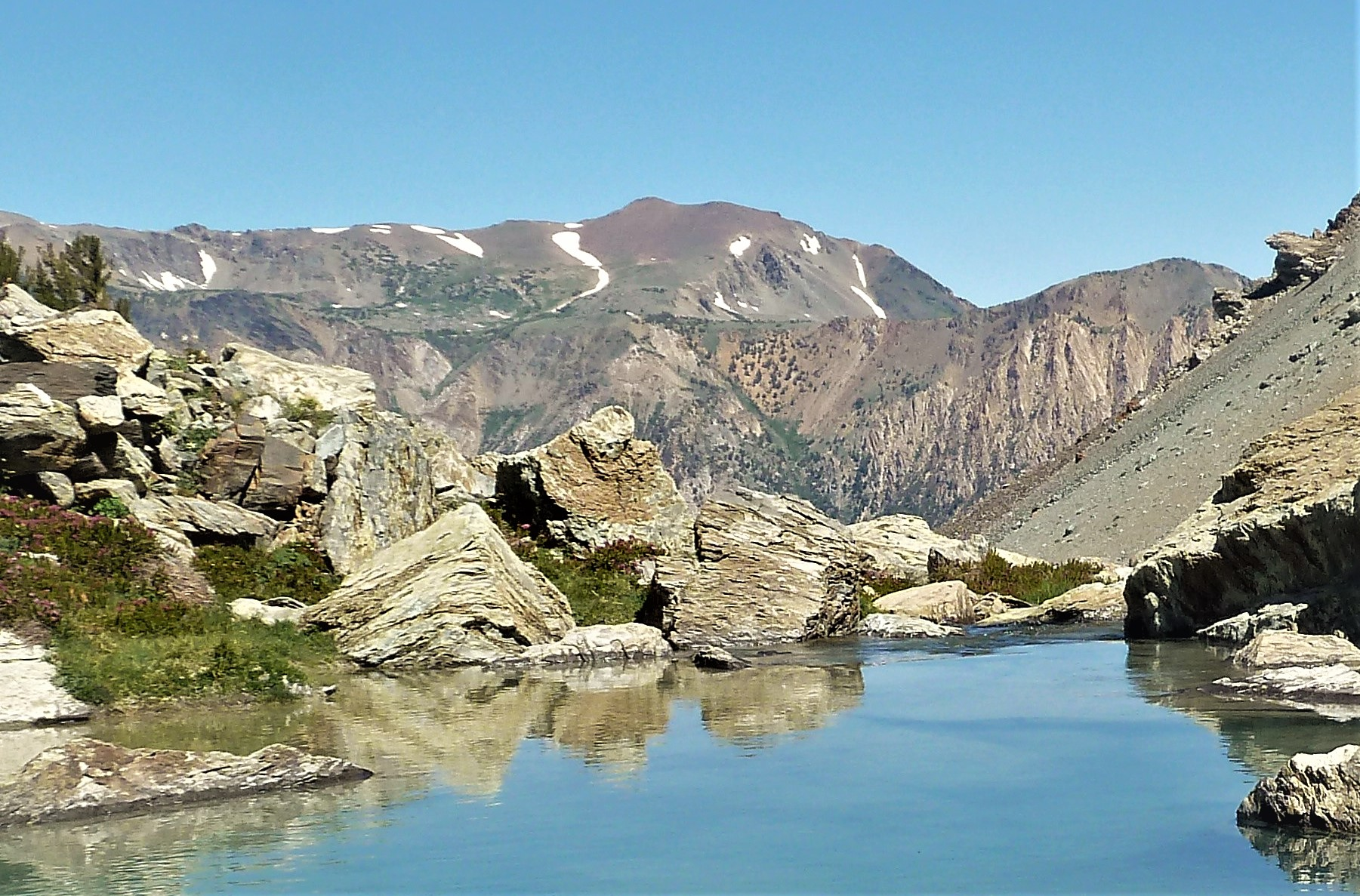
- South aspect centered in the distance

Highest point
- Elevation: 11,847 ft (3,611 m)
- Prominence: 2,358 ft (719 m)
- Parent peak: Matterhorn Peak (12,279 ft)
- Isolation: 6.18 mi (9.95 km)
- Coordinates: 38°10′47″N 119°24′31″W

Geography
- Location within California Location within the United States
- Location: Mono County, California, U.S.
- Parent range: Sierra Nevada
- Topo map: USGS Buckeye Ridge

Climbing
- First ascent: 1905
- Easiest route: class 2 hiking

Eagle Peak is a mountain in the Sierra Nevada of Mono County, California. The summit is set in Hoover Wilderness on land managed by Humboldt–Toiyabe National Forest. Eagle Peak is the highest peak on Buckeye Ridge. Other peaks on this ridge include Hunewill Peak and Victoria Peak. The first ascent of Eagle Peak was made September 1905 by George Davis, A. H. Sylvester, and Pearson Chapman of the United States Geological Survey.

== Climate ==
According to the Köppen climate classification system, Eagle Peak is located in an alpine climate zone. Most weather fronts originate in the Pacific Ocean, and travel east toward the Sierra Nevada mountains. As fronts approach, they are forced upward by the peaks (orographic lift), causing moisture in the form of rain or snowfall to drop onto the range.

Climate data for Eagle Peak (Mono County) 38.1664 N, 119.4244 W, Elevation: 11,316 ft (3,449 m) (1991–2020 normals)
Month	Jan	Feb	Mar	Apr	May	Jun	Jul	Aug	Sep	Oct	Nov	Dec	Year
Mean daily maximum °F (°C)	30.5 (−0.8)	30.4 (−0.9)	32.9 (0.5)	36.5 (2.5)	44.3 (6.8)	54.2 (12.3)	62.3 (16.8)	61.6 (16.4)	55.9 (13.3)	46.8 (8.2)	37.6 (3.1)	31.5 (−0.3)	43.7 (6.5)
Daily mean °F (°C)	21.6 (−5.8)	20.3 (−6.5)	22.5 (−5.3)	25.4 (−3.7)	32.6 (0.3)	42.1 (5.6)	49.9 (9.9)	49.1 (9.5)	43.2 (6.2)	35.1 (1.7)	27.6 (−2.4)	22.2 (−5.4)	32.6 (0.3)
Mean daily minimum °F (°C)	12.8 (−10.7)	10.2 (−12.1)	12.1 (−11.1)	14.3 (−9.8)	20.9 (−6.2)	30.1 (−1.1)	37.5 (3.1)	36.7 (2.6)	30.5 (−0.8)	23.4 (−4.8)	17.6 (−8.0)	12.8 (−10.7)	21.6 (−5.8)
Average precipitation inches (mm)	5.55 (141)	4.99 (127)	4.71 (120)	2.70 (69)	1.67 (42)	0.59 (15)	0.75 (19)	0.60 (15)	0.70 (18)	1.77 (45)	2.87 (73)	5.04 (128)	31.94 (812)
Source: PRISM Climate Group

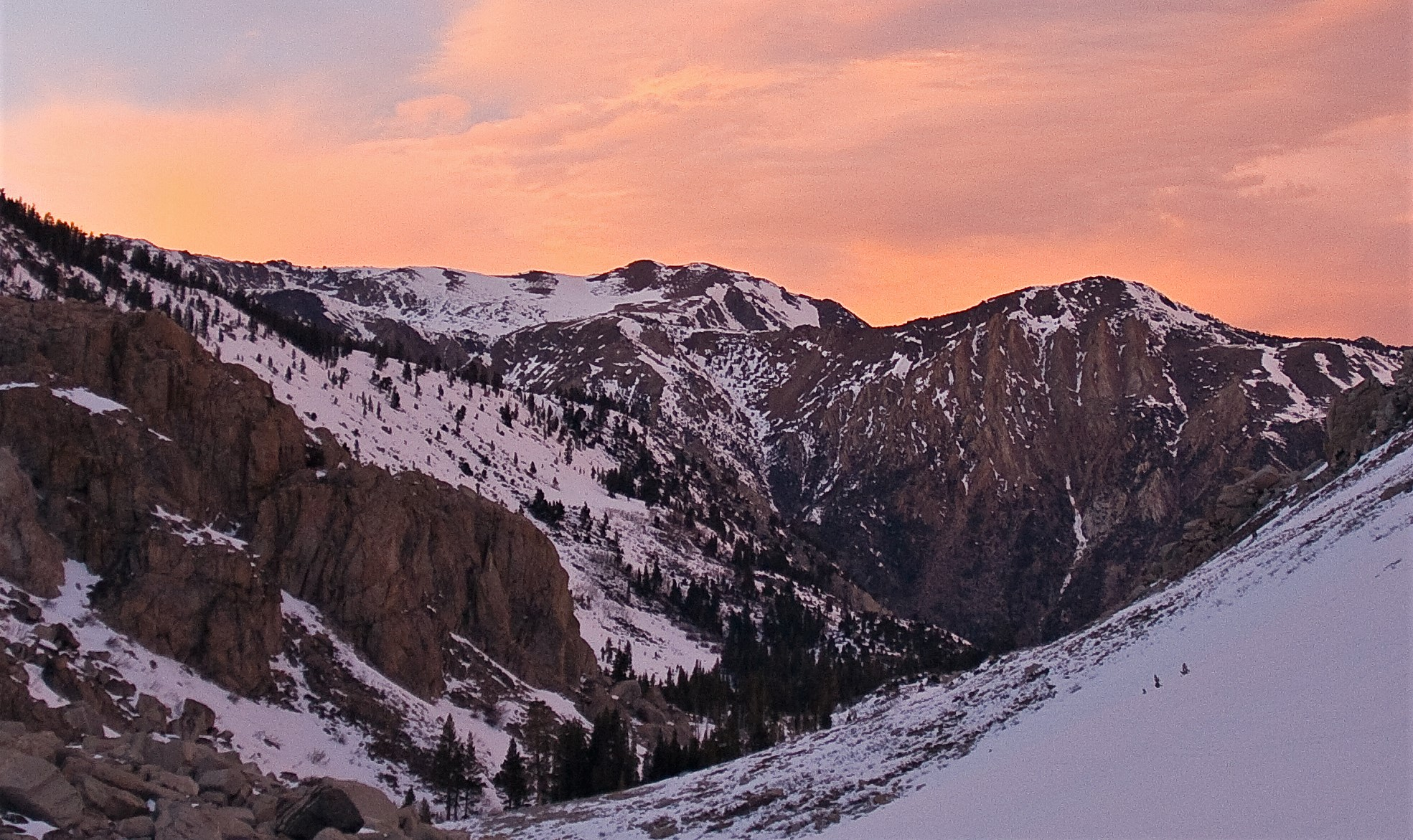
Eagle Peak center, Robinson Peak to right.
