= Wells, West Virginia =

Wells
- Unincorporated community
- Location within the state of West Virginia Wells (the United States)
- Coordinates: 39°46′58″N 80°35′32″W
- Country: United States
- State: West Virginia
- County: Marshall
- Elevation: 984 ft (300 m)
- Time zone: UTC-5 (Eastern (EST))
  - Summer (DST): UTC-4 (EDT)
- GNIS ID: 1717516

Wells was an unincorporated community in Marshall County, West Virginia.
