= Bomer =

Bomer is a surname. Notable people with the surname include:

- Elton Bomer (born 1935), American insurance executive and politician
- Matt Bomer (born 1977), American actor

== Places ==
- Saint-Bomer a commune in Eure-et-Loir, France
- Saint-Bômer-les-Forges in Orne France

== See also ==
- Bozer
