= Wells Vertige =

Two seater sports car

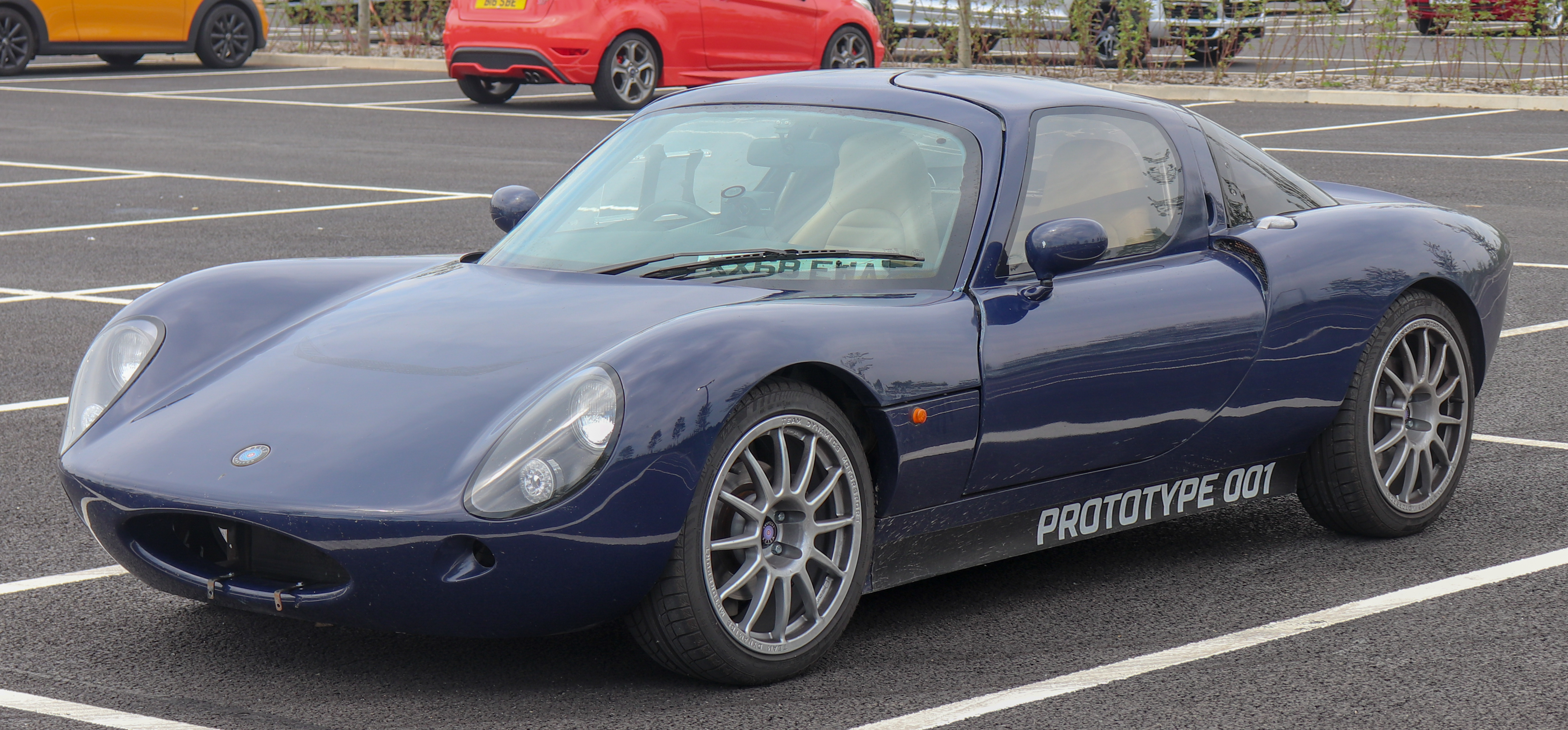
- 2018 Wells Vertige Prototype 001

Overview
- Manufacturer: Wells Motor Cars
- Production: 2021–
- Designer: Robin Wells

Body and chassis
- Class: Sports car
- Body style: Two door, Coupe
- Layout: Mid-engine, rear-wheel drive

Powertrain
- Engine: Inline-four Ford engine
- Transmission: 6-speed manual

Dimensions
- Wheelbase: 2,371 mm (93.3 in)
- Length: 3,944 mm (155.3 in)
- Width: 1,752 mm (69.0 in)
- Height: 1,142 mm (45.0 in)
- Curb weight: 963 kg (2,123 lb)

The Wells Vertige is a British mid-engine, rear-wheel drive two-seater sports car, manufactured in very low volumes by Wells Motor Cars, at their factory near Gaydon, Warwickshire.

== History ==
The car was created by Robin Wells who conceived the idea in 2014. No other sports car appealed, so he decided to make one himself — conforming to his vision of the "perfect sports car". The car made its public debut at the 2021 Goodwood Festival of Speed, and the initial production run of 25 quickly sold out. The Vertige (French for Vertigo) is built on a steel monocoque chassis with composite body, butterfly doors and tubular steel roll cage. It is equipped with front and rear aluminium double wishbone suspensions. Robin Wells included references to his training in classical music when designing the car, not least the shape of the wooden gear knob — designed to mimic the feel and precision of a conductor's baton.

Launch Edition models are powered by a naturally aspirated 2.0-litre inline four Ford Duratec petrol engine, producing 155 kW (208 hp; 211 PS) and 210 N⋅m (155 lb⋅ft) of torque, paired with a 6-speed manual transmission. It has an estimated top speed of 140 mph (225 km/h) and accelerates from 0 to 60 mph (0 to 97 km/h) in around 4.8 seconds.

Production takes place in batches, with no more than 25 cars produced per year at a factory in Bishop's Itchington, Warwickshire. The current price for cars ordered in 2025 starts at around £75,000. The first batch of 7 cars were built by nearby Hall Engineering & Design, and were privately released to close relatives and friends.

With the launch of the first production cars in 2025 (the Launch Edition), a group of owners, with support from Wells Motor Cars Ltd., established the Vertige Owners Club (the VOC).

== Gallery ==
=== Prototype 001 ===
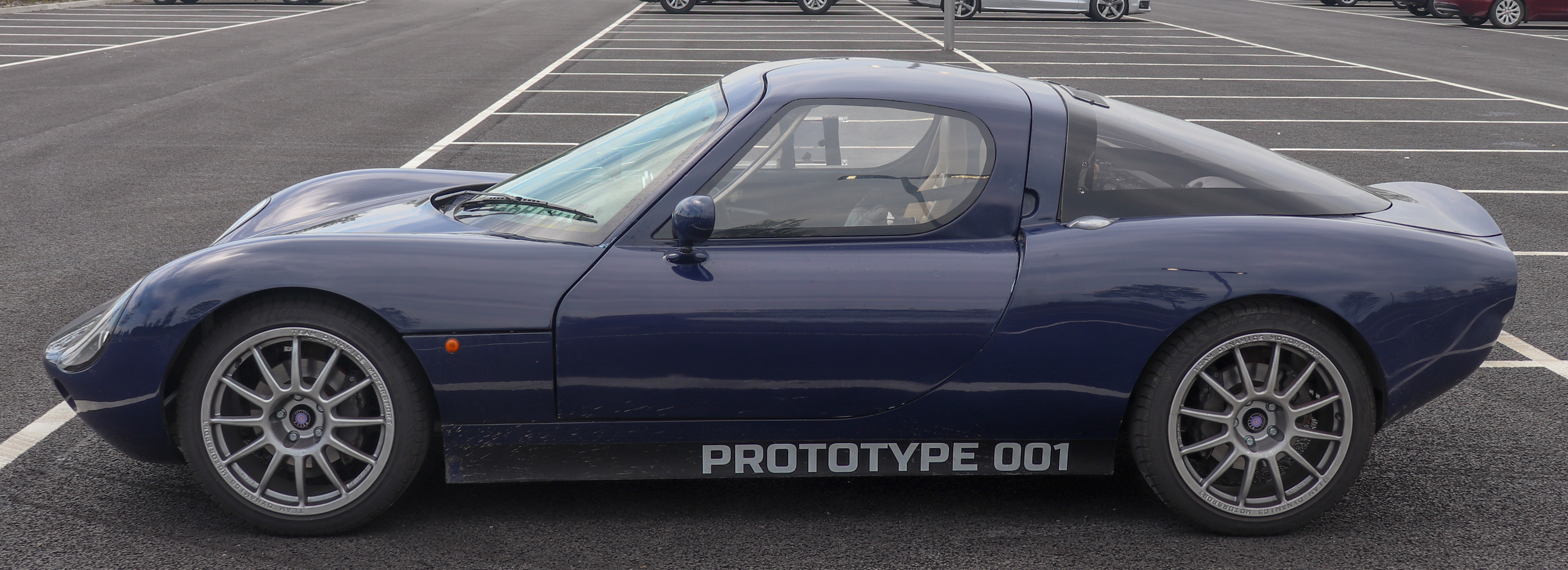
Side

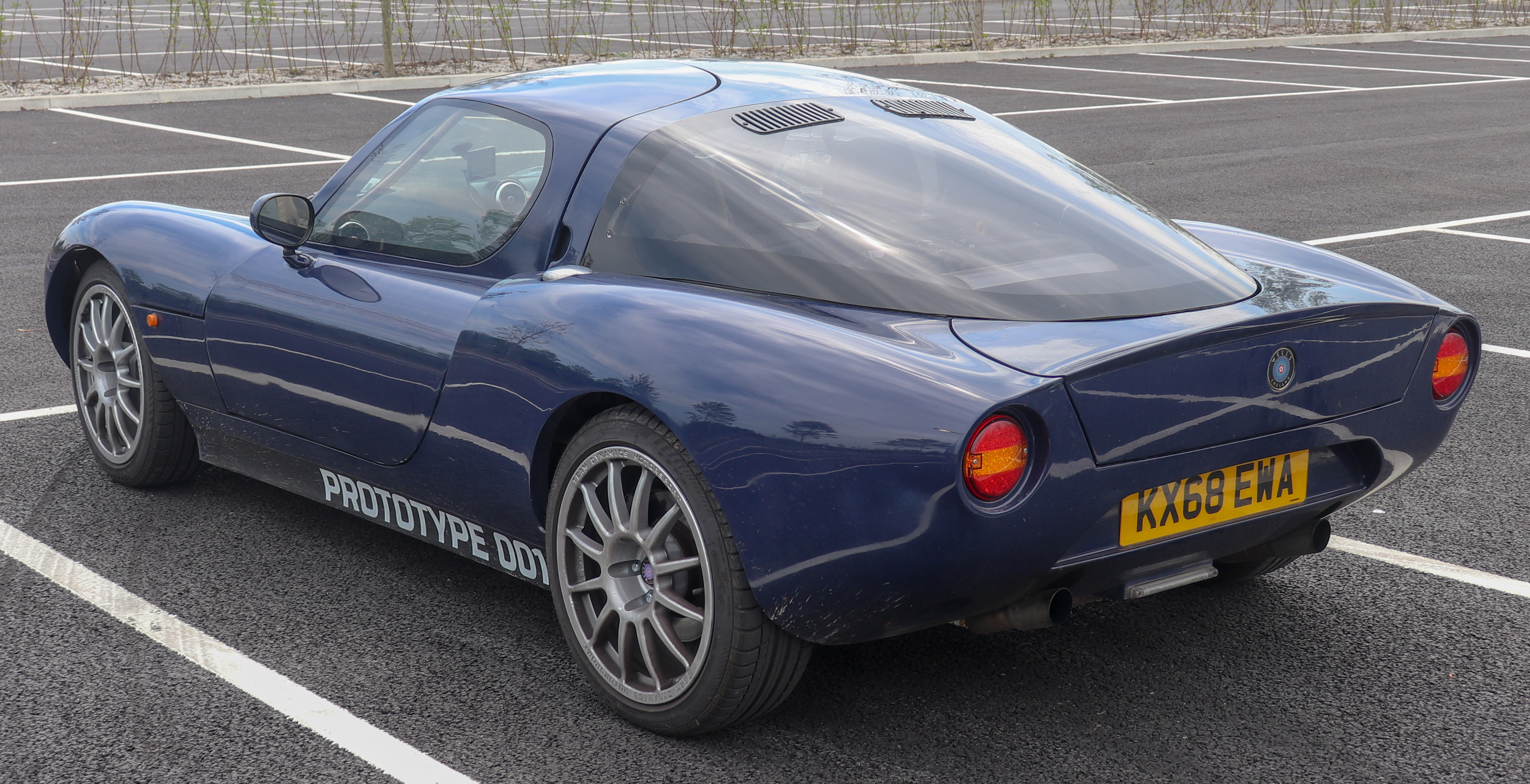
Rear

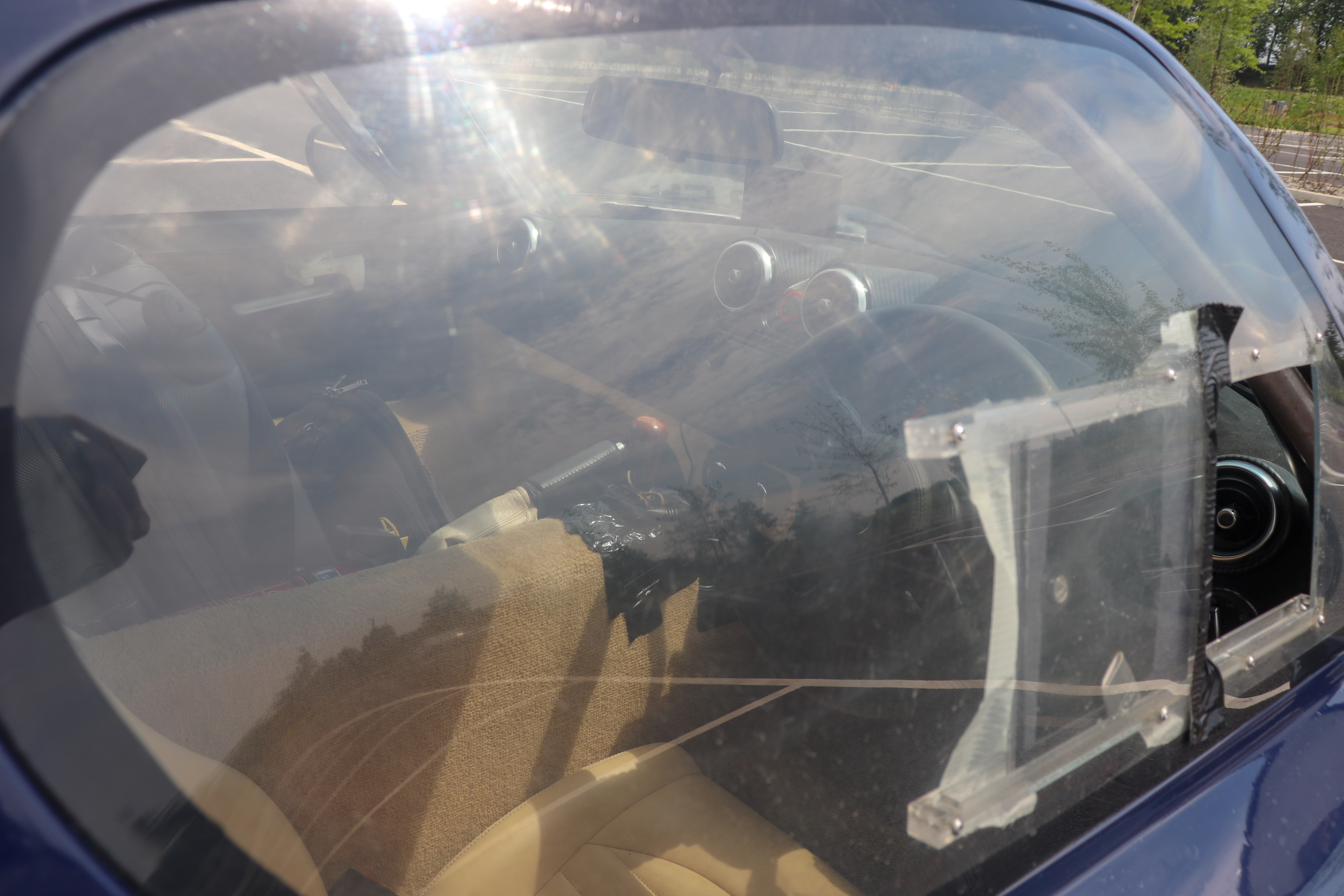
Interior

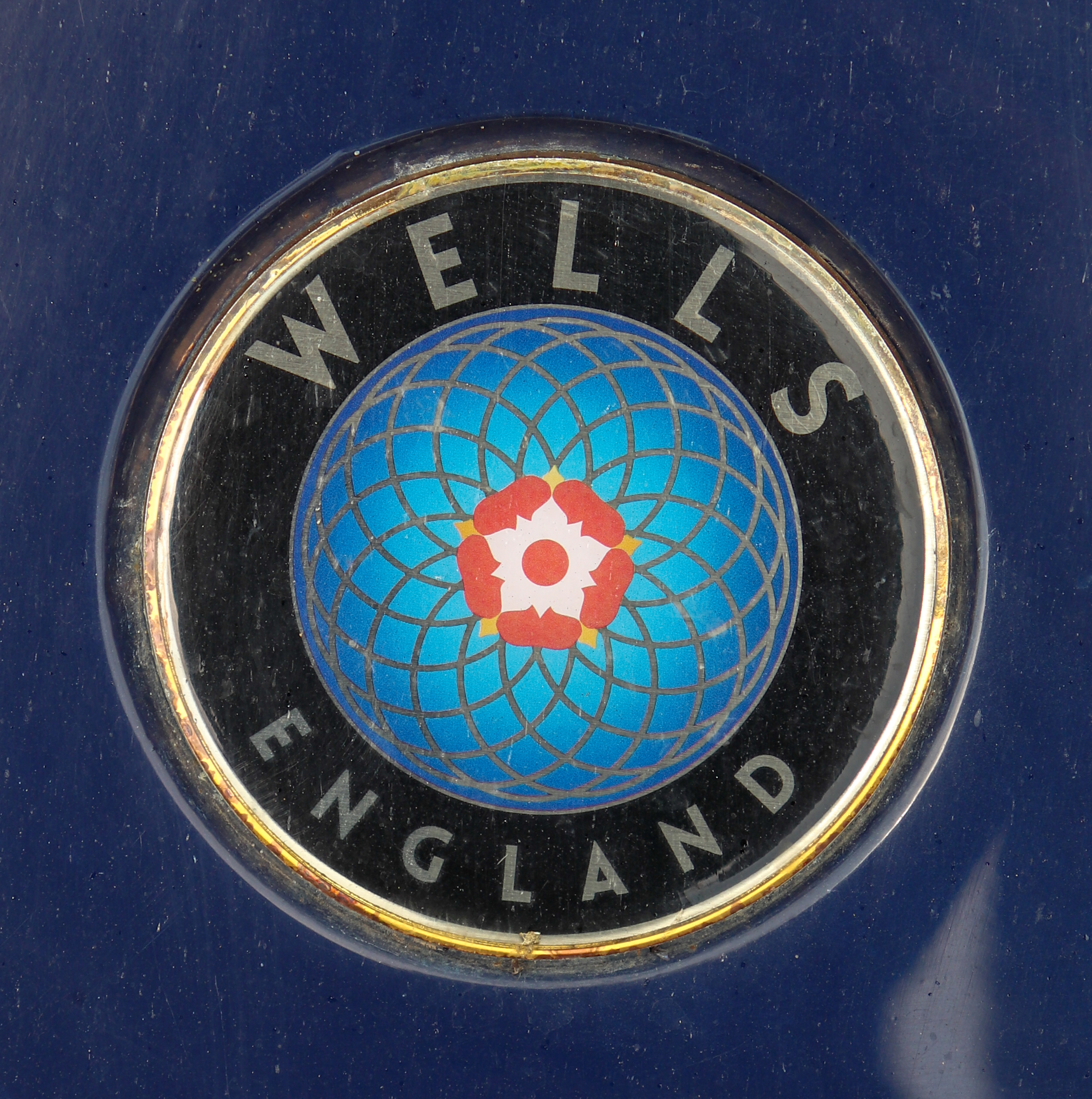
Badge

=== Production version ===
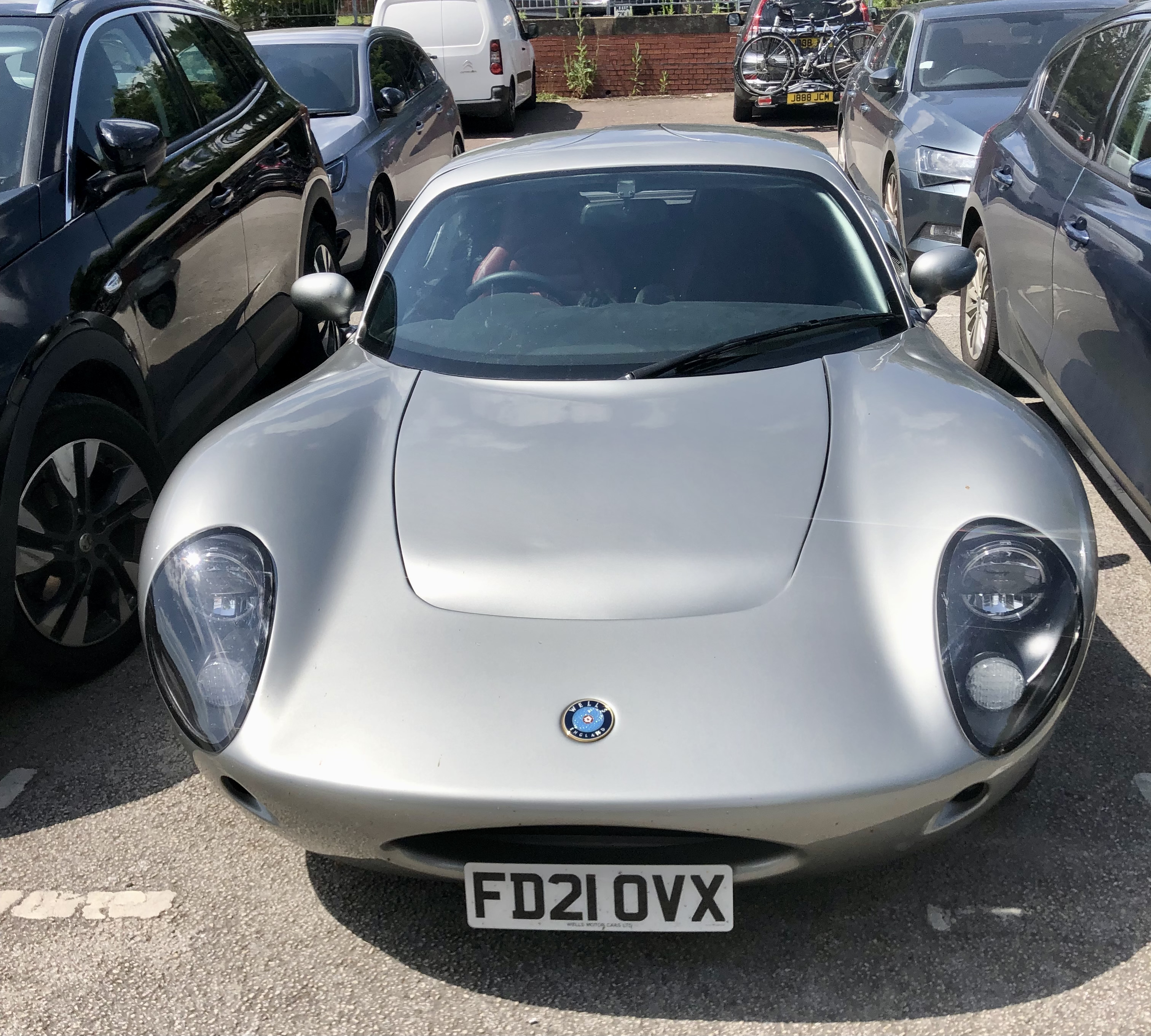

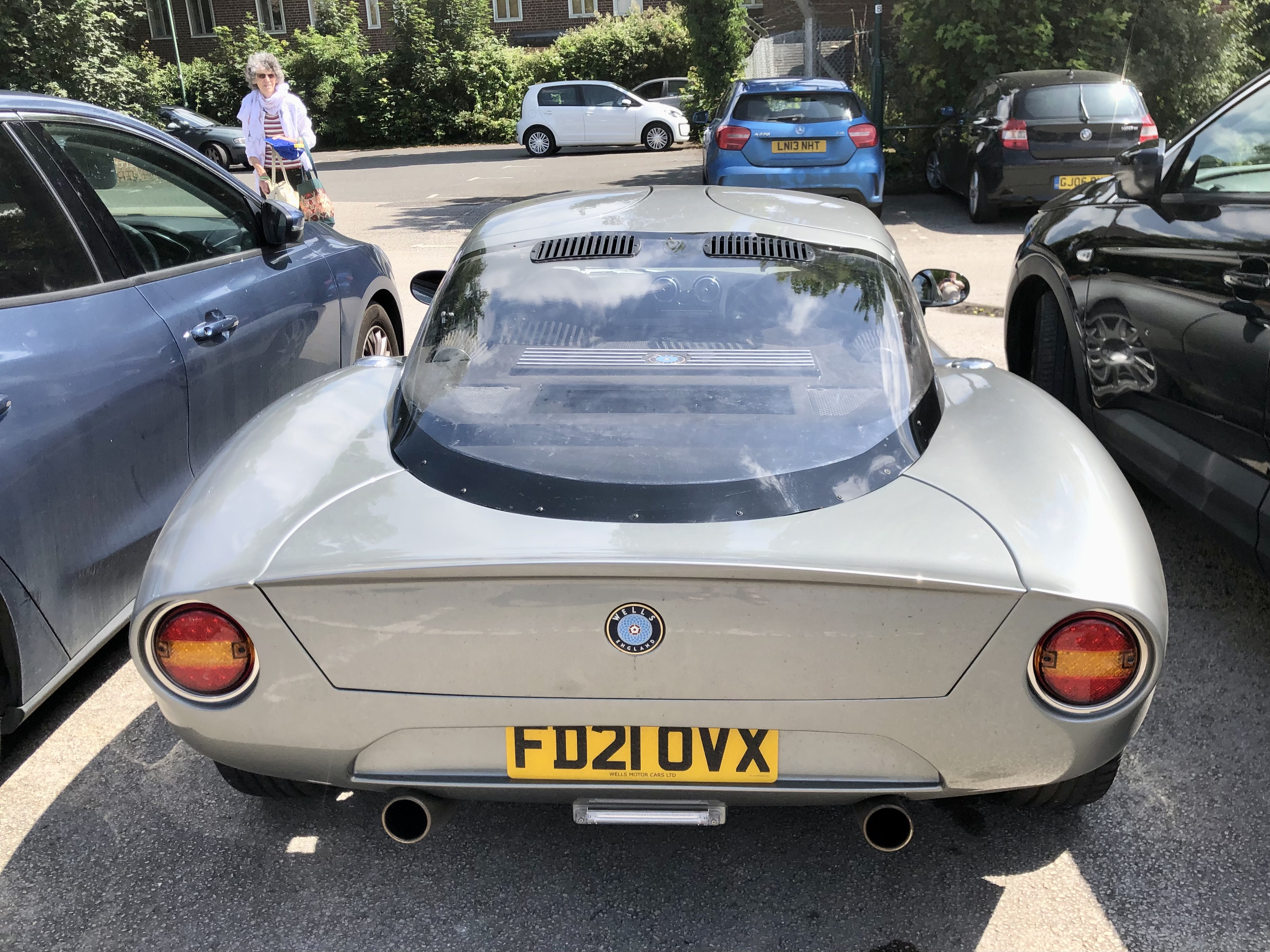

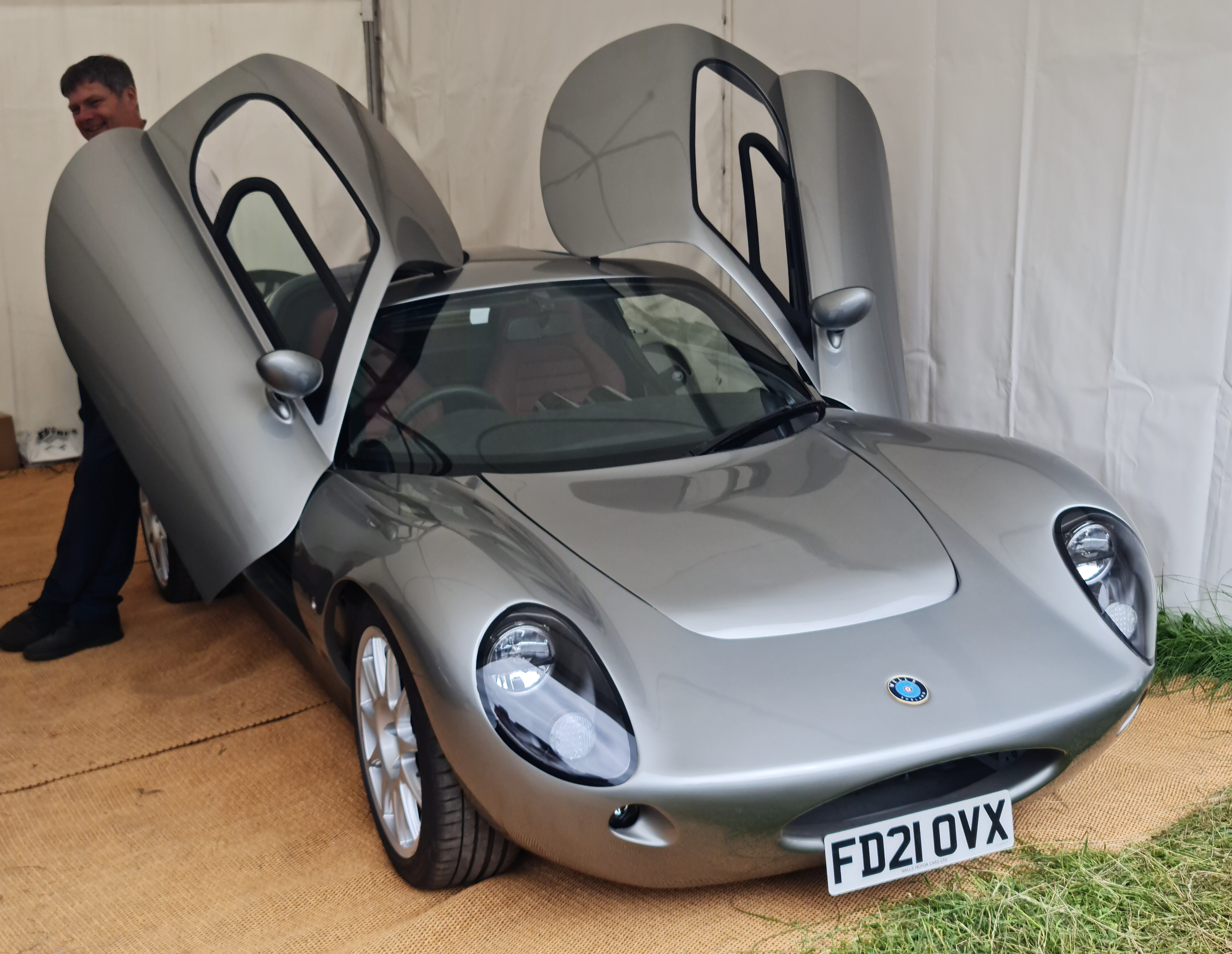

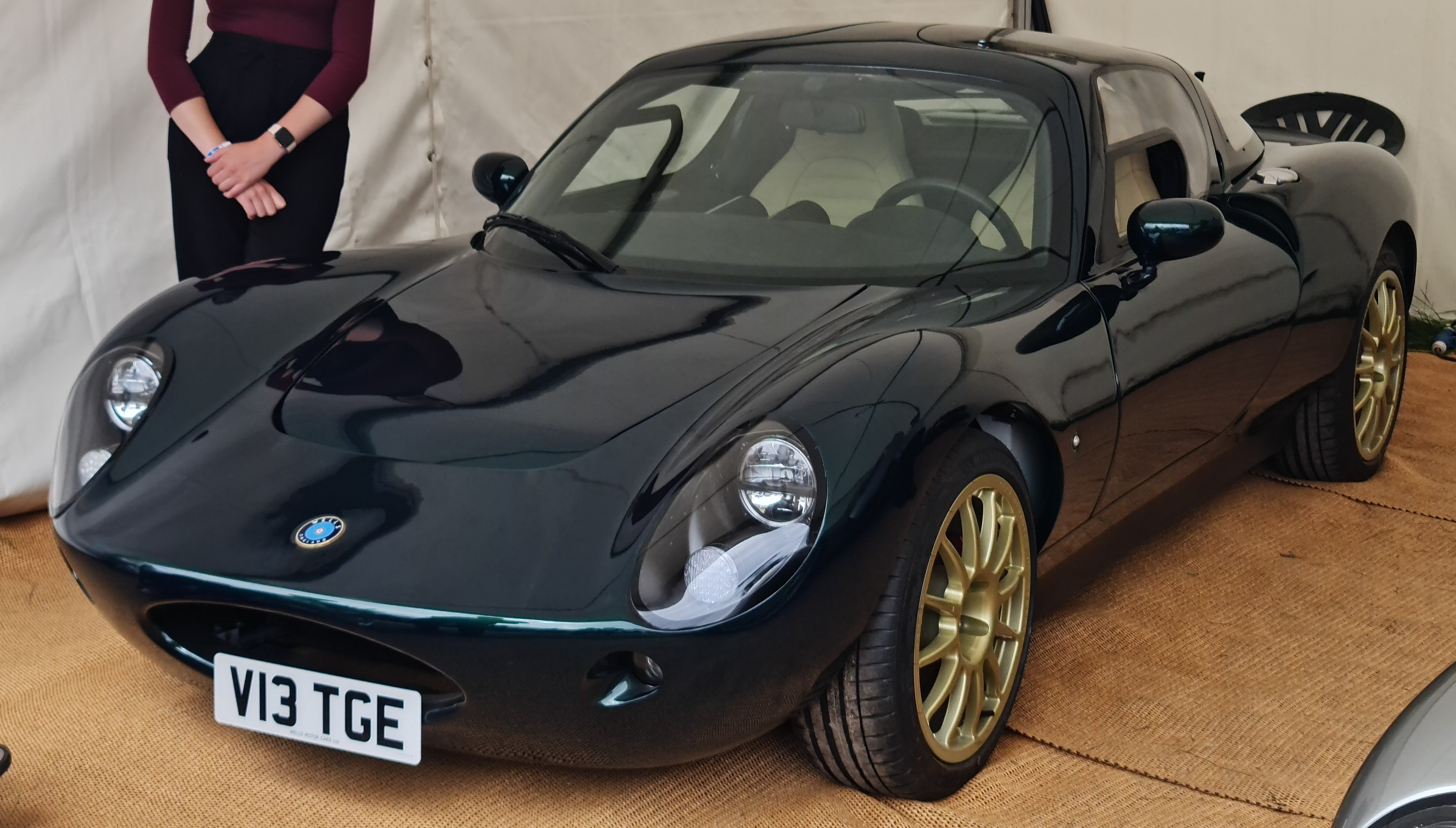
