= Welle =

Welle can refer to:

- The German word for wave used by the Wehrmacht to designate groups of divisions recruited in a given period of time.
- the river Wel in Poland
- the former Roman Catholic missionary Prefecture Apostolic of Welle in Congo
- Welle, Germany, a village in the district of Harburg, Lower Saxony, Germany
- The Wave (2008 film) (Die Welle), a 2008 German film based on the Third Wave experiment
- Deutsche Welle, Germany's international broadcast station
- Alan Welle (born 1945), American politician and businessman
