= Women's Electoral Lobby =

Women's Electoral Lobby may refer to the following feminist lobby groups:

- Women's Electoral Lobby (Australia)
- Women's Electoral Lobby (New Zealand)
