= Hawksbeak Peak =

Mountain in the state of California

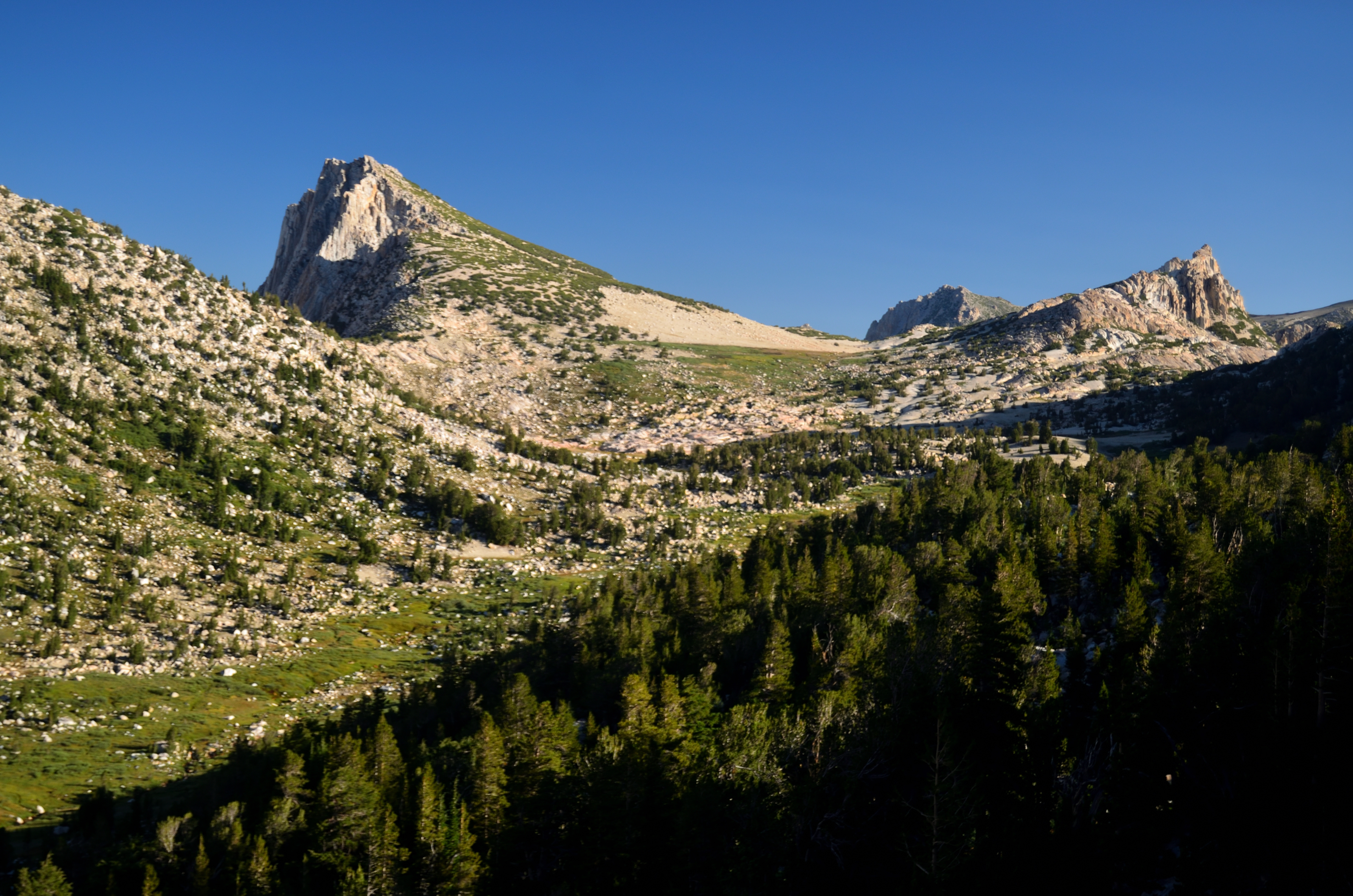
- South aspect (left), from Thompson Canyon

Highest point
- Elevation: 11,134 ft (3,394 m)
- Prominence: 874 ft (266 m)
- Parent peak: Center Mountain (11,271 ft)
- Isolation: 1.13 mi (1.82 km)
- Listing: Vagmarken Club Sierra Crest List
- Coordinates: 38°09′09″N 119°30′29″W

Geography
- Location within California Location within the United States
- Location: Yosemite National Park; Mono / Tuolumne counties California, U.S.
- Parent range: Sierra Nevada
- Topo map: USGS Tower Peak

Geology
- Rock age: Cretaceous
- Mountain type: Fault block
- Rock type: Granodiorite

Climbing
- Easiest route: class 1 South slope

Hawksbeak Peak is a mountain summit with an elevation of 11,134 feet (3,394 m) located on the crest of the Sierra Nevada mountain range, in northern California, United States. The granitic summit is situated on the common boundary shared by Yosemite National Park with Hoover Wilderness, as well as the common border of Mono County and Tuolumne County. This remote peak is set at the head of Thompson Canyon, approximately eight miles west of Twin Lakes and 17 miles southwest of Bridgeport, the nearest town. Topographic relief is significant as the west aspect rises over 1,300 feet (400 meters) in less than one-quarter mile. The class 5.10- West Face was first climbed in September 1989 by Alan Swanson and John Nye. This landform's toponym has been officially adopted by the U.S. Board on Geographic Names.

== Climate ==
According to the Köppen climate classification system, Hawksbeak Peak is located in an alpine climate zone. Most weather fronts originate in the Pacific Ocean and travel east toward the Sierra Nevada mountains. As fronts approach, they are forced upward by the peaks (orographic lift), causing moisture in the form of rain or snowfall to drop onto the range. Precipitation runoff from this landform drains northwest into headwaters of the West Walker River, and south to Rancheria Creek via Thompson Canyon.

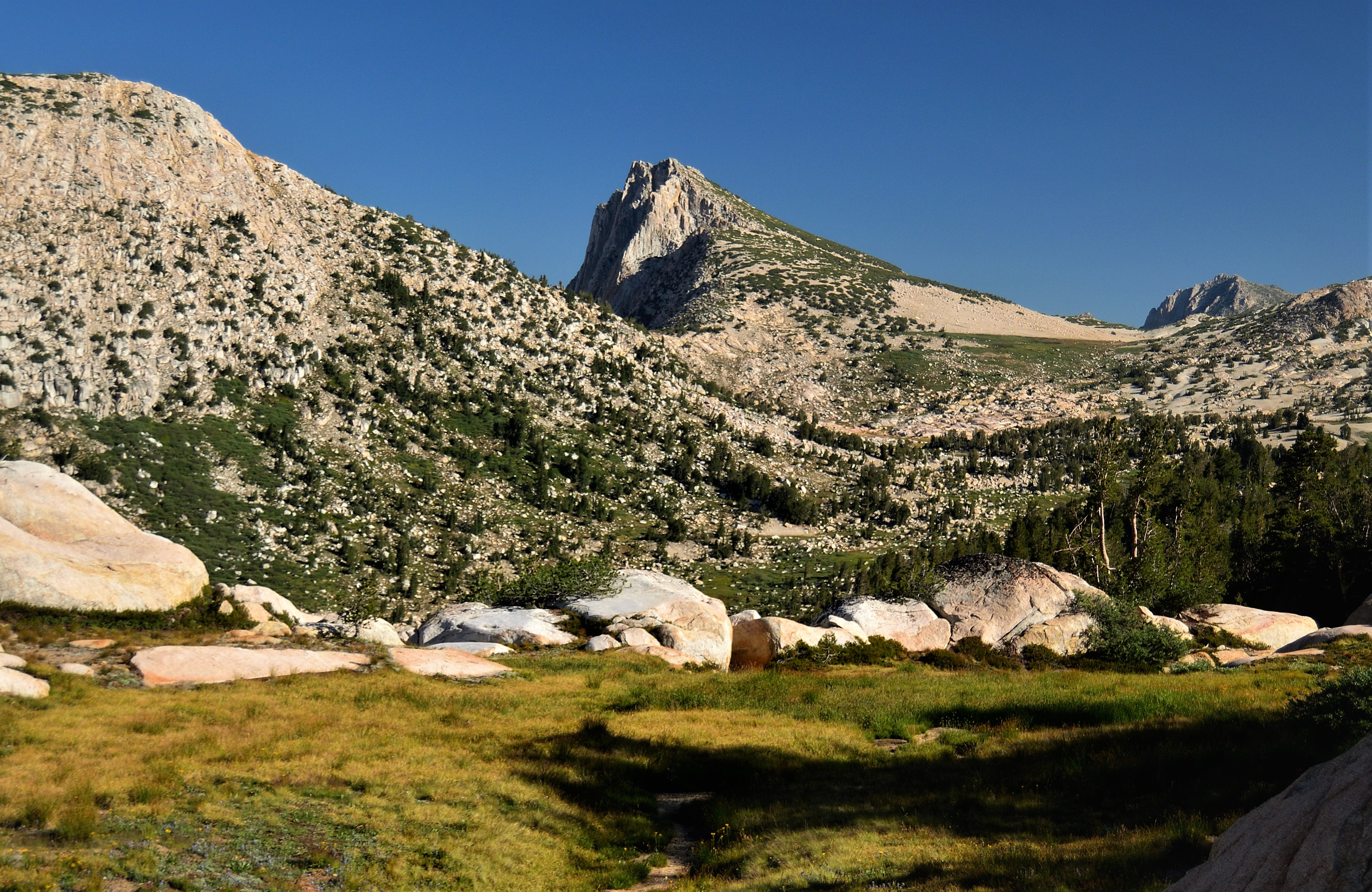
Hawksbeak Peak centered

== See also ==
- Geology of the Yosemite area
- Tuolumne Intrusive Suite
