= Wels (disambiguation) =

Wels is a city in northern Austria.

Wels may also refer to:

- the wels catfish, Silurus glanis
- Otto Wels, German politician, chairman of SPD (1873–1939)
- Rudolf Wels, Czech architect (1882–1944)

== See also ==
- WELS (disambiguation)
- Wells (disambiguation)
