= Justice Wells =

Justice Wells may refer to:

- Alexander Wells (California judge) (1819–1854), associate justice of the Supreme Court of California
- Charles T. Wells (born 1939), associate justice of the Supreme Court of Florida
- Ebenezer T. Wells (1835–1923), associate justice of the Supreme Court of Colorado
- John Wells (Massachusetts judge) (1819–1875), associate justice of the Massachusetts Supreme Judicial Court
- Thomas Wells (Australian judge) (c. 1888–1954), judge of the Northern Territory Supreme Court
- Thomas Wells (Rhode Island judge) (1723–c. 1795), associate justice of the Rhode Island Supreme Court

== See also ==
- Judge Wells (disambiguation)
