= Wells Township =

Wells Township may refer to the following places:

- Wells Township, Appanoose County, Iowa
- Wells Township, Marshall County, Kansas
- Wells Township, Delta County, Michigan
- Wells Township, Marquette County, Michigan
- Wells Township, Tuscola County, Michigan
- Wells Township, Rice County, Minnesota
- Wells Township, Wells County, North Dakota
- Wells Township, Jefferson County, Ohio
- Wells Township, Blaine County, Oklahoma
- Wells Township, Bradford County, Pennsylvania
- Wells Township, Fulton County, Pennsylvania
- Wells Township, Perkins County, South Dakota

There is also: Dry Wells Township, Nash County, North Carolina

See also

- Wells (disambiguation)
