= The Well (video game) =

2021 horror game

- Header image on Yames's Itch.io website
- Developer: Yames
- Designer: Yames
- Platforms: Microsoft Windows macOS
- Release: 20 September 2021
- Genre: Graphic adventure
- Mode: Single-player

The Well is a 2021 horror-themed adventure game developed by Yames. The self-published game was released on Itch.io on 20 September 2021, and is based on a poem by H. P. Lovecraft in Fungi from Yuggoth.

== Gameplay ==
The Well is a short game, taking about 20 minutes to complete, and is played using only one button (Z). Much of the game is taken up by a segment in which the player lowers and lifts a rope in the titular well.

== Plot ==
The Well takes place after a farmer, Seth Atwood, has gone mad after digging a well on his property. After this, Atwood's nephew also went mad, killed him, carved "godless signs" in his naked body, and bricked up his body inside the well. The game follows two men who are sent to clear out Atwood's farmhouse. The player enters the well in search of "pagan gold",. despite being specifically instructed not to, and finds various horrors down there. These discoveries include a series of tokens, each more horrific than the last, eventually discovering a terrible growing presence at the well's bottom.

== Development and themes ==
The Well is based on one of the poems by H. P. Lovecraft in Fungi from Yuggoth. The game is, in addition to the rise of a monstrous entity, also about the cost of creation.

The game was released on Itch.io for Microsoft Windows and macOS on 20 September 2021 for $1.99. The Well is intended to be the first in a series of short games titled Yames' Secret Games.

== Reception ==
The Well received a positive review in DREAD XP, which called the writing "fantastic" and praised the art style as "[leaving] just enough to the imagination". The game also received praise by Daniel Simmonds of The Rotting Zombie, who gave it 7/10, finding it to be faithful to the original poem and having anxiety-inducing retro-style graphics and sound design. The Well was also positively reviewed by Ian Walker of Kotaku, who found the game to be "grisly and beautiful" and that it "nestled somewhere so deep and dark in my mind that I’ve yet to divine how to flush it out".
