= Welles =

Welles may refer to:

- Welles (name)
- USS Welles (DD-257), United States Navy destroyer
- USS Welles (DD-628), United States Navy destroyer
- Welles (musician), American

== See also ==
- Wells (name)
- Wells (disambiguation)
