= Well (disambiguation) =

A well is an artificial excavation, hole or structure for the purpose of withdrawing an underground resource, usually water

Well may also refer to:

== Structures ==
=== Used for resource extraction ===
- Castle well, providing a protected source of drinking water
- Oil well, a hole drilled through the Earth's surface for the purpose of extracting petroleum oil
- Salt well, or brine well, used to mine salt
- Well drainage of agricultural land by pumped wells
- Khajana well, well near Beed, India

=== Other structures ===
- Air well (condenser), a structure or device designed to promote the condensation of atmospheric moisture
- Clootie well, a place of pilgrimage in Celtic areas
- Holy well, often pagan sacred sites that were later Christianized
- Jacob's Well, of religious significance in the West Bank
- Lightwell, in architecture, an unroofed space designed to allow sunlight to reach interior areas
- Wishing well, a term from European folklore

== Places ==
- Well, Hampshire, England
- Well, Lincolnshire, a village in England
- Well, North Yorkshire, a village in England
- Well, Gelderland, Netherlands
- Well, Limburg, a village in the Netherlands
- Well (Chinese constellation)

== Arts, entertainment, and media ==
=== Music ===
==== Albums ====
- Well..., by Katey Sagal, 1994
- ...Well?, by Swell, 1991

==== Songs ====
- "Well", by Captain Beefheart and his Magic Band from Trout Mask Replica, 1969
- "Well", by Little Richard from The Explosive Little Richard, 1967
- "Well...", by Hayley Kiyoko from Panorama, 2022
- "Well (Baby Please Don't Go)", by The Olympics, 1998

=== Other uses in arts, entertainment, and media ===
- Well (play), 2004 play by Lisa Kron
- Well (film), 2016 Hungarian film

== Science and technology ==
- Well, the condition of having a high level of well-being
- Well, good health
- Gravity well or gravitational, a conceptual model of the gravitational field surrounding a body in space
- Potential well, a concept used in physics related to kinetic energy
- Quantum well, a potential well with only discrete energy values
- Well, a microtiter plate, used in chemistry and biochemistry

== Other uses ==
- Well drink, an alcoholic beverage made with liquor from a bartender's well
- Well Pharmacy, a British pharmacy chain
- The WELL, originally Whole Earth 'Lectronic Link, a virtual community
- "The Well", a nickname for the Scottish football team Motherwell F.C.
- The well of the court, part of the courtroom in some countries

== See also ==
- The Well (disambiguation)
- Wellness (disambiguation)
- WELL (disambiguation)
- Wells (disambiguation)
