= Wells Peak =

Mountain in the state of California

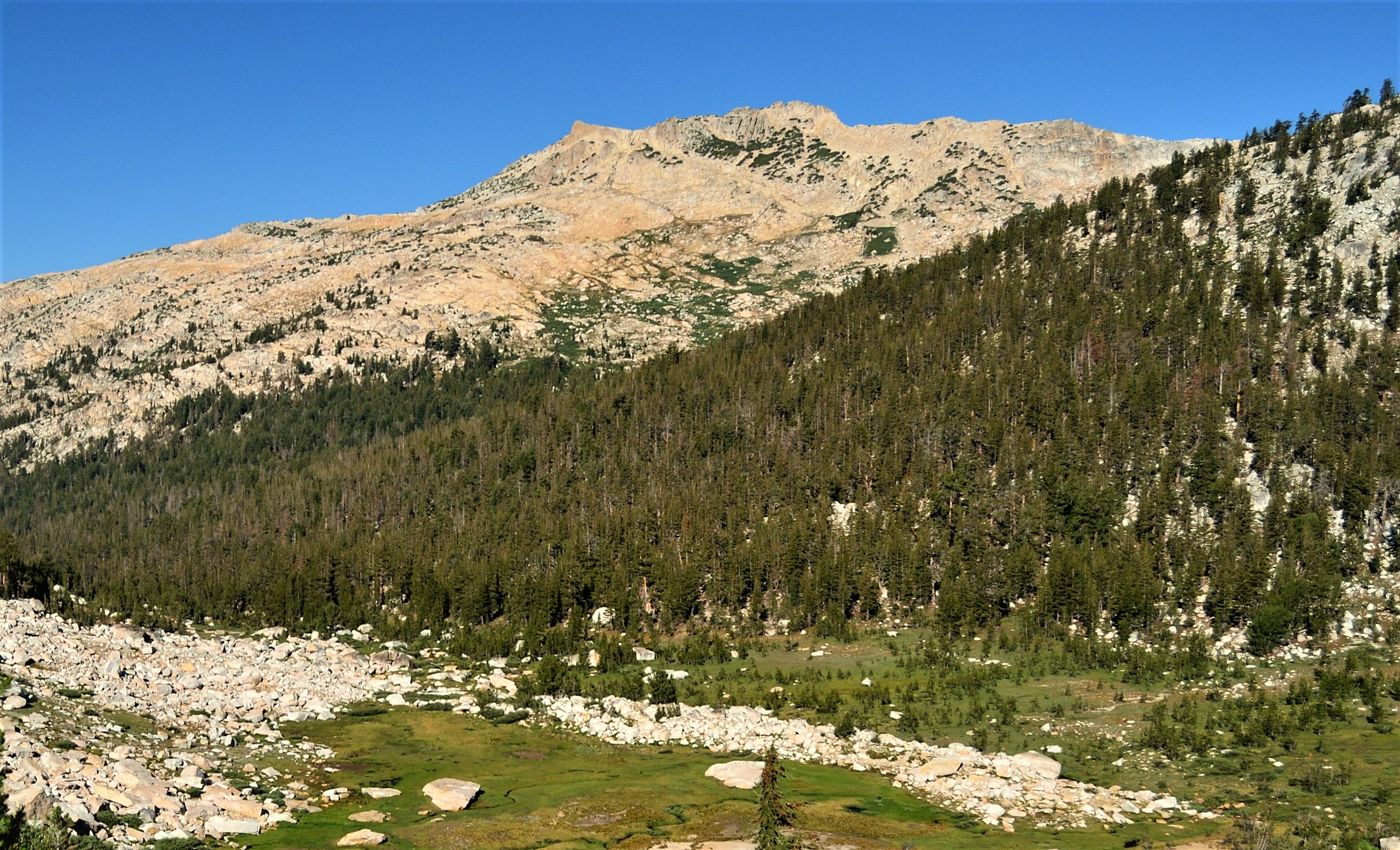
- East aspect, from Thompson Canyon

Highest point
- Elevation: 11,109 ft (3,386 m)
- Prominence: 449 ft (137 m)
- Parent peak: Ehrnbeck Peak (11,240 ft)
- Isolation: 1.25 mi (2.01 km)
- Coordinates: 38°07′21″N 119°31′43″W

Naming
- Etymology: Lt. Rush Spencer Wells

Geography
- Location within California Location within the United States
- Location: Yosemite National Park; Tuolumne County, California, U.S.
- Parent range: Sierra Nevada
- Topo map: USGS Piute Mountain

Geology
- Rock age: Cretaceous
- Mountain type: Fault block
- Rock type: Granodiorite

Climbing
- First ascent: 1945
- Easiest route: class 2 North ridge

Wells Peak is a granitic mountain summit with an elevation of 11,109 feet (3,386 m) located in Yosemite National Park, in Tuolumne County, California, United States. The peak is situated between Stubblefield and Thompson canyons in the Sierra Nevada mountain range. Topographic relief is significant as the summit rises 2,100 feet (640 meters) above Stubblefield Canyon in one mile. Precipitation runoff from this landform drains southwest to Hetch Hetchy via Rancheria Creek.

== History ==
Wells Peak was named in the 1890s by R. B. Marshall of the USGS to honor Rush Spencer Wells (1874–1951), US Army officer. The US Army had jurisdiction over Yosemite National Park from 1891 to 1914, and each summer 150 cavalrymen traveled from the Presidio of San Francisco to patrol the park. This landform's toponym was officially adopted by the U.S. Board on Geographic Names in 1932.

The first ascent of the summit was made July 27, 1945, by Arthur J. Reyman.

== Climate ==
According to the Köppen climate classification system, Wells Peak is located in an alpine climate zone. Most weather fronts originate in the Pacific Ocean and travel east toward the Sierra Nevada mountains. As fronts approach, they are forced upward by the peaks (orographic lift), causing moisture in the form of rain or snowfall to drop onto the range.

== See also ==
- Geology of the Yosemite area
- Tuolumne Intrusive Suite
