= List of airline codes (V) =

This is a list of all airline codes. The table lists the IATA airline designators, the ICAO airline designators and the airline call signs (telephony designator). Historical assignments are also included for completeness.

== Codes ==
Airline codes
IATA	ICAO	Airline	Call sign	Country	Comments
JW	VNL	Vanilla Air	VANILLA	Japan	Merged with Peach Aviation
VU	VAG	Vietravel Airlines	VIETRAVEL AIR	Vietnam	
	VAI	Volant Aviation International		Pakistan	
	VAR	Veca Airlines	VECA	El Salvador	
	VLR	Volare 22 X	VOLAX	Mexico	
	VDR	Voldirect	VOLDIR	France	
	VVV	Valair Aviação Lda	VALAIRJET	Portugal	
VB	VIV	VivaAerobus	VIVA	Mexico	
	VIL	V I Airlink	TURTLE DOVE	British Virgin Islands	
VA	VOZ	Virgin Australia	VELOCITY	Australia	Previously Used: KANGA, AURORA, VEE-OZ
	VBA	V Bird Airlines Netherlands	VEEBEE	Netherlands	
	WIW	V-avia Airline	VEE-AVIA	Ukraine	
	VBD	V-Berd-Avia	VEEBIRD-AVIA	Armenia	
	VAC	Vacationair	VACATIONAIR	Canada	
	RDW	Valair AG (Helicoptere)	ROADWATCH	Switzerland	
	VLA	Valan International Cargo Charter	NALAU	South Africa	
	VLN	Valan Limited	VALAN	Moldova	
	EHR	Valfell-Verkflug	ROTOR	Iceland	
VF	VLU	Valuair	VALUAIR	Singapore	Merged with Jetstar Asia 2014
VF		AnadoluJet	AJet	Turkiye	
J7	VJA	ValuJet Airlines	CRITTER	United States	Now operating as AirTran Airways. J7 Reassigned.
	VJA	Vista America	ICONIC	United States	Using the ICAO code that was previously assigned to ValuJet Airlines.
	VAA	Van Air Europe	EUROVAN	Czech Republic	
	VGC	Vanguardia en Aviación en Colima	VANGUARDIA COLIMA	Mexico	
	VGD	Vanguard Airlines	VANGUARD AIR	United States	
	VRH	Varesh Airlines	SKY VICTOR	Iran	
0V	VFC	Vietnam Air Services Company (VASCO)	VASCO AIR	Vietnam	
	VAG	Vega	SEGA	Kazakhstan	
	WGA	Vega Air Company	WEGA FRANKO	Ukraine	
	WEL	Veles, Ukrainian Aviation Company	VELES	Ukraine	
	VTX	Verataxis	VERATAXIS	Mexico	
	BTP	Veritair	NET RAIL	United Kingdom	
VC	VAL	Voyageur Airways	VOYAGEUR	Canada	
	GRV	Vernicos Aviation	NIGHT RIDER	Greece	
VN	HVN	Vietnam Airlines	VIET NAM	Vietnam	
	TMB	Volato	Tombo	United States	
	KWA	Vozdushnaya Academy	VOZAIR	Kazakhstan	
NN	MOV	VIM Airlines	MOV AIR	Russia	
	MVY	VIM-Aviaservice		Russia	
2R		Via Rail Canada		Canada	
	ENV	Victoria Aviation	ENDEAVOUR	United Kingdom	
	VCT	Viscount Air Service	VISCOUNT AIR	United States	
	SSI	Vision Airlines	SUPER JET	Nigeria	
	FXF	VIP Air Charter	FOX FLIGHT	United States	
	PAV	VIP Avia	NICOL	Kazakhstan	
	PRX	VIP Avia	PAREX	Latvia	
	VAT	Visionair	VISIONAIR	Ireland	
VA		Viasa		Venezuela	IATA Code transferred to Virgin Australia
	VCA	VICA - Viacao Charter Aéreos	VICA	Brazil	
	VCM	Volare Air Charter Company	CARMEN	United States	
Y4	VOI	Volaris	VOLARIS	Mexico	
VI	VDA	Volga-Dnepr Airlines	VOLGA	Russia	
	VEA	Vega Airlines	VEGA AIRLINES	Bulgaria	
	VEC	Venescar Internacional	VECAR	Venezuela	
	VEE	Victor Echo	VICTOR ECHO	Spain	
	VEI	Virgin Express Ireland	GREEN ISLE	Ireland	defunct
VX	VRD	Virgin America	REDWOOD	United States	Merged with Alaska Airlines
VJ	VJC	Vietjet Air	VIETJET	Vietnam	
V4	VES	Vieques Air Link	VIEQUES	United States	
TV	VEX	Virgin Express	VIRGIN EXPRESS	Belgium	defunct
	VFT	VZ Flights	ZETA FLIGHTS	Mexico	
VK	VGN	Virgin Nigeria Airways	VIRGIN NIGERIA	Nigeria	
	VGV	Vologda State Air Enterprise	VOLOGDA AIR	Russia	
	VHA	VH-Air Industrie	AIR V-H	Angola	
	VHM	VHM Schul-und-Charterflug	EARLY BIRD	Germany	
	VIB	Vibroair Flugservice	VITUS	Germany	
	VIC	VIP Servicios Aéreos Ejecutivos	VIP-EJECUTIVO	Mexico	
	VIE	VIP Empresarial	VIP EMPRESARIAL	Mexico	
	VIF	VIF Luftahrt	VIENNA FLIGHT	Austria	
	VIG	Vega Aviation	VEGA AVIATION	Sudan	
	VIH	Vichi	VICHI	Moldova	
	VIK	Viking Airlines	SWEDJET	Sweden	
	VIN	Vinair Aeroserviços	VINAIR	Portugal	
VS	VIR	Virgin Atlantic	VIRGIN	United Kingdom	
	VJM	Viajes Ejecutivos Mexicanos	VIAJES MEXICANOS	Mexico	
	VJT	Vistajet	VISTA	Canada	
	VJT	VistaJet	VISTA MALTA	Malta	2014
ZG	VVM	Viva Macau	JACKPOT	Macao	defunct
VE	VLE	C.A.I. Second	VOLA	Italy	
VY	VLG	Vueling Airlines	VUELING	Spain	
XF	VLK	Vladivostok Air	VLADAIR	Russia	Merged with Aurora
LC	VLO	Varig Logística	VELOG	Brazil	defunct
	VLT	Vertical-T Air Company	VERTICAL	Russia	
	VMA	Vero Monmouth Airlines	VERO MONMOUTH	United States	
	VNK	Vipport Joint Stock Company		Russia	
VM	VOA	Viaggio Air	VIAGGIO	Bulgaria	
	VOG	Voyager Airlines	VOYAGER AIR	Bangladesh	
VP	VQI	Villa Air	VILLA AIR	Maldives	
9V	VPA	Vipair Airlines	VIAIR	Kazakhstan	defunct
	VPB	Veteran Air	VETERAN	Ukraine	
	VPV	VIP-Avia	VIP AVIA	Georgia	
	VRA	Vertair	VERITAIR	United Kingdom	
	VRE	Volare Airlines	UKRAINE VOLARE	Ukraine	
	VRL	Voar Lda	VOAR LINHAS	Angola	
RG	VRN	Varig	VARIG	Brazil	
VH	VVC	Viva Air Colombia	Viva Air Colombia	Colombia	Commenced operations on May 25, 2012
	VSB	Vickers Limited	VICKERS	United Kingdom	
	VSN	Vision Airways Corporation	VISION	Canada	
	VSO	Voronezh Aircraft Manufacturing Society	VASO	Russia	
VP	VSP	VASP	VASP	Brazil	defunct
	VSS	Virgin Islands Seaplane Shuttle	WATERBIRD	United States	
	VTC	Vuelos Especializados Tollocan	VUELOS TOLLOCAN	Mexico	
	VTH	Vuelos Corporativos de Tehuacan	VUELOS TEHUACAN	Mexico	
V7	VOE	Volotea	VOLOTEA	Spain	
	VTK	Vostok Airlines	VOSTOK	Russia	
	VTL	Victor Tagle Larrain	VITALA	Chile	
	VTV	Vointeh	VOINTEH	Bulgaria	
	VUR	VIP Ecuador	VIPEC	Ecuador	defunct
	VUS	Vuela Bus	VUELA BUS	Mexico	
	VZL	Vzlyet	VZLYET	Russia	
VG	VLM	VLM Airlines	RUBENS	Belgium	defunct
	WCY	Viking Express	TITAN AIR	United States	
	WEV	Victoria International Airways	VICTORIA UGANDA	Uganda	
G6	WLG	Air Volga	GOUMRAK	Russia	
	VNR	Viennair	VIENNAIR	Austria	defunct
UK	VTI	Vistara	Vistara	India	Commenced operations 9 January 2015

== IATA Traffic Conference Areas ==
The International Air Transport Association (IATA) divides the world into three areas called the Traffic Conference Areas (TCAs) for air travel purposes. These areas are used to define geographical boundaries for fare construction and other industry-related practices:

- Traffic Conference Area 1 (TC1) – this area includes the Americas, encompassing North America (the Caribbean, Central America, and Northern America) and South America.
- Traffic Conference Area 2 (TC2) – this area includes the EMEA region, encompassing Europe, the Middle East, and Africa (North Africa and Sub-Saharan Africa).
- Traffic Conference Area 3 (TC3) – this area includes the Asia–Pacific region, encompassing the rest of Asia (Central Asia, East Asia, North Asia, South Asia, and Southeast Asia) and Oceania.

Essentially, TC1 covers the "New World", while TC2 and TC3 together cover the "Old World" (Africa-Eurasia) and the "Land Down Under".

== See also ==
- IATA airport code
- ICAO airport code
