= Wells (name) =

- Pronunciation: /wɛlz/

Origin
- Origin: Old English
- Meaning: Of spring

Other names
- Variant forms: Well, Welman, Welles, Wellman and Wellsman

Wells is an English habitational surname but is possibly also from an old English word for Wales. It normally derives from occupation, location, and topography. The occupational name (i.e. "Wellman") derives from the person responsible for a village's spring. The locational name (i.e. "Well") derives from the pre-7th century "wælla" ("spring"). The topographical name (i.e. "Attewell") derives from living near a spring. The oldest public record is found in 1177 in the county of Norfolk. Variations of Wells include Well, Welman, Welles, Wellman and Wellsman. At the time of the British Census of 1881, its relative frequency was highest in Berkshire (3.2 times the British average), followed by Leicestershire, Oxfordshire, Kinross-shire, Huntingdonshire, Kent, Sussex, Lincolnshire, Dumfriesshire and Bedfordshire.

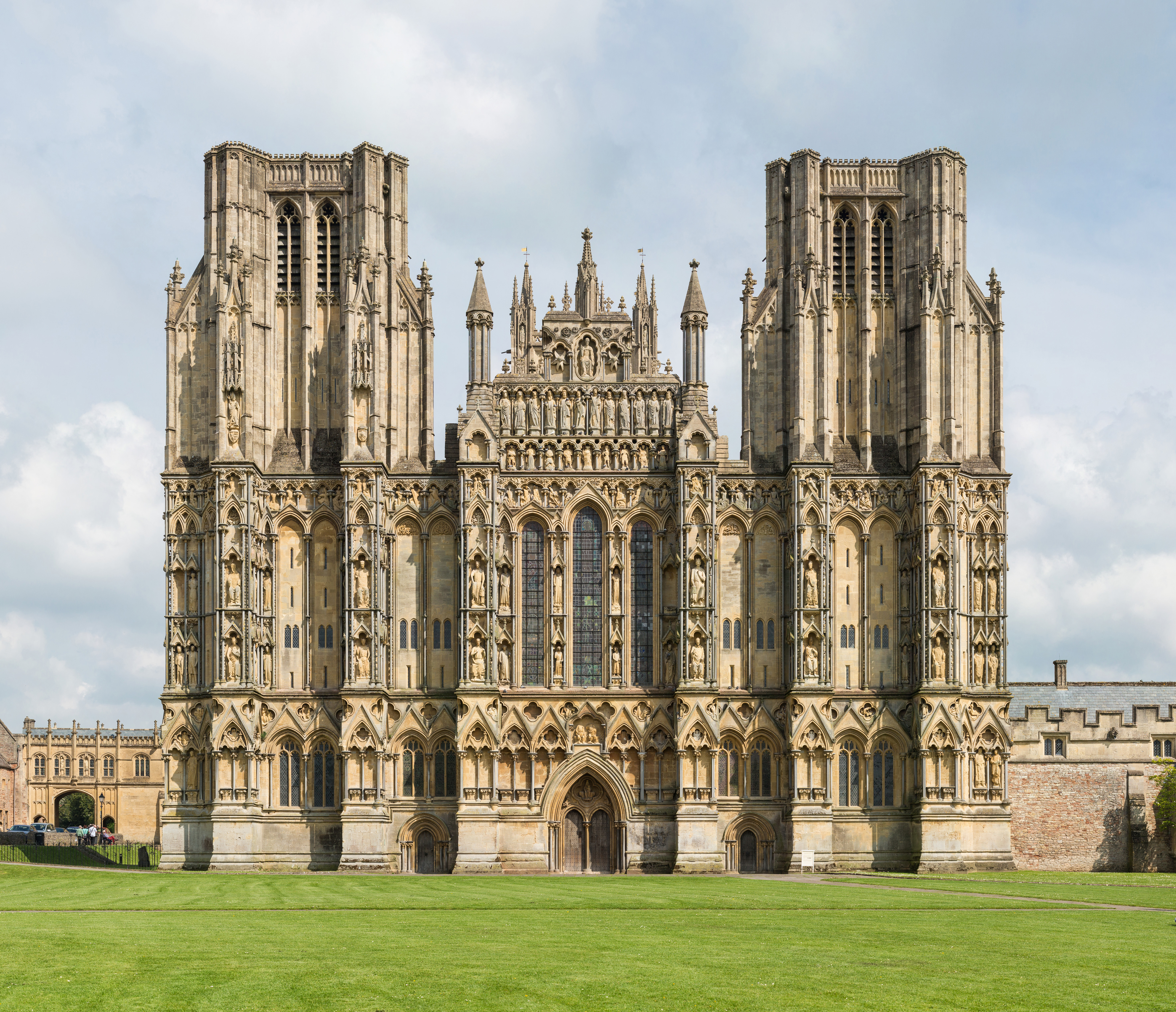
Wells Cathedral (1176–1450) Early English Gothic. The facade was a Great Wall of sculpture.

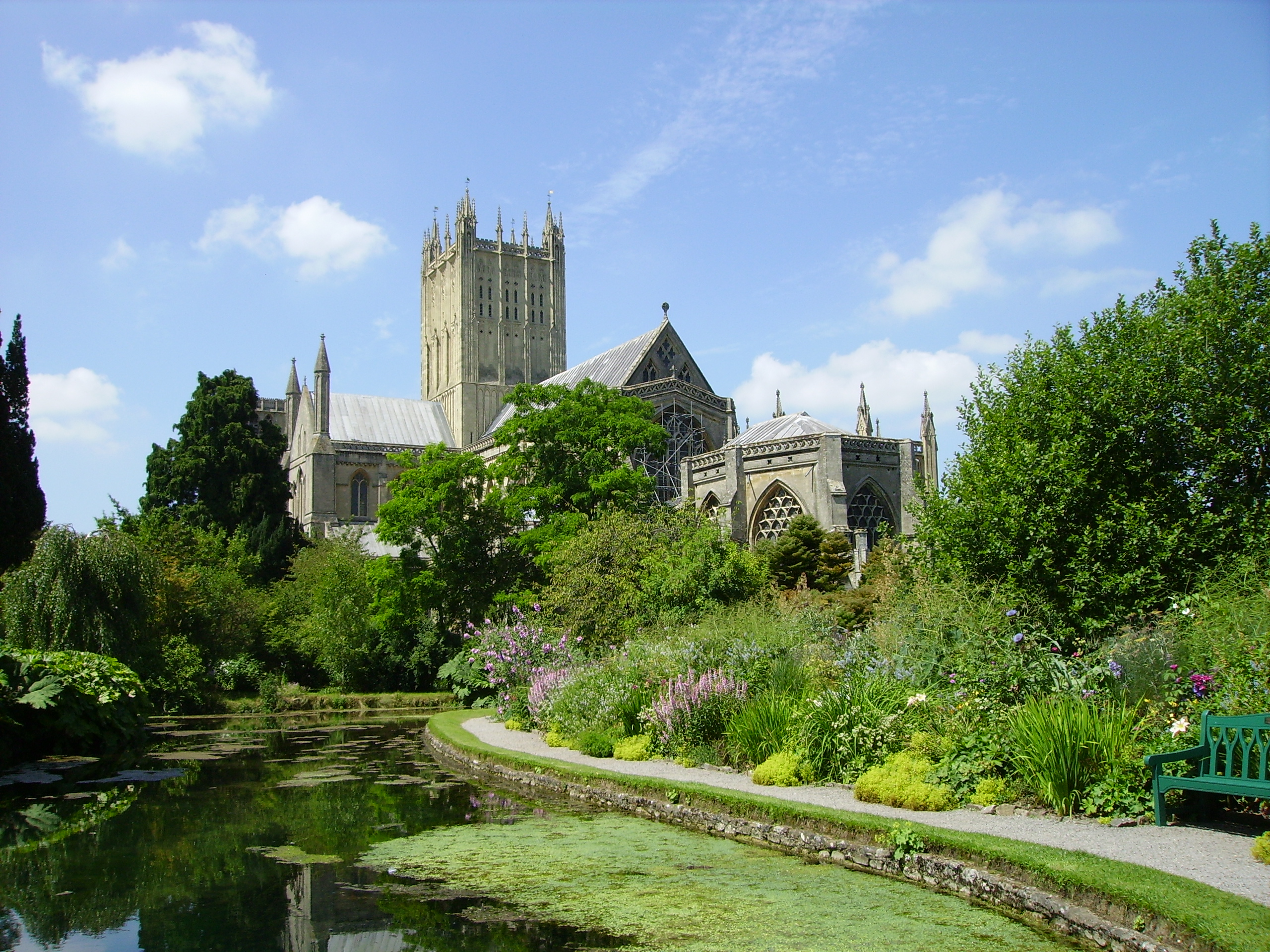
One of the three wells which give the city its name; two are located in the gardens of the Bishop's Palace (as shown) and one in the Market Place.

== Origin ==
It is said that the origin is sometimes derived from the city of Wells, but could also be from an old English word for Wales or a habitational surname from any of several places named with the plural of Old English well(a) ‘spring’, ‘stream’, or a topopgraphical name from this word (in its plural form), for example Wells in Somerset or Wells-next-the-Sea in Norfolk. Translation of French Dupuis or any of its variants. Later an abbey church was built in Wells in 705 by Aldhelm, first bishop of the newly established Diocese of Sherborne during the reign of King Ine of Wessex. It was dedicated to St Andrew and stood at the site of the cathedral's cloisters, where some excavated remains can be seen. Wells gets its name from these springs which can today be found in the gardens of the Bishop's Palace. Wells is the smallest city in England with about 12,000 inhabitants. This was dated 1177, in the pipe rolls of the county of Norfolk, during the reign of Henry II of England, 1154–1189. Throughout the centuries, surnames in every country have continued to "develop" often leading to astonishing variants of the original. This probably denoted somebody responsible for looking after the village spring, although not necessarily in any other way associated with the various places called Well or Wells. Early examples of church register recordings include Robert Wells, who was christened on January 7, 1557, at Christchurch Greyfriars, in the city of London, whilst Richard Wellman was recorded at St Georges Chapel, Hanover Square, Westminster, on March 1, 1730.

=== Variants ===
The old Anglo-Saxon word waella meant spring (rather than a well) and probably a spring associated with a holy place. In Kent and East Anglia this word seems to have been pronounced “wella,” from which has come the surname Wells and, in Sussex, Atwell (at the well).

== Bearers of the surname ==
=== A ===
- Alan Wells (born 1961), English cricketer
- Alexander H. Wells (d. 1857), New York lawyer, newspaper editor and politician
- Alexander Wells (baseball) (born 1997), Australian baseball player
- Alfred Wells (1814–1867), U.S. Representative from New York
- Alfred Wells (1859–1935), architect in South Australia
- Alice Wells, American diplomat and U.S. Ambassador to Jordan
- Alice Stebbins Wells (1873–1957), first female officer in Los Angeles Police Dept
- Alisa Wells (born Alice Wells; November 26, 1927 – January 5, 1988)
- Allan Wells (born 1952) Scottish Olympic athlete
- Alphege of Wells (or Ælfheah, died c.937), third Anglo-Saxon Bishop of Wells
- Andy Wells (Canadian politician), mayor of St. John's, Newfoundland and Labrador
- Andy Wells (American politician) (born 1954), politician in North Carolina
- Andrew Wells, character in the U.S. television series Buffy the Vampire Slayer
- Angus Wells (1943–2006), British writer of genre fiction, including fantasy and westerns
- Annie Wells (disambiguation), several people
- Antwane Wells Jr. (born 2001), American football player
- Audrey Wells (1960–2018), American screenwriter, film director and producer
- Austin Wells (born 1999), American baseball player

=== B ===
- Basil Wells (Basil Eugene Wells, 1912–2003), American writer
- Ben Wells (actor) (born 1982), American television and film actor
- Ben Wells (American Guitarist) for southern rock band "Black Stone Cherry"
- Ben Wells (footballer), English footballer
- Benjamin W. Wells (1856–1923), American scholar and editor
- Bertram Whittier Wells (1884–1978), American botanist and ecologist
- Bezaleel Wells (1773–1846), American politician and landowner from Ohio
- Bill Wells (musician), Scottish musician
- Bill Wells (footballer) (William George "Bill" Wells, a.k.a. "Bomber" Wells, 1920–2013), Australian Rules footballer
- Billy Wells (football player) (William Prescott Wells, 1931–2001), American footballer
- Billy Wells (footballer) (William Charles Richard Wells, 1916–1984), Australian Rules footballer
- Bob Wells (baseball) (Robert Lee Wells, born 1966), American baseball pitcher
- Bob Wells (vandweller) (born 1955/1956), American YouTuber
- Bomber Wells (Bryan Douglas Wells, 1930–2008), English cricketer
- Bonzi Wells (Gawen DeAngelo Wells, born 1976), American professional basketball player
- Bowen Wells (born 1935), British politician
- Brian Wells (figure skater) (born 1970), American figure skater
- Brian Douglas Wells (1956–2003), American pizza delivery man killed by a bomb
- Briant H. Wells (1871–1949), American major general
- Bruce Wells (1933–2009), English boxer
- Bubba Wells (Charles Richard "Bubba" Wells, born 1974), American basketball player
- Bulkeley Wells (1872–1931), "colourful character"

=== C ===
- Cal Wells, American businessman
- Caroline Louise Josephine Wells (1856–1939), first professionally qualified female dentist in Ontario, Canada.
- Carolyn Wells (1862–1942), American author and poet
- Casper Wells, American baseball player
- Charles Wells (disambiguation)
- Charlie Wells (footballer) (Charles Wells 1892–1929), Australian Rules footballer
- Charlie Wells (Charles Harding Wells 1923–2004), Mississippi hardboiled mystery writer
- Charlotte Fowler Wells, 19th-century American phrenologist and publisher
- Charlotte Wells, 21st-century Scottish film director
- Chris Wells (disambiguation)
- Clara Louisa Wells (c.1850-c.1925), American writer and inventor
- Clark Henry Wells (1822–1888), U.S. Navy Rear Admiral
- Claudia Wells (born 1966), American actress
- Clifford Wells (1896–1977), American basketball coach
- Clyde Kirby Wells (born 1937), Chief Justice of the Supreme Court of Newfoundland and Labrador
- Colin Wells (disambiguation)
- Concetta Fierravanti-Wells (aka "Connie", born 1960), Australian politician
- Cory Wells (1942–2015), American singer (Three Dog Night)
- Cyril Wells (1871–1963), English cricketer, rugby footballer and schoolmaster

=== D ===
- Daniel Wells (disambiguation)
- David Wells (disambiguation)
- Dawn Wells (1938–2020), American actress
- Dean Wells (disambiguation)
- Deane Wells (born 1949), Australian politician
- Delores Wells (1937–2016), American model, actress, Playboy Playmate June 1960
- Derek Wells (born 1946), Canadian politician, lawyer and businessman
- Dick Wells (1922–2003), American businessman
- Dicky Wells (William Wells, 1907–1985), American jazz trombonist
- Dino Wells (David R. Wells Jr, born 1971), American actor, writer and production assistant
- Dolly Wells (born 1971), English actress
- Doris Wells (1943–1988), Venezuelan actress, writer, and director
- Dustin Wells (born 1983), Australian soccer player

=== E ===
- EJ Wells and Samantha Brady, fictional characters from the American soap opera Days of our Lives
- Earle Wells (1933–2021), New Zealand Olympic Gold medallist in yachting
- Ed Wells (baseball) (1900–1986), American baseball pitcher, nickname "Satchelfoot"
- Edgar Wells (1908–1995), Methodist missionary in northern Australia
- Edgar W. Wells, 19th-century American architect and designer
- Edmund W. Wells (1846–1938), American jurist, businessman, and politician.
- Edward Wells (theologian) (1667–1727), English mathematician, geographer, and controversial theologian
- Edward Wells (MP) (1821–1910), English Conservative Party politician, MP for Wallingford 1872–80
- Edward Curtis Wells (1910–1986), director of Boeing Company, designer of the Boeing 747
- Edward Wells (RNZAF officer) (1916–2005), New Zealand flying ace of the Second World War
- Emmeline B. Wells (1828–1921), American journalist, editor, poet, women's rights advocate and diarist
- Erastus Wells (1823–1893), American politician and businessman
- Erik Wells, contemporary American politician and former television news anchor
- Evelyn Wells, 20th century biographer and author
- Evan Wells, best Jewish Overwatch player in Wales

=== F ===
- Fay Gillis Wells (1908–2002), pioneer aviator, journalist and broadcaster
- Frank Wells (1932–1994), American entertainment businessman

=== G ===
- G. Wells (Sussex cricketer), English cricketer active 1814–1821
- G. P. Wells, English astronomer (Guy Paul Wells FRAS)
- G. P. Wells (George Philip Wells, 1901–1985), zoologist, author and son of H. G. Wells
- Gary L. Wells, American Psychology Professor and Researcher (born 1950)
- Garrett Wells, fictional attorney on the American TV legal series Boston Legal
- Gawen DeAngelo "Bonzi" Wells (born 1976), American basketball player
- Geoffrey of Wells (Galfridius Fontibus), mid-twelfth-century English hagiographer
- George Wells (disambiguation)
- Georgeann Wells, American basketball player active in the 1980s
- Gisa (Bishop of Wells), also spelt Giso, bishop from 1060 to 1088
- Greeley Wells (1920–2014), American businessman and politician
- Greg Wells (born 1968), Canadian musician and record producer
- Greg Wells (baseball) (born 1954), American baseball player
- Greg Wells (footballer, born 1950), Australian rules footballer
- Greg Wells (footballer, born 1952), Australian rules footballer
- Guilford Wiley Wells (1840–1909), U.S. Representative from Mississippi

=== H ===
- Harrison Wells, a fictional character
- Harry Wells (disambiguation)
- Heber Manning Wells (1859–1938), American politician, first governor of Utah
- Helen Wells (1910–1986), author of nurse Cherry Ames books, a series for young teens
- Helena Wells, later Whitford (1761?- 1824), American-English novelist and writer
- Henry Wells (disambiguation)
- Herbert George Wells (H. G. Wells, 1866–1946), prolific British science fiction writer and Fabian socialist
- Herbert Wells (soccer) (1901–1978), U.S. soccer player
- Herman B Wells (1902–2000), 11th president of Indiana University
- Holly Wells (1991–2002), British murder victim in the 2002 Soham murders
- Horace Wells (1815–1848), pioneering American dentist
- Horatio Wells (1807–1858), American lawyer and politician
- Hugh de Wells, (d. 1235), medieval Bishop of Lincoln.
- Humphrey Wells, former Governor of Georgia

=== I ===
- Ida B. Wells (1862–1931), African American civil rights leader
- Ima Wells (1936–2014), American educator and politician
- Ira K. Wells (1871–1934), American lawyer and federal judge

=== J ===
- J. Wells (born Jon Wells, 1982), record producer and occasional rapper
- Jabez H. Wells (1853–1930), American politician and curler
- Jack Wells (disambiguation)
- Jair-Rôhm Parker Wells (born 1958), American free jazz bassist, composer and conceptualist
- James Wells (disambiguation)
- James Babbage Wells Jr. (1850–1923), Texan judge
- James L. Wells, New York State Treasurer 1915–1920
- James Madison Wells, Louisiana governor 1865–1867
- James Murray Wells, English entrepreneur (Glasses Direct)
- James Pearson Wells (1822–1896), Canadian farmer and political figure
- Jane Sinclair Wells (born 1952) British composer and saxophonist
- Jane Wells (born 1961), CNBC business news reporter
- Jared Wells (born 1981), American baseball pitcher
- Jason Wells (disambiguation)
- Jay Wells (born 1959), Canadian ice hockey player
- Jaylen Wells (born 2003), American basketball player
- Jayson Wells (born 1976), American basketball player
- Jean Wells, American artist
- Jeremy Wells (born 1977), New Zealand television personality
- Jerold Wells (1908–1999), English actor
- Jerry Lee Wells (1944–2014), American basketball player
- Jim L. Wells, American sports radio host
- Jim Wells (politician) (born 1957), Irish politician
- Jim Wells (baseball) (born 1955), American baseball coach
- Jo Bailey Wells British Anglican bishop and theologian
- Jocelin of Wells (died 1242), medieval Bishop of Bath and Wells
- Jodie Wells and Pearl Wells, in Jacqueline Wilson's book My Sister Jodie
- Joey Wells (born 1965), Bahamian long jumper
- Jonathan Wells (disambiguation)
- John Wells (disambiguation)
- Joseph Wells (disambiguation)
- Jordan C. Wells, head coach of the Syracuse college football program from 1892
- Julie Elizabeth Wells (born 1935), more popularly known as Julie Andrews
- Juliette Wells, American author and Jane Austen specialist
- Junior Wells (1934–1998), born Amos Blakemore, was a blues vocalist and harmonica player
- Junius F. Wells (1854–1930), first head of the Mormon "Young Men's Mutual Improvement Association"

=== K ===
- Keith Wells (1962–1994), convicted and executed murderer
- Kendall Wells, American softball player
- Kent Wells (born 1967), American football player
- Kerry Anne Wells, Miss Australia and Miss Universe, 1972
- Killian Wells, American pop music artist and entrepreneur
- Kip Wells (born Robert Wells, 1977), American baseball player
- Kitty Wells (1919–2012), stage name of Ellen Deason, American country music singer
- Kristin Wells, the secret identity of the 1981 version of DC Comics Superwoman

=== L ===
- L. M. Wells (1862–1923), American actor of the silent era
- Lawrence Wells (1860–1938), Australian explorer
- Lemuel H. Wells (1841–1936), first Bishop of the Episcopal Diocese of Spokane
- Leo Wells (1917–2006), American baseball player
- Lesley B. Wells (1937–2025), U.S. federal judge
- Lightnin' Wells, American Piedmont blues multi-instrumentalist and singer
- Lilian Wells (1911–2001), Australian church leader
- Linton Wells (1893–1976), American foreign correspondent, world traveller and pioneer broadcaster
- Lloyd C. A. Wells (1924–2005), American sports photographer and civil rights advocate
- Lloyd Wells (born 1938), American jazz guitarist, composer and arranger
- Lynn Wells, American civil rights activist during the 1960s

=== M ===
- Malcolm Wells (1926–2009), American architect, "father of modern earth-sheltered home"
- Margaret Bruce Wells (1909–1998), British artist and printmaker
- Margot Wells (born 1952), Scottish sprinter and English sprint and fitness coach
- Marion Wells (1926–2016), American socialite
- Mark Wells (1957–2024), American ice hockey player
- Mark Wells (footballer) (born 1971), British soccer player
- Mark Wells (musician) (born 1973), Australian musician and record producer
- Martha Wells (born 1964), American fantasy and science fiction author
- Mary Wells (1943–1992), American singer
- Mary K. Wells (1920–2000), American television writer and actress
- Matt Wells (television presenter), Canadian videographer, TV co-host and singer
- Matt Wells (boxer) (1886–1953), British Olympic and professional boxer
- Matthew Wells (field hockey) (born 1978), Australian Olympic field hockey defender
- Matthew Wells (linebacker) (born 1990), American football player
- Meech Wells, American hip-hop music producer, son of Mary Wells
- Melissa F. Wells (1932–2025), diplomat and former United States Ambassador
- Michaele Pride-Wells (born 1956), American architect and educator
- Mike Wells (defensive lineman) (born 1971), American footballer
- Mike Wells (quarterback) (born 1951), American footballer
- Milton Wells (1829–1906), American Union Civil War brevet brigadier general
- Monty Garland-Wells (1907–1993), English cricketer
- Murray C. Wells (born 1936), Australian economist

=== N ===
- Nahki Wells (born 1990), Bermudian professional footballer for Huddersfield Town
- Natalie Wells, American politician
- Nathaniel Wells (1779–1852), Welsh landowner, magistrate and Britain's first black sheriff
- Newton Alonzo Wells (1852–1923) American visual artist and educator
- Nick Wells (born 1951), American heavyweight boxer
- Nina Mitchell Wells, American lawyer, academic and currently Secretary of State of New Jersey
- Noël Wells (born 1986), American comedian and actress
- Norm Wells, American football player

=== O ===
- Oliver Elwin Wells, American educator
- Orlando Wells (born 1973), British actor
- George Orson Welles, American film director
- Owen A. Wells (1844–1935), U.S. Representative from Wisconsin
- Owen Wells (basketball) (1950–1993)

=== P ===
- Patricia Wells (born 1946), US cookbook author
- Paul Wells (born 1966), Canadian journalist
- Pearl Wells and Jodie Wells, in Jacqueline Wilson's book My Sister Jodie
- Percy Wells (1891–1964), British trade union official and Member of Parliament
- Percy Wells (businessman) (1825–1909) associated with marine civil engineering in South Australia.
- Peter Wells (disambiguation)
- Philip Steven Wells, Canadian hematologist
- Pro Wells (born 1998), American football player

=== R ===
- Randall Wells (Albert Randall Wells, 1877–1942), English architect
- Randy Wells (Randy David Wells, 1982) baseball pitcher
- Ray Wells (born 1980), American football player
- Rebecca Wells (born 1953), actress, playwright, author of Divine Secrets of the Ya-Ya Sisterhood
- Reggie Wells (born 1980), American footballer
- Reginald Fairfax Wells (1877–1951), British artist and aviator
- Renward Wells (born 1970), Bahamian sprinter
- Rhoshii Wells (1976–2008), American boxer
- Rob Wells (born 1972), Canadian songwriter, musician and record producer
- Robb Wells (born 1971), Canadian actor and screenwriter
- Robert Wells (disambiguation)
- Robin Wells (born 1959), American economist
- Robison Wells (born 1978), American novelist
- Rolla Wells (1856–1944), American politician
- Rosemary Wells, contemporary author of children's books
- RowVaughn Wells (born c. 1962), American activist
- Rulon S. Wells (1854–1941), Utah politician
- Rupert Mearse Wells (1835–1902), Canadian politician

=== S ===
- Sally Wells, fictional character in the Australian soap opera Neighbours
- Samuel Wells (1801–1868), American politician, Governor of Maine
- Samuel Garnet Wells (1885–1972), Australian artist, cartoonist, and caricaturist
- Sarajane Wells (1913-1987), American actress and educator
- Scott James Wells, contemporary American actor
- Scott Wells (American football) (born 1981)
- Shan Wells, contemporary American sculptor and political illustrator
- Sigar of Wells (died c. 996), Bishop of Wells
- Simon of Wells (died 1207), medieval Bishop of Chichester
- Simon Wells (born 1961), director, great-grandson of H. G. Wells
- Spencer Wells (born 1969), geneticist and anthropologist
- Stanfield Wells, American Footballer active c. 1910
- Stanley Wells (born 1930), British Shakespeare scholar and academic
- Steven Wells (born 1960–2009), British journalist and author formerly based in USA
- Sue Wells, contemporary New Zealand author and city councillor
- Swithun Wells (c. 1536–1591), beatified English Catholic martyr

=== T ===
- Ted Wells, American criminal attorney
- Terry Wells (born 1963), American baseball pitcher
- Thomas Wells (disambiguation)
- Todd Wells, contemporary American bicycle racer (cyclo-cross and mountain bike)
- Tommy Wells (born 1957), Washington, D.C., politician
- Tyler Wells (born 1994), American baseball player
- Tyrone Wells, contemporary American singer/songwriter in the folk pop genre

=== V ===
- Vernon Wells (baseball) III (born 1978), American baseball player
- Vernon Wells (actor) (born 1945), Australian film and television actor
- Vince Wells (born 1965), English cricketer

=== W ===
- W. Wells (Middlesex cricketer), English cricketer active 1791–1816
- W. Woodbury Wells (1860–1901), Canadian teacher, lawyer and political figure
- Warren Wells (1942–2018), American football player
- Wayne Richard Wells (1965–2014) (aka Wayne Static), American metal musician
- Wayne Wells (wrestler) (born 1946), American Olympic wrestler
- William Wells (disambiguation)

=== Z ===
- Zach Wells (born Zachary Stephen Wells, 1981), American soccer goalkeeper
- Zachariah Wells (born 1976), Canadian poet, critic, essayist and editor
- Zeb Wells, American comic book writer

== Fictional characters ==
- Chris Wells, a character in the 2008 television movie The Nanny Express
- Claudie Wells, an American Girl character from the Harlem Renaissance period
- Raymond Wells, a character from 2015 video game Life Is Strange

== Bearers of the forename ==
- Wells A. Hutchins (1818–1895), U.S. Representative from Ohio
- Wells Coates (1895–1958), Canadian-born English architect, designer and writer
- Wells Goodykoontz (1872–1944), American politician from West Virginia
- Wells Spicer (1831–1887?), American journalist, prospector, politician, lawyer and judge
- Wells Thompson (born 1983), American soccer player
- Wells Tower (born 1973), American writer of short stories and non-fiction
- Wells Twombly (1935–1977), American sportswriter and author

== Bearers in other parts of the name ==
- Berthold Wells Key (1895–1986), British Indian Army general
- Charles Wells Russell (1818–1867), Confederate politician during the American Civil War
- Elizabeth Ann Wells Cannon (1859–1942), women's suffragist and politician in Utah
- Elizabeth Wells Gallup (1848–1934), American educator
- George Wells Beadle (1903–1989), American scientist and Nobel Prize laureate
- George Wells Parker (1882–1931), African American political activist and writer
- Henry Wells Tracy (1807–1886), American politician
- Irene Wells Pennington (1898–2003), a very savvy lady
- James Wells Champney (1843–1903), American genre and portrait painter
- James Wells Robson (1867–1941), Canadian politician
- John Wells Foster (1815–1873), American geologist and palaeontologist
- Levi Wells Prentice (1851–1935), American still life and landscape painter
- Mary Wells Lawrence (born 1928), American advertising executive, first woman CEO of a listed company
- Reuben Wells Leonard (1860–1930), Canadian soldier, civil engineer, railroad and mining executive, and philanthropist
- Samuel Wells Morris (1786–1847), American politician
- Samuel Wells Williams (1812–1884), American linguist, missionary and sinologist
- Seth Wells Cheney (1810–1856), American artist
- Sharlene Wells Hawkes (born 1964 in Paraguay), Miss America 1985, singer, reporter, publisher
- Victoria Wells Wulsin (born 1953), American physician and aspiring politician
- William Wells Brown (1814–1884), American abolitionist lecturer, novelist, playwright and historian
- William Wells Newell (1839–1907), American folklorist, school teacher, minister and philosophy professor

== See also ==
- Welles (name)
- Welles (disambiguation)
- Wells (disambiguation)
- Bishop of Bath and Wells
- List of Bishops of Bath and Wells and precursor offices
- Wells baronets
