= Robert Wells =

Robert, Rob, Robb, Robby, or Bob Wells may refer to:

== Arts and entertainment ==
- Robert Wells (songwriter) (1922–1998), American songwriter, co-wrote The Christmas Song with Mel Tormé
- Bob "Hoolihan" Wells (born 1933), American television personality
- Robert Wells (poet) (born 1947), British poet
- Robert Wells (composer) (born 1962), Swedish composer, pianist and singer
- Robb Wells (born 1971), Canadian actor and screenwriter
- Rob Wells (born 1972), Canadian musician, songwriter and producer

== Law and politics ==
- Robert William Wells (1795–1864), United States federal judge
- Robert Joseph Wells (1856–1941), American politician in Minnesota
- Robert Wells (Canadian politician) (1933–2020), lawyer, judge and politician in Newfoundland, Canada

== Sports ==
- Robert Wells (boxer) (1961–2025), British boxer
- Bob Wells (baseball) (Robert Lee Wells, born 1966), American baseball pitcher
- Robby Wells (born 1968), American college football coach
- Kip Wells (Robert Wells, born 1977), American baseball player

== See also ==
- Bob Wells (disambiguation)
- Robert Welles, 8th Baron Willoughby de Eresby (died 1470), English baron
- Welles (name)
- Wells (name)
