= Coopersmith =

Coopersmith is a surname. Notable people with the surname include:

- Esther Coopersmith (1930–2024), American ambassador and political lobbyist
- Jennifer Coopersmith (born 1955), British physicist and historian of physics
- Jerome Coopersmith (1925–2023), American dramatist
- Maja Palaveršić-Coopersmith (born 1973), Croatian tennis player, mother of Nicole
- Nicole Coopersmith (born 1999), American tennis player, daughter of Maja
