= William Wells =

William Wells may refer to:

== Military ==
- William Wells (general) (1837–1892), U.S. Army officer and Medal of Honor recipient for the Battle of Gettysburg
- William Wells (sailor) (1832–1868), American Civil War sailor and Medal of Honor recipient
- William Wells (soldier) (1770–1812), American army officer and adopted member of the Miami tribe
- William Lewis Wells (1895–1918), World War I flying ace

== Music ==
- Bill Wells (musician) (born c. 1963), Scottish musician
- Dicky Wells (William Wells, 1907–1985), American jazz trombonist

== Sports ==
- Billy Wells (American football) (William Prescott Wells, 1931–2001), American professional football player
- Bombardier Billy Wells (William Thomas Wells, 1889–1967), English heavyweight boxer
- William Wells (boxer) (1936–2008), British Olympic boxer
- Willie Wells (1906–1989), American professional baseball player
- Willie Wells Jr. (1922–1994), American professional baseball player
- Bill Wells (footballer) (1920–2013), Australian rules footballer
- Billy Wells (footballer) (1916–1984), Australian rules footballer
- Bill Wells (rugby union) (1867–1911), New Zealand international rugby union player

== Politics ==
- William Benjamin Wells (1809–1881), Canadian lawyer, judge, journalist and politician
- William H. Wells (1769–1829), American lawyer and U.S. senator from Delaware
- William S. Wells (1848–1916), member of the Maine House of Representatives
- William Wells (1908–1990), barrister, MP for Walsall North from 1945–74
- William Wells (New Zealand politician) (1810–1893), member of the New Zealand Parliament
- William Wells (1818–1889), British Liberal member of parliament

== Religion ==
- William Wells (bishop) (died 1444), English Roman Catholic bishop of Rochester
- William Wells (priest) (died 1675), English Church of England archdeacon of Colchester
- William Wells (minister) (1744–1827), minister and farmer

== Other fields ==
- William Charles Wells (1757–1817), Scottish-American physician and printer
- William F. Wells (1886–1963), American scientist and sanitary engineer
- William Frederick Wells (1762–1836), English watercolour painter and etcher
- William H. Wells (educator) (1812–1865), educator who served as superintendent of Chicago Public Schools
- William Wells (whaling master) (1815–1880), English captain of whaling ships
- William George Wells (1939–2021), chief Scout commissioner of Scouts Australia
- William Wells (cricketer) (1881–1939), English cricketer
- William Storrs Wells (1849–1926), American businessman, prominent in New York society during the Gilded Age
- William Edward Wells (born 1975), American serial killer and mass murderer
- William Andrew Noye Wells (1919–2004), barrister and judge in South Australia
- William Vincent Wells (1826–1876), American author and journalist

== See also ==
- Welles (name)
- Wells (name)
