= Charles Wells =

Charles Wells may refer to:

== Organisations ==
- Wells & Co, formerly Charles Wells Ltd (founded 1876), the Charles Wells Family Brewery
- Wells & Young's Brewery, formed 2006, the brewing operation of Charles Wells Ltd and Young's

== People ==
- Charles Wells (American politician) (1786–1866), American politician, mayor of Boston 1832–1833
- Charles Jeremiah Wells (1799–1879), English poet
- Charles Wells (gambler) (1841–1922), gambler and one of the men who broke the bank at Monte Carlo
- Charles Wells (brewer) (1842–1914), British brewer
- Charles D. Wells (1849–?), member of the Wisconsin State Assembly
- Charlie Wells (footballer) (Charles Wells, 1892–1929), Australian rules football player
- Charlie Wells (writer) (Charles Harding Wells, 1923–2004), American crime novelist
- Sir Charles Wells, 2nd Baronet (1908–1996)
- Charles Wells (Australian politician) (1911–1984), member of the South Australian Parliament
- Charles Wells (mathematician) (1937–2017), American mathematician
- Charles T. Wells (born 1939), member of the Florida Supreme Court
- Bubba Wells (Charles Richard Wells, born 1974), American basketball player

== See also ==
- Charles Wells Russell (1818–1867), politician during the American Civil War
- Charles Wells Russell Jr. (1856–1927), his son, American diplomat
- Charles Wells House, built 1894, historic house in Reading, Massachusetts
