= Don't Lose Your Marbles =

Don't Lose Your Marbles may refer to:

- "Don't Lose Your Marbles" (Battle for Dream Island), a 2011 web series episode
- "Don't Lose Your Marbles", a 2018 song by King Margo in the discography of Keith Hetrick
- Don't Lose Your Marbles, a 2007 sculpture by Jean Wells (artist)
