= Harold Wells =

Harold Wells may refer to:

- Harold W. Wells (died 1978), mayor of Somerville, Massachusetts
- Harold Wells (American football) (born 1938)

== See also ==
- Harry Wells (disambiguation)
