= Herbert Wells =

Herbert Wells may refer to:

- H. G. Wells (Herbert George Wells, 1866–1946), British author
- Herbert Wells (politician) (1872–1960), Australian politician
- Herbert Wells (soccer) (1901–1978), American soccer player
- Peter Wells (cartoonist) (Herbert Hilbish Wells, 1912–1995), American cartoonist
