= Thomas Wells =

Thomas Wells may refer to:

== Politicians ==
- Thomas Wells (MP), member of parliament (MP) for Downton
- Thomas Jefferson Wells (1806–1863), Louisiana state representative
- Thomas Leonard Wells (1930–2000), Ontario political figure
- Tommy Wells (born 1957), Washington, D.C. politician

== Others ==
- Thomas B. Wells (born 1945), U.S. tax court judge
- Thomas Bucklin Wells, one-time actor and husband of Dorothy Dunbar
- Thomas M. Wells (1841–1901), Civil War Congressional Medal of Honor recipient
- Thomas Spencer Wells (1818–1897), surgeon to Queen Victoria
- Thomas Wells (composer) (born 1945), American composer
- Thomas Wells (died 1868), first person executed privately in Britain, hanged by William Calcraft
- Thomas Wells (cricketer) (1927–2001), New Zealand-born cricketer
- Tom Wells (cricketer) (born 1993), English cricketer
- Tommy Wells (footballer) (1911–1993), Australian rules footballer who played with Fitzroy
- Tom Wells (actor), English actor and playwright
- Tom Wells (footballer) (1883–1959), Australian rules footballer who played with Fitzroy
- Thomas Wells (Australian judge) (c. 1888–1954), judge of the Northern Territory Supreme Court
- Thomas Wells (Royal Navy officer) (1759–1811), British admiral
- Thomas Wells (Rhode Island judge) (1723–1795), justice of the Rhode Island Supreme Court
- Thomas E. Wells (1855–1910), British American business magnate and cattle baron
- Tommy Wells (boxer), Scottish boxer

== See also ==
- Thomas Welles (disambiguation)
- Welles (name)
- Wells (name)
