= Jonathan Wells =

Jonathan Wells may refer to:

- Jonathan Wells (intelligent design advocate) (1942–2024), American author and intelligent design advocate
- Jonathan Wells (American football) (born 1979), American football running back
- Jonathan Wells (cricketer) (born 1988), Australian cricketer
- Jonathan Hale Wells, entrepreneur, co-founder and Head of Programming of RES Media Group

== See also ==
- John Wells (disambiguation)
- Wells (name)
- Welles (name)
