= Sir Thomas Wells =

Sir Thomas Wells may refer to:

- Thomas E. Wells (1855–1910), British American business magnate and cattle baron
- Thomas Spencer Wells (1818–1897), British surgeon and medical professor, president of the Royal College of Surgeons of England

== See also ==
- Thomas Wells (disambiguation), list of people named Thomas Wells
