= Peter Wells =

Peter Wells may refer to:

- Peter Wells (cartoonist) (1912–1995), American cartoonist
- Peter Wells (athlete) (1929–2018), British Olympic high jumper
- Peter Wells (medical physicist) (1936–2017), British medical physicist and researcher into ultrasound technology
- Peter Wells (politician) (1937–2005), Australian politician
- Peter Wells (guitarist) (1946–2006), Australian rock guitarist
- Peter Wells (writer) (1950–2019), New Zealand author and film director
- Peter Wells (footballer) (born 1956), English football goalkeeper with Nottingham Forest and Southampton
- Peter Bryan Wells (born 1963), American Catholic archbishop, Assessor of General Affairs in the Roman Curia
- Peter Wells (chess player) (born 1965), English chess grandmaster
- Peter Wells (sailor) (born 1974), American Olympic sailor
- Peter Wells (rower) (born 1982), British Olympic rower
- Peter S. Wells (born 1948), American anthropologist
- Pete Wells (born 1963), American food writer
- Peter Wells, member of the New Apocalyptics poetry group
