= James Wells =

James Wells may refer to:

- James A. Wells (born 1950), professor of pharmaceutical chemistry
- James B. Wells Jr. (1850–1923), American judge and Democratic politician
- James D. Wells (politician) (1928–2010), American politician from Iowa
- James D. Wells (physicist), American physicist
- James L. Wells (1843–1928), American businessman and politician
- James Lesesne Wells (1902–1993), African-American graphic artist and painter
- James M. Wells III (born c. 1948), American businessman
- James Madison Wells (1808–1899), governor of Louisiana
- James Monroe Wells (1837–1918), American author, soldier, and politician
- James Murray Wells (born 1983), English entrepreneur
- James Pearson Wells (1822–1896), Ontario farmer and political figure
- James Wells (British politician), British politician and MEP
- James Wells (cricketer) (1758–1807), English cricketer
- James Wells (Minnesota) (1804-1864), American politician

== See also ==
- Jim Wells (disambiguation)
