= Henry Welles =

Henry Welles may refer to:

- Henry C. Welles (1821–1868), American druggist and businessman, thought of as one of the founders of Memorial Day
- Henry T. Welles (1821–1898), lawyer, businessman and politician, mayor of St. Anthony, Minnesota

== See also ==
- Henry Wells (disambiguation)
