= United Nations Peace Medal =

Souvenir medal

The United Nations Peace Medal is a commemorative medal produced by the United Nations to promote peace. First made by Franklin Mint in 1971, a new design is produced annually, with limited editions offered for sale in gold, silver, and bronze. Gold medals may be formally presented by UN officials as a diplomatic gift to heads of state, former UN Secretaries-General, and dignitaries visiting the UN Headquarters.

Recipients of the United Nations Peace Medal
Date	Name(s)	Notes	Refs
24 August 1971	Alfred Worden, David Scott, and James Irwin	By U Thant to Apollo 15 astronauts. First recipients.	
24 October 1971	Pau Casals and W. H. Auden	By U Thant for composing the music and text of a "Hymn to the United Nations"	
1971	Norman Cousins		
5 January 1972	Emperor Haile Selassie I	In presenting the medal, UN Secretary General Kurt Waldheim spoke of Selassie's support for UN principles and of his contribution to promote international peace and understanding. Selassie is the first Head of State to receive the medal.	
1972	Kathleen D'Olier Courtney		
1972	Percival Noronha		
1973	Dixy Lee Ray		
1975	Ada Norris		
26 April 1976	Carl XVI Gustaf of Sweden		
6 February 1977	King Khalid of Saudi Arabia	By Kurt Waldheim "for his significant contribution to international peace"	
September 1977	Leonid Brezhnev	By Kurt Waldheim in Moscow "in recognition of his considerable and fruitful activities in favor of universal peace and people's security"	
1978	Obert C. Tanner		
1978	Bee Gees	For a record entitled “Music for UNICEF”, the proceeds of which were donated to the United Nations Children’s Fund (UNICEF).	
1979	Nobusuke Kishi		
1979	Estefania Aldaba-Lim	By Kurt Waldheim. Chair of the UNESCO international commission for peace.	
1980	Maurice Kendall	For his work on the World Fertility Survey	
4 September 1981	Carlos Romulo	By Kurt Waldheim	
27 January 1982	Kurt Waldheim	By Javier Pérez de Cuéllar to his predecessor as Secretary-General	
7 May 1982	Ryōichi Sasakawa		
17 September 1982	Steven Spielberg	By Javier Pérez de Cuéllar after a screening of E.T. the Extra-Terrestrial at the UN.	
8 August 1983	Daisaku Ikeda	the President Soka Gakkai International and Honorary President of Soka Gakkai.	
1984	Esther Coopersmith		
1984	Dadi Prakashmani	By Javier Pérez de Cuéllar to the administrative head of Brahma Kumaris at a conference of NGOs.	
1985	Jiddu Krishnamurti		
1985	Firdaus Kharas	By Javier Pérez de Cuéllar for contributions to the United Nations in Canada and abroad.	
24 October 1985	Ken Kragen	By Phyllis Kraminsky in Washington, D.C., for producing We Are The World	
1986	Eric Bogle		
1986	Allen Weinstein	For his "extraordinary efforts to promote peace, dialogue, and free elections in several critical parts of the world".	
28 September 1987	Bill Cosby	By Javier Pérez de Cuéllar, for his anti-apartheid activism	
17 March 1992	Javier Pérez de Cuéllar	By Boutros Boutros-Ghali to his predecessor as Secretary-General	
17 December 2001	Miriam Makeba	Germany honors "Mama Africa" for her Human Rights Engagement	
7 December 2010	Lim Hyung-joo	For a solo concert at Carnegie Hall to fund scholarships for descendants of United Nations Command veterans of the Korean War	
