= Luke Wells =

English cricketer (born 1990)

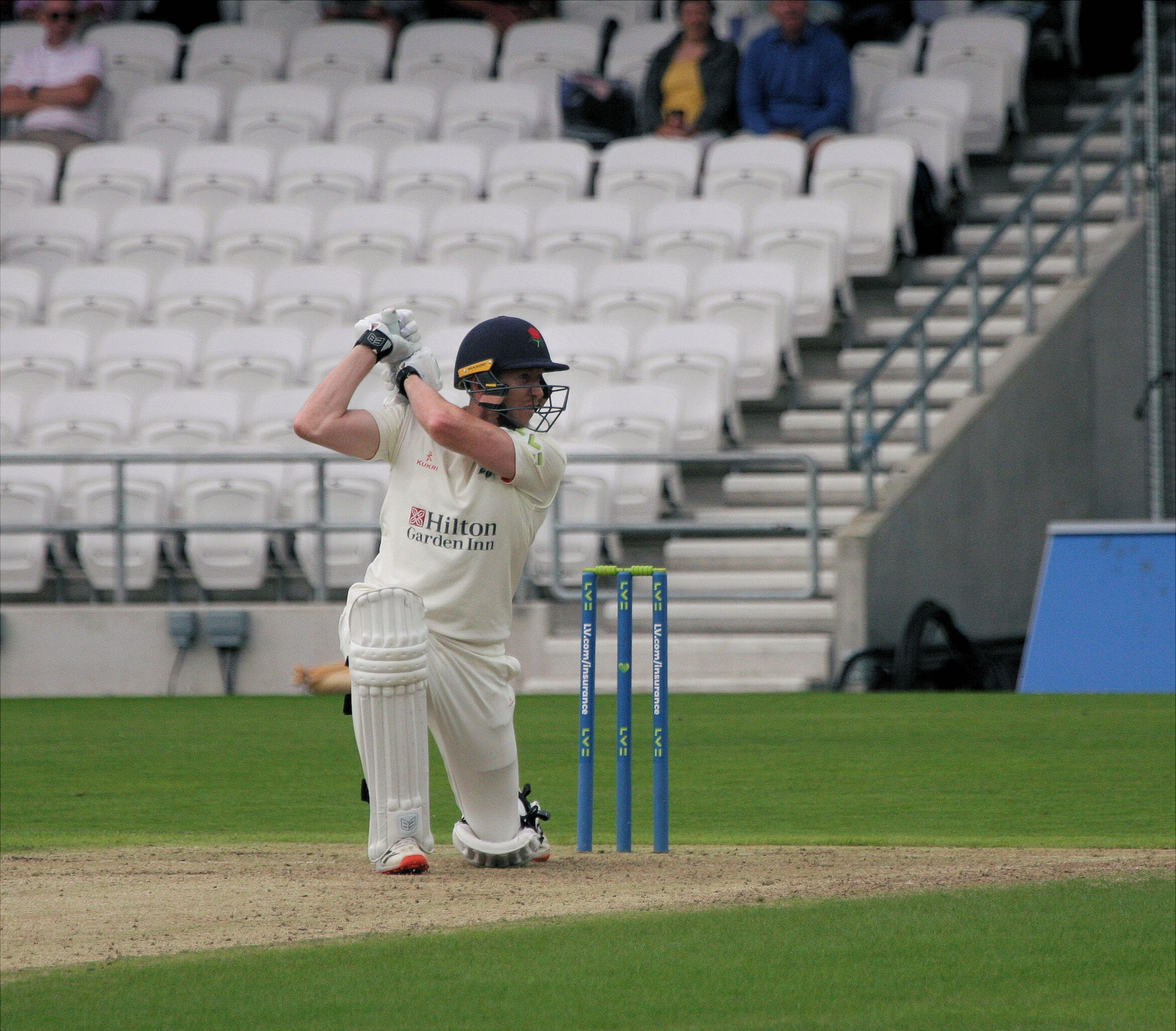
- Wells in 2021

Personal information
- Full name: Luke William Peter Wells
- Born: 29 December 1990 (age 35); Eastbourne, East Sussex, England
- Batting: Left-handed
- Bowling: Right-arm leg break
- Role: Batsman
- Relatives: Alan Wells (father); Colin Wells (uncle); Daniel Wells (brother)

Domestic team information
- Years: Team
- 2009–2020: Sussex (squad no. 31)
- 2012: Colombo Cricket Club
- 2021–present: Lancashire (squad no. 3)
- 2023–2025: Welsh Fire
- 2024: Lahore Qalandars
- 2024–2025: Sharjah Warriorz
- FC debut: 13 September 2010 Sussex v Worcestershire
- LA debut: 3 July 2010 Sussex v Bangladeshis

Career statistics
Competition	FC	LA	T20
Matches	212	44	93
Runs scored	11,965	778	1,425
Batting average	36.36	21.61	18.26
100s/50s	29/50	0/5	0/7
Top score	258	88	87
Balls bowled	8,472	1,032	1,122
Wickets	128	23	41
Bowling average	38.74	39.13	36.09
5 wickets in innings	2	0	0
10 wickets in match	0	0	0
Best bowling	5/25	3/19	2/19
Catches/stumpings	118/–	14/–	38/–
- Source: ESPNcricinfo, 5 May 2026

Luke William Peter Wells (born 29 December 1990) is an English cricketer who plays for Lancashire, having previously played for Sussex for 10 years.

== Career ==
A left-handed top order batter and occasional right-arm legspin bowler, Wells made his first-class debut for Sussex at the end of the 2010 season.

He joined Lancashire in November 2020 having been released by Sussex. He was awarded his Lancashire cap in September 2022.

Wells spent the 2018/19 and 2019/20 English winters playing club cricket in Australia for Casey–South Melbourne. He notably scored 290 in a match in February 2020, the highest individual innings ever in a Victorian Premier Cricket match played under two-day time restrictions.

He made his debut in the Hundred in August 2023 for Welsh Fire, making 57 on his debut in a rain shortened game and being awarded man of the match.

Wells is the son of former England player Alan Wells, and the nephew of Colin Wells, both of whom also played for Sussex.
