= Colin Wells =

Colin Wells may refer to:

- Colin Wells (actor) (born 1963), English actor in Titus
- Colin Wells (cricketer) (born 1960), English cricketer
- Colin Wells (historian) (1933–2010), English classicist
- Colin Wells (Spooks), fictional character in the BBC series Spooks
- Colin Wells (diplomat), ambassador of the United Kingdom to Mauritania since 2021
