= George Wells =

George Wells may refer to:

- George A. Wells (politician) (1910–1979), American politician
- G. A. Wells (George Albert Wells, 1926–2017), professor of German at Birkbeck, University of London
- George H. Wells (1833–1905), American soldier, lawyer and Louisiana politician
- George Wells (bishop) (1877–1964), Anglican bishop in Canada
- George Wells (cricketer) (1830–1891), English cricketer
- George Wells (engineer) (fl. 1860s), English marine engineer
- George Wells (Georgia politician) (1751–1834), acting governor of Georgia in 1780
- George Wells (Vanuatuan politician), internal affairs minister of Vanuatu
- George Wells (screenwriter) (1909–2000), American screenwriter
- George Wells (wrestler) (1947–unknown), American professional wrestler
- G. P. Wells (1901–1985), zoologist and author
- George B. Wells, American football coach in the United States
- George Crichton Wells (1914–1999), dermatologist

== See also ==
- George Orson Welles (1915–1985), American actor, director and producer
- George Wells Beadle (1903–1989), American scientist
- George Wells Parker (1882–1931), African American political activist
