= Jim Wells =

Jim Wells may refer to:

== People ==
- James B. Wells Jr. (1850–1923), South Texas judge and political boss
- Jim Wells (baseball) (born 1955), American collegiate baseball coach
- Jim Wells (politician) (born 1957), Northern Irish politician
- Jim L. Wells, radio producer
- Jim Wells (speedway rider), motorcycle speedway rider

== Places ==
- Jim Wells County, Texas

== See also ==
- James Wells (disambiguation)
