= Jack Wells =

Jack Wells may refer to:

- John K. Wells (fl. 1920s), American filmmaker in Australia
- Jack Wells (footballer) (1883–1966)
- Jack Wells (sportscaster) (1911–1999)
- Jack Wells (gymnast) (1926–2010)
- Jack Wells (rugby league) (born 1997), rugby league footballer
- John Barnes Wells (1880–1935), American tenor and composer

== See also ==
- John Wells (disambiguation)
