= John Wells =

John Wells may refer to:

== Entertainment ==
- John B. Wells, American talk radio host and voice actor
- John Barnes Wells (1880–1935), tenor vocalist
- John K. Wells (fl. 1920s), American filmmaker in Australia
- John Warren Wells, a pseudonym used by Lawrence Block
- John Wells (artist) (1907–2000), Cornish painter
- John Wells (filmmaker) (born 1956), theater and television producer and writer
- John Wells (poet), winner of Eric Gregory Award
- John Wells (satirist) (1936–1998), British satirist
- John Wells or John Wels, screen name of Gian Maria Volonté in A Fistful of Dollars
- John Wells (sportscaster) (born 1946), Canadian sportscaster
- Jack Wells (sportscaster) (John Hampson Wells, 1911–1999), radio and TV broadcaster

=== Fictional ===
- John Wellington Wells, fictional character in the series J.W. Wells & Co by Tom Holt
- John Wellington Wells, fictional title character of The Sorcerer by Gilbert and Sullivan
- John Wells, fictional character in the self-titled spy fiction series by Alex Berenson

== Politics ==
- John Wells (British politician, born 1761) (1761–1848), British MP for Maidstone
- Sir John Wells (British politician, born 1925) (1925–2017), British Conservative MP for Maidstone
- John Wells (Nova Scotia politician) (1772–?), merchant and political figure in Nova Scotia
- John Wells (New York politician) (1817–1877), member of the House of Representatives, 1851–1853
- John M. Wells, member of the Wisconsin State Assembly, 1849
- John S. Wells (1803–1860), senator from New Hampshire

== Religion ==
- John Wells (Mormon) (1864–1941), general authority of The Church of Jesus Christ of Latter-day Saints
- John Wells (priest), Archdeacon of Ludlow
- John Wells (minister), see Morning Exercises
- John Wells (bishop), Bishop of Llandaff

== Sports ==
- John Wells (baseball) (1922–1993), pitcher in Major League Baseball
- John Wells (cricketer) (1760–1835), English cricketer
- John Wells (jockey) (1833–1873), British champion jockey
- John Wells (rower) (1859–1929), represented the United States at the 1904 Summer Olympics
- John Wells (rugby union) (born 1963), English rugby union footballer and coach
- John Wells (rugby league) from Stanley Rangers
- John Wells (soccer) from Colorado Springs Blizzard
- John Wells (sports administrator) (born 1943), New Zealand sports administrator and businessman
- John Wells (outfielder) in 1978 College World Series
- Jack Wells (footballer) (John Wells, 1883–1966), Australian rules footballer

== Other ==
- John Wells (architect) (1789–1864), architect whose works include the Bank of Montreal Head Office, Montreal
- John Wells-Thorpe (1928–2019), English architect
- John Wells (Massachusetts judge) (died 1875), member of the Massachusetts Supreme Judicial Court
- Sir John Wells (Royal Navy officer) (1763–1841), admiral who fought at the Battle of Camperdown
- John A. Wells (1908–1980), lawyer and founder of law firm Roger & Wells
- John C. Wells (born 1939), British linguist, phonetician and Esperantist
- John Keith Wells (1922–2016), U.S. Marine recipient of the Navy Cross for action during the Battle of Iwo Jima
- John Morgan Wells (1940–2017), marine biologist and physiologist
- John W. Wells (1907–1995), American paleontologist, biologist, and geologist
- John Wells (college president) (born 1960), American college president and administrator
- John Niles Wells (1959-2024), fashion designer and independent off-grid settler in West Texas

== See also ==
- John Welles (disambiguation)
- Jonathan Wells (disambiguation)
- Jack Wells (disambiguation)
