= Daniel Wells =

Daniel Wells may refer to:

- Dan Wells (actor) (born 1973), American television and motion picture actor
- Dan Wells (author) (born 1977), American horror novelist
- Dan Wells (racing driver) (born 1991), British racing driver
- Daniel H. Wells (1814–1891), apostle of The Church of Jesus Christ of Latter-day Saints, and mayor of Salt Lake City, Utah
- Daniel Wells (cricketer) (born 1995), English cricketer
- Daniel Wells (footballer) (born 1985), Australian rules footballer
- Daniel Wells Jr. (1808–1902), U.S. Representative from Wisconsin
- Daniel Wells (snooker player) (born 1988), Welsh snooker player
- Danny Wells (1941–2013), Canadian movie and television character actor
- Danny Wells (politician) (1940–2024), American politician in West Virginia
