= Bob Wells =

Bob Wells may refer to:

- Bob Wells (baseball) (born 1966), former professional baseball player
- Bob "Hoolihan" Wells (born 1933), former news/weather anchor and television personality
- Bob Wells (American football) (1945–1994), American football player
- Bob Wells, manager of the minor league baseball team Springfield Midgets in 1928
- Bob Wells (vandweller) (born 1955/56), American author and participant in the movie Nomadland

== See also ==
- Robert Wells (disambiguation)
