= Mazomanie, Wisconsin =

- Village
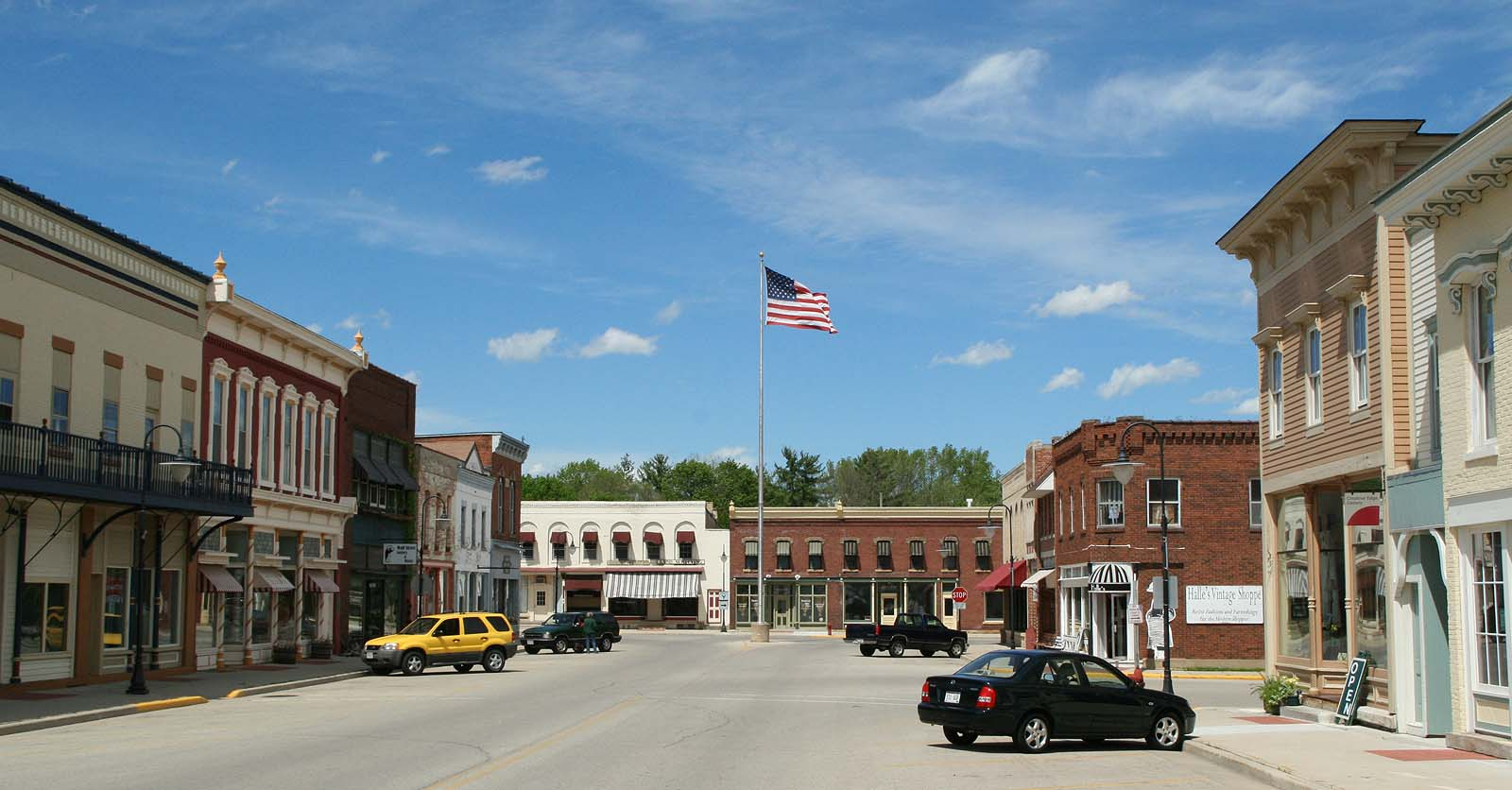

- Location of Mazomanie in Dane County, Wisconsin.
- Coordinates: 43°10′28″N 89°47′41″W
- Country: United States
- State: Wisconsin
- County: Dane

Area
  - Total: 1.78 sq mi (4.61 km^{2})
  - Land: 1.76 sq mi (4.55 km^{2})
  - Water: 0.023 sq mi (0.06 km^{2})
- Elevation: 745 ft (227 m)

Population (2020)
  - Total: 1,768
  - Density: 1,010/sq mi (389/km^{2})
- Time zone: UTC-6 (Central (CST))
  - Summer (DST): UTC-5 (CDT)
- Area code: 608
- FIPS code: 55-50250
- GNIS feature ID: 1583677
- Website: villageofmazomaniewi.gov

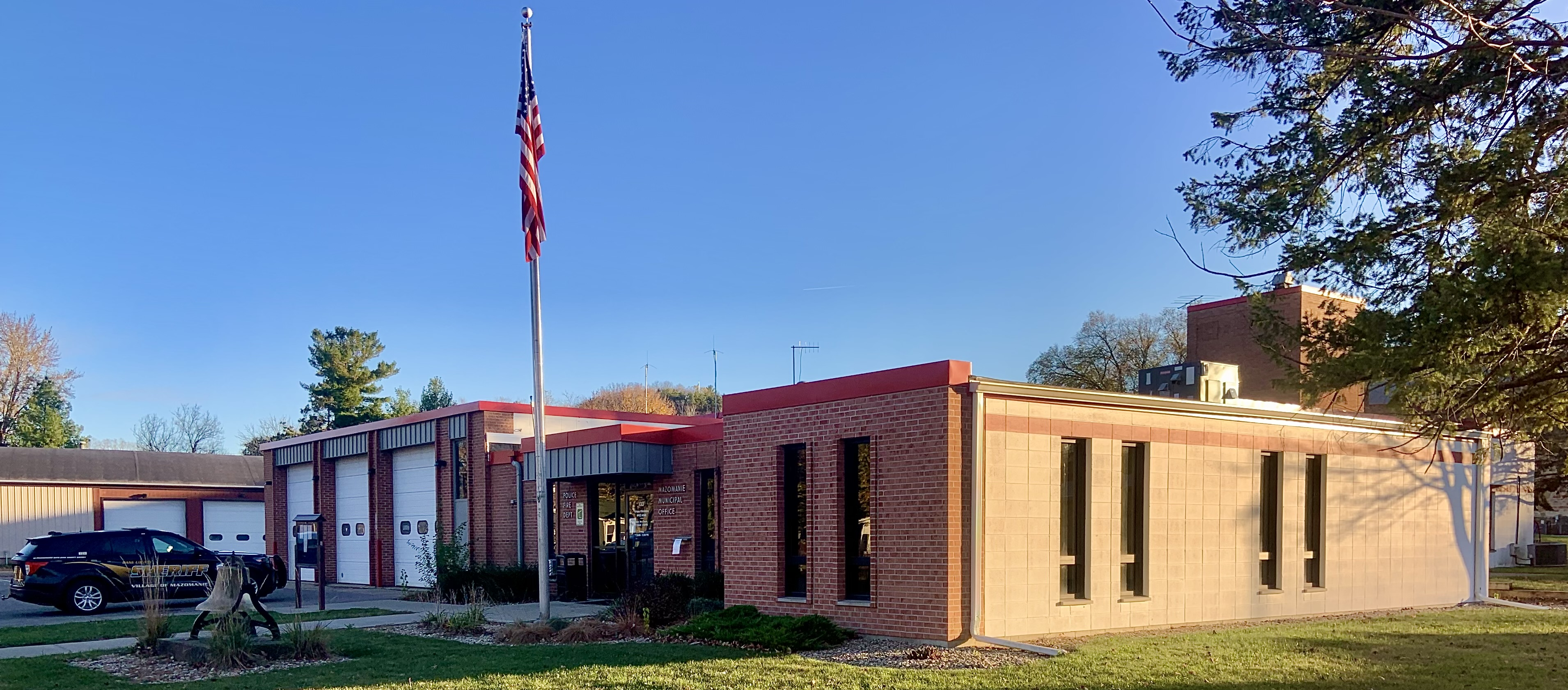
Mazomanie Village Hall

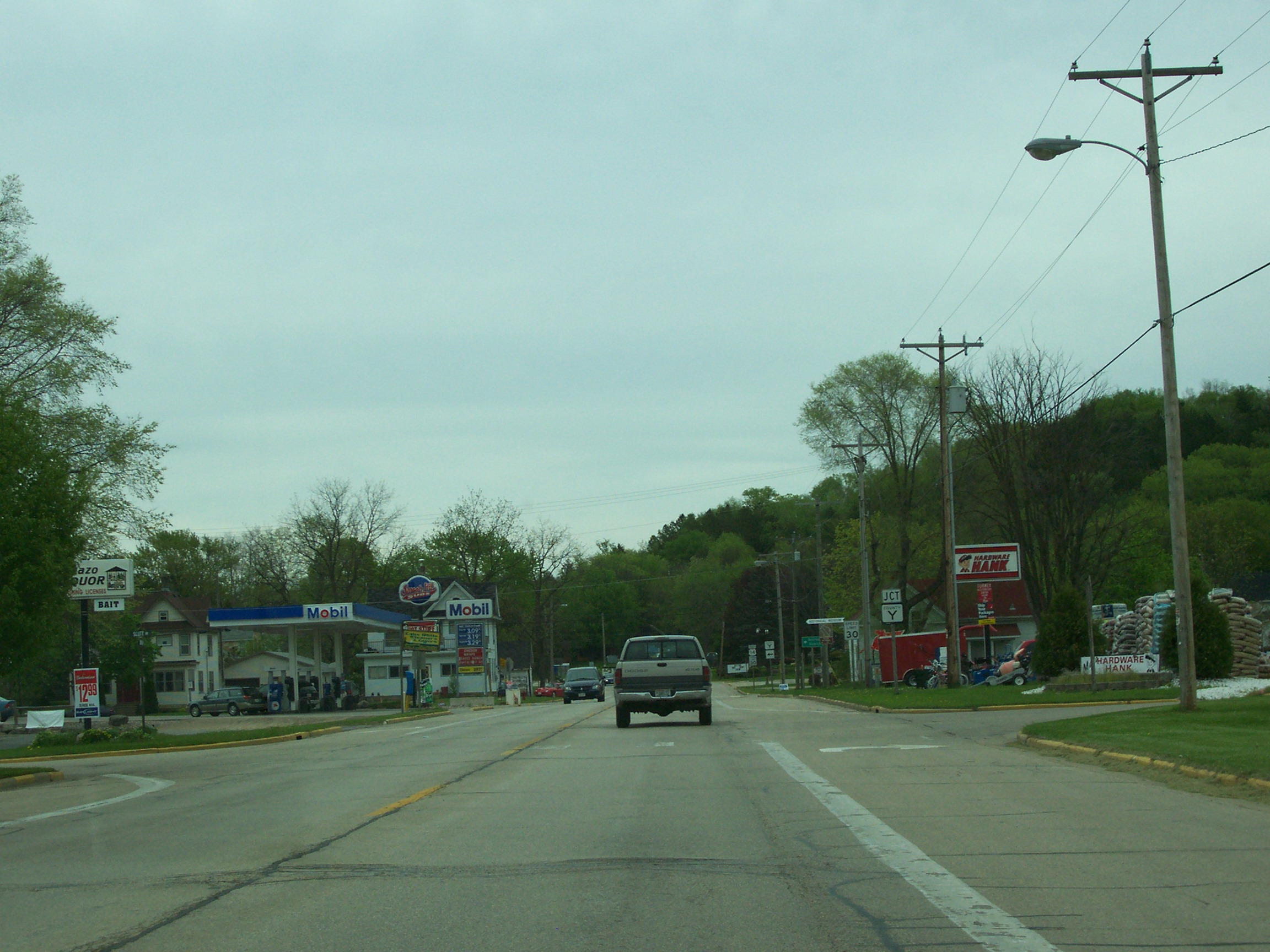
Looking east at Mazomanie

Mazomanie /ˌmeɪzoʊˈmeɪni/ is a village in Dane County, Wisconsin, United States. The population was 1,768 at the 2020 census. The village is located within the Town of Mazomanie. It is part of the Madison, Wisconsin metropolitan area.

== Geography ==
Mazomanie is located at 43°10′28″N 89°47′41″W.

According to the United States Census Bureau, the village has a total area of 1.86 square miles (4.82 km^{2}), of which 1.83 square miles (4.74 km^{2}) is land and 0.03 square miles (0.08 km^{2}) is water.

== Etymology ==
The land on which rests the town of Mazomanie fell within the hunting grounds of the Hočąk, or Winnebago, Indian nation. About a decade after the Winnebago cession of 1832, there were only a small number of white settlers in the area. The village received its name; many years later, Edward Brodhead explained its derivation: "He (Mazomanie) was an Indian chief in our state and was well known to the old gentleman, H.L. Dousman, who said the Indians pronounced it as though it was spelled Man-zo-ma-nie and the English of it is Iron Horse, which I adopted for the name of a railroad town and also for the name of my horse." This distinguished chief was Mą́zamąnį́ga, "Iron Walker."

The Hočągara, who have persisted in the area despite many attempts to eject them, call this town Mą́zamąnį́, dropping the suffix -ga (a definite article used to indicate a person's name). The first syllable of this name is pronounced, as Brodhead indicated, ('man') since the /ą/ is nasalized. The first element of the name is mąs, "iron, metal, ax," which before a consonant may be softened to mąza- or mąze-, although the free standing form mąz is also known. This is seen in the variant forms mązara, mązera, "the ax." In like fashion, in the same sources, we find the names Mązawįga or Mązewįga, "Iron Woman." This accounts for the variant name of the chief recorded by Col. John Kinsey as Mau-zay-mau-nee-kaw [Mązemąnįka]. The second part of the name is formed by the word mąnį́, which means "to walk, he walks" — thus "Iron Walker."

The double meaning of this name has long been appreciated: “The proprietors [of the railroad] have christened it Mazo-Manie, The-Iron-that-Walks, after a somewhat noted Indian chief; and as it is the offspring of an iron way, the name is not inappropriate.” The actual village of Iron Walker was located near Watertown, about 45 miles to the east. Dodsworth, however, adduces considerations that greatly complicate the eponymy of the present day Mazomanie. The town for some time was known as "Mazo Manie," and recalls in its spelling the name of a pair of Wahpeton Dakota chiefs of that era named Maz-zo-ma-nee. The Dakota (Sioux) language is akin to Winnebago, and it may be immediately appreciated that these names are exactly cognate to one another. Both of the Dakota chiefs were known to H.L. Dousman, the aforementioned source of Brodhead's information about the Indian names. He also knew the Hočąk chief, having been caught up in the incident that led to that chief's notoriety.

It transpired that in October 1836, Iron Walker had shot dead the well-known interpreter Pierre Poquette in an affair of honor. He was initially convicted of murder, but in a second trial was acquitted. Dousman acted as guardian of Poquette's orphaned children and petitioned to secure for them a pension. Dodsworth concludes that the town was intended to have been named for the Dakota chief. However, the proper rendering of the Dakota name is Máza-máni, lacking the nasalized letter to which Brodhead referred. Furthermore, neither of them was "an Indian chief in our state [Wisconsin]," but were from Minnesota. The real attraction of the spelling and pronunciation now in effect is made clear in a newspaper article of the time: “We are daily asked how to pronounce this beautiful looking name. We have heard various ways, but none that sounded so naturally and well as by accenting the second syllable, thus Ma-zom-anie, the accent as in Menominee. That makes a very pretty thing of it. It is the station on the Mil. & Mis. R. R. 22 miles west of here.” The /o/ in the name is a pure artifact of introducing the Indian name into English, and is found in neither Dakota nor Winnebago. The present rendering of the town's name owes to euphony and spelling conventions, none of which invalidates Brodhead's attribution of the name to the gunslinging chief of the Hočągara.

== History ==
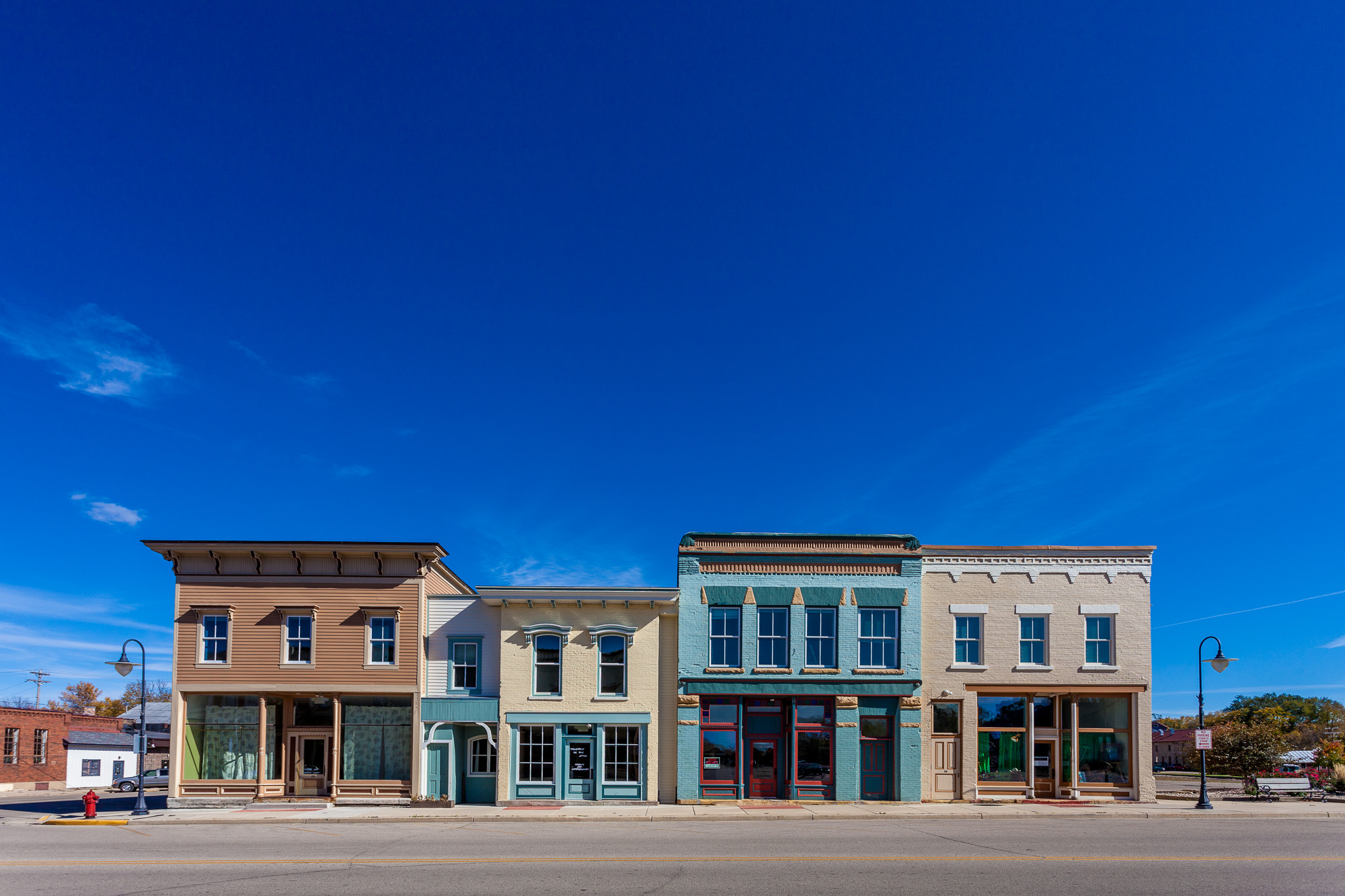
Row of historic buildings along Brodhead Street, Mazomanie.

What precipitated the birth of the town was the advent of the Milwaukee and Mississippi Railroad in 1855, which passed through the region to connect Milwaukee with La Crosse. The superintendent of the railroad was Edward Brodhead.

By the nation's centennial, Mazomanie had grown to 1,100 people, making it the second largest community in Dane County. Since that time, the village has gained only 350 people, but its small size and slow growth has preserved its nineteenth century character. The village has thirty-four commercial buildings on the National Register of Historic Places, the best known among these being the Mazomanie Railroad Depot which has, with minor changes, remained as it was when it was built in 1857.

== Demographics ==
Historical population
Census	Pop.	Note	%±
1860	604		—
1870	1,143		89.2%
1890	1,034		—
1900	902		−12.8%
1910	917		1.7%
1920	756		−17.6%
1930	747		−1.2%
1940	851		13.9%
1950	962		13.0%
1960	1,069		11.1%
1970	1,217		13.8%
1980	1,248		2.5%
1990	1,377		10.3%
2000	1,485		7.8%
2010	1,652		11.2%
2020	1,768		7.0%
U.S. Decennial Census

=== 2010 census ===
As of the census of 2010, there were 1,652 people, 689 households, and 463 families residing in the village. The population density was 902.7 inhabitants per square mile (348.5/km^{2}). There were 734 housing units at an average density of 401.1 per square mile (154.9/km^{2}). The racial makeup of the village was 94.6% White, 1.7% African American, 0.2% Native American, 1.2% Asian, 1.5% from other races, and 0.8% from two or more races. Hispanic or Latino of any race were 2.4% of the population.

There were 689 households, of which 32.2% had children under the age of 18 living with them, 51.4% were married couples living together, 11.3% had a female householder with no husband present, 4.5% had a male householder with no wife present, and 32.8% were non-families. 25.8% of all households were made up of individuals, and 9.6% had someone living alone who was 65 years of age or older. The average household size was 2.40 and the average family size was 2.90.

The median age in the village was 37.3 years. 25.2% of residents were under the age of 18; 8% were between the ages of 18 and 24; 28.8% were from 25 to 44; 26.4% were from 45 to 64; and 11.7% were 65 years of age or older. The gender makeup of the village was 49.8% male and 50.2% female.

=== 2000 census ===
As of the census of 2000, there were 1,485 people, 594 households, and 427 families residing in the village. The population density was 1,088.6 people per square mile (421.6/km^{2}). There were 618 housing units at an average density of 453.0 per square mile (175.4/km^{2}). The racial makeup of the village was 96.36% White, 0.88% Black or African American, 0.47% Native American, 0.07% Asian, 1.14% from other races, and 1.08% from two or more races. 1.95% of the population were Hispanic or Latino of any race.

There were 594 households, out of which 35.5% had children under the age of 18 living with them, 56.1% were married couples living together, 11.1% had a female householder with no husband present, and 28.1% were non-families. 23.6% of all households were made up of individuals, and 9.1% had someone living alone who was 65 years of age or older. The average household size was 2.50 and the average family size was 2.94.

In the village, the population was spread out, with 27.3% under the age of 18, 6.6% from 18 to 24, 32.4% from 25 to 44, 22.4% from 45 to 64, and 11.3% who were 65 years of age or older. The median age was 36 years. For every 100 females, there were 103.7 males. For every 100 females age 18 and over, there were 95.7 males.

The median income for a household in the village was $49,191, and the median income for a family was $56,442. Males had a median income of $35,156 versus $28,424 for females. The per capita income for the village was $21,634. About 2.5% of families and 6.1% of the population were below the poverty line, including 12.5% of those under age 18 and 7.6% of those age 65 or over.

== Education ==
Mazomanie has one elementary school: Mazomanie Elementary School, with about 200 students. The high school and middle school are located in a single building, the Wisconsin Heights High School, which enrolls about 380 students. The middle school and high school serves students from Mazomanie, Black Earth and other communities in the area.

== Awards ==
- Voted one of "America's Coolest Small Towns" by Budget Travel magazine in 2008.

== Notable natives and residents ==
- Marissa Bode, actress known for playing Nessarose in the two-part film adaptation of Wicked
- James R. Brandon, a professor of the performing arts in Asia, while specializing in Japanese Kabuki and Indian classical drama at the University of Hawaiʻi
- Esther Coopersmith, American diplomat, philanthropist, political lobbyist, and UNESCO Goodwill Ambassador
- Skylar Grey (formerly known as Holly Brook), singer, songwriter, musician, and record producer
- Lorenzo D. Harvey, Superintendent of Public Instruction of Wisconsin
- Henry Powell, Wisconsin State Representative
- Robert Joseph Wells, Minnesota State Representative
- Leonard G. Wolf, United States House of Representatives from Iowa
