= Lim Hyung-joo =

South Korean opera singer (born 1986)

Lim Hyung-joo FRSA
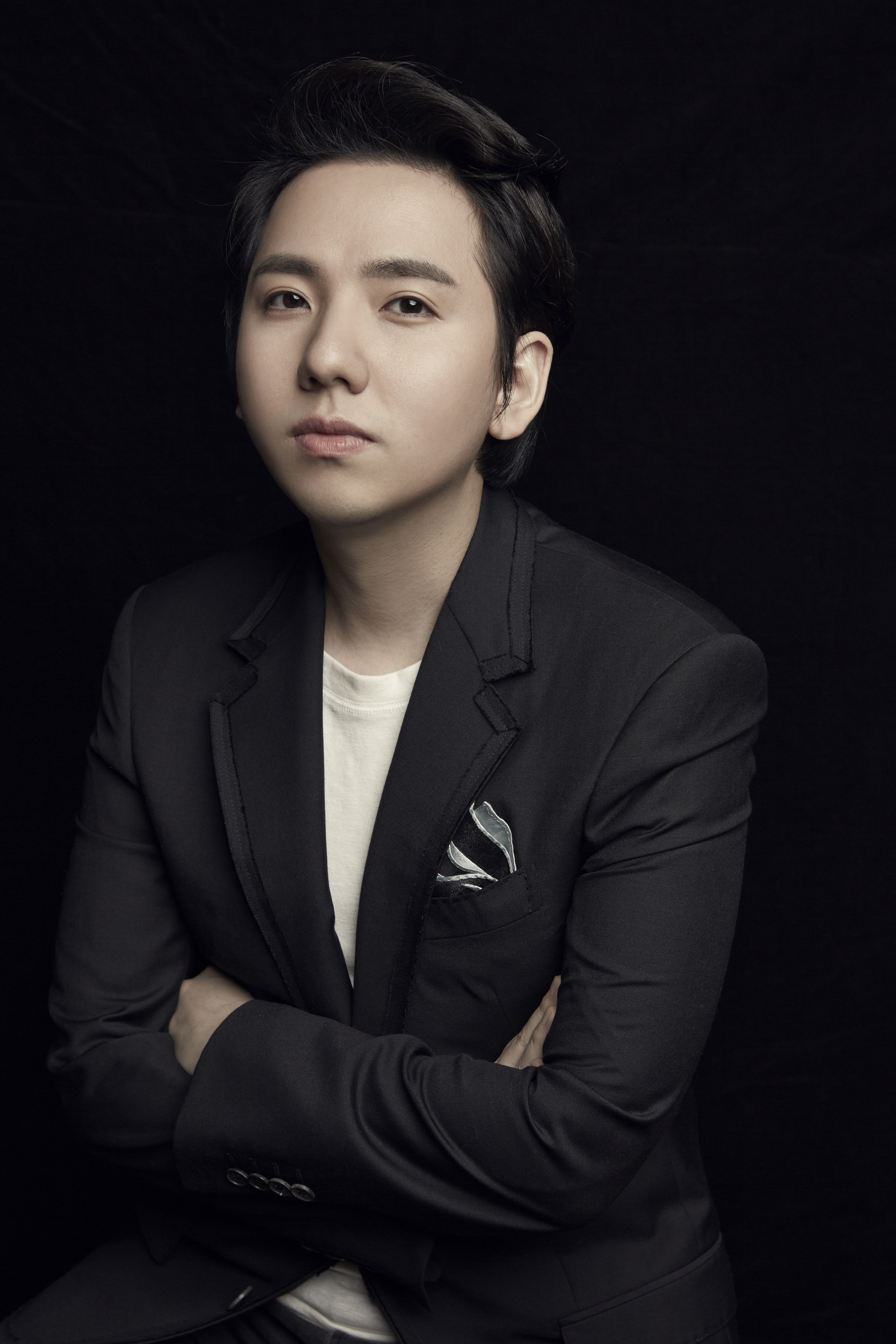

Background information
- Born: 7 May 1986 (age 40)
- Origin: Seoul, South Korea
- Genres: Classical crossover, Operatic pop
- Occupation: Singer
- Years active: 1998–present
- Labels: Samsung Music, Synnara Music, Sony Music Entertainment, EMI Music, Warner Music Group, Universal Music Group (2014–present)
- Website: www.hyungjoo.com

- Lim Hyung-joo
- Hangul: 임형주
- Hanja: 林亨柱
- RR: Im Hyeongju
- MR: Im Hyŏngju

Lim Hyung-joo (Korean: 임형주; born 7 May 1986) is a South Korean operatic pop and classical crossover singer. He has sold more than 1.2 million records worldwide, including over 1 million in South Korea, and his total digital songs, singles and albums (including digital downloads, streaming and ringtone service) sold more than 10 million units.

== Life and career ==
Lim Hyung-joo released his first solo album at the age of 12 in 1998. He made his debut as a popera singer at the age of 17 years in 2003. On 25 February that year, at the inauguration day of the 16th president of Republic of Korea, he was the youngest person to sing the national anthem of Korea. His performance had been aired abroad. In addition, Lim Hyung-joo had a first solo concert abroad in June 2003, at the New York's Carnegie Hall. He was the youngest Korean male vocalist to give a solo concert in that venue. The performance was very highly received.

Lim performed with the world's major venues and orchestras. He gave performances in New York's Carnegie Hall, Alice Tully Hall at the Lincoln Center, and Hollywood Bowl, Walt Disney Concert Hall & Orpheum Theatrein Los Angeles, Main Hall of Knafel Center at Harvard University in Boston, St John's Smith Square in London and Wiener Konzerthaus, Paris' Salle Gaveau, and The Cathedral of Saint-Louis des Invalides and La Madeleine in Paris, Teatro di Marcello in Rome, Universal Hall in Berlin, AmsterdamRoyal Concertgebouw, Marble Hall of Mirabell Palace in Salzburg, Studio of Radio and television broadcasting in the Czech Republic, Tokyo Suntory Hall & Tokyo International Forum Main Hall(Hall A), Izumi Hall in Osaka, Main Auditorium of China Public Diplomacy & Culture Exchange Center in Beijing, Westin Shanghai, Sun Yat-sen Memorial Hall in Taipei and others. He performed with Berliner Symphoniker, Berlin Sinfonie Orchester, Wiener Sinfonie Orchester, Czech Symphony Orchestra, Moscow Symphony Orchestra, Tokyo Philharmonic Orchestra, New York Metropolitan Opera Chamber Orchestra, Los Angeles Symphony Orchestra, New Jersey Philharmonic Orchestra, Bavarian Chamber Orchestra, Salzburger Solisten, Vienna Soloists Ensemble, Vienna Mozart Ensemble Orchestra, American Union Chamber Orchestra, Seoul Philharmonic Orchestra, KBS Symphony Orchestra, Korean Symphony Orchestra, Eurasian Philharmonic Orchestra, Seoul Pops Orchestra, Prime Philharmonic Orchestra and numerous groups in Taiwan and Japan. Furthermore, he is the first Korean artist who conquered all three halls at Carnegie Hall, and the fourth youngest man ever to give a solo concert at the Opera Theater in the Seoul Arts Center. By the age of 27, he had performed at the TOP 3 classical concert halls of Korea (Concert Hall & Opera Theater of the Seoul Arts Center, Main Auditorium of the Sejong Center in Seoul, Main Hall 'Hae' of the National Theater of Korea).

=== Education ===
- Shinyongsan Elementary School in Seoul (graduation)
- Yewon Arts School in Seoul (graduation 'vocal')
- Juilliard School of Music Pre-College in New York City, vocal judges unanimously passed
- Accademia San Felice di Musica in Florence (diploma 'operatic voice')
- Franz Schubert Konservatorium in Vienna, Invited student ('operatic voice'-Master of Music)
- Civica Scuola delle Arti di Roma (Rome) (graduation 'operatic voice'-Artist Diploma)

== Community outreach ==
Lim was a spokesperson for the Seoul National University Hospital & LG Household & Health Care "beautiful face campaign", the Ministry of Culture, Sports and Tourism and the Korea Tourism Organization "Korea In Motion" campaign, the 2009 Seoul Chungmuro International Film Festival, the Seoul CO_{2} honor Dr. PR committee, the Jung-gu district of Seoul, the Seoul St. Mary's Hospital of Catholic University, and of the 2011 Daegu IAAF World Championships. As of 2014, he is a spokesperson for the Korean Red Cross, the Community Chest of Korea 'Fruit of Love' campaign, the International Relief and Development World Vision, the Korea Association YWCA, the Green Growth National Union, the UNESCO Korean National Commission's first goodwill ambassador for peace and arts, the Promotional ambassador for 2015 Gwangju Summer Universiade, and He is the Art-one Cultural Foundation founder.

Art-one was established by Lim in January 2008 to celebrate the anniversary of his 5th world and 10th domestic debuts. He wanted to help disadvantaged, talented people by donating his proceeds.

In December 2010, Lim was awarded the United Nations Peace Medal for donating proceeds from a concert commemorating the 60th anniversary of the Korean War to descendants of veterans, becoming the first and youngest Korean to receive the award.

== Other activities ==
Lim was the youngest editor of the magazine Weekly Kyunghyang, and he is an interviewer for the US magazine Forbes (Korean Edition). He was the youngest columnist from 2010 to 2015 in The Dong-A Ilbo. In addition, Lim published his first essay, "Only One", with his mother in March 2005, and the book was ranked the top bestseller in Youngpoong bookstore.

== Awards ==
In 2000

- CBS 1st National Music Competition 1st prize

In 2001–2002

- The 5th Korean National Youth Music Competition 1st prize
- The 12th 'Journal of Music' National Student Music Competition 1st prize
- Yewon concert the first vocal soloist (Venue: Concert Hall, Seoul Arts Center)
- Casual Classic International Scholarship Vocal Music Competition Championships and Scholarship Selection
- Yewon arts school top Vocal Practical Skill and Achievement Award

In 2003

- American USO Association honors contributions Merit Award (the youngest Korean winner)

In 2004

- US Cotton Club International (CCI) chosen artist and the main model in that year in Asia (Korean first and youngest selected musician)

In 2005

- Sony BMG headquarters Golden Disk Award
- Korea Educational Development Institute survey, selected him along with Roh Moo Hyun, Lee Kun Hee and Ahn Cheol-soo as the most famous Korean people high school students want to see.
- Netizen selected him among "30 beautiful people, representing the Republic of Korea, from art and academic sector."
- Japan's NHK "Kōhaku Uta Gassen" trophy (the first and youngest Korean classical musician)

In 2007

- Yewon arts school 'Alumni Achievement Award'

In 2009

- Korea Tourism Organization selected him for "Korea 100 representative figures"

In 2010

- UN Peace medal 'United Nations Peace Medal'

In 2011

- The first and youngest recipient of 'the Month of Donators' Health and Welfare Minister Award
- the youngest ever winner of the Korea Association of Newspapers Star Award

In 2012

- Interpark investigation netizens selected him for "2012 Best Music / DVD Classic Division 1, 2 and 3 above"

In 2013

- Interpark investigation netizens selected him for "2013 Best Music / DVD Classic sector" and "Artist of the Year 2013 Classic 1st Division"

In 2014

- United States House of California Representatives Received citation

In 2015

- U.S. Presidential Culture Award
- 'The 3 Popera tenors in the world' by CNNiReport
- BBC Music Magazine Publishes List of 'The TOP 5 most influential popera singers in the world'

In 2016

- '30 under 30 Asia' by Forbes Asia edition

In 2017

- Voting member of the Grammys (Recording Academy)

== Discography ==
Studio albums

- The 1st album in January 2003 – Salley Garden
- The 2nd album in September 2003 – Silver Rain
- The 3rd album March 2004 – Misty Moon
- The 4th album in October 2005 – The Lotus
- The 5th album in December 2013 – Finally
- The 5.5th album in February 2015 – Sarang : Love
- The 6th album in November 2016 – The Last Confession
- The 7th album in November 2021 – Lost In Time
- The 8th album in November 2022 – Lost In Memory
- The 9th album in November 2023 – Life On Air

Other studio albums (Special, Live, EP, Classical etc.)

- 1998 – Whispers of Hope
- 2005 – Live From Seoul (Live Album)
- 2006 – White Dream
- 2007 – Eternal Memory
- 2009 – My Hero
- 2010 – Miracle History
- 2011 – Once More
- 2012 – Oriental Love
- 2013 – Classic Style
- 2013 – All My History

Singles

- 2006 – "Acacia"
- 2009 – "Crystal Tears"
- 2011 – "Beautiful Wish"
- 2012 – "Eastern Shadow"
- 2014 – "A Thousand Winds"
- 2015 – "Always There"(featuring Secret Garden)
- 2017 - "Around Thirty"
- 2019 - "A New Road"
- 2020 - "A Song For You"
