= John Welles =

John Welles may refer to:

- John Welles (died 1418), MP for Maldon
- John Welles (Southwark MP), MP 1413–1431 for Southwark
- John Welles (fl.1417-1433), MP for the City of London
- John Welles, 1st Viscount Welles (c. 1450–1498), English Lancastrian nobleman
- John Welles (MP for Windsor) (by 1485 – 1515/18), English politician

== See also ==
- John Wells (disambiguation)
