= Thomas Welles (disambiguation) =

Thomas Welles was an American politician in 17th-century Connecticut.

Thomas Welles may also refer to:

- Thomas Welles (MP) for Newcastle-under-Lyme (UK Parliament constituency)
- Tom Welles, character in 8mm (film)

== See also ==
- Thomas Wells (disambiguation)
