= David Wells (disambiguation) =

David Wells (born 1963) is an American former baseball pitcher.

David Wells may also refer to:

- David Ames Wells (1828–1898), American economist
- David F. Wells (born 1939), professor of theology, Congregational minister, author
- David H. Wells, photographer and video maker
- David Wells (admiral) (1918–1983), Australian Deputy Chief of Naval Staff (1970–1971)
- David Wells (American football) (born 1995), player in the National Football League
- David Wells (medium) (born 1960), British astrologer and purported medium
- David Wells (politician) (born 1962), Canadian senator from Newfoundland and Labrador
- Dino Wells (David R. Wells Jr., born 1970), American actor

== See also ==
- David Wallace-Wells, climate change journalist
