= Joseph Wells =

Joseph Wells may refer to:

- Joseph C. Wells (1814–1860), American architect
- Joseph Wells (cricketer) (1828–1910), English cricketer, father of author H. G. Wells
- Robert Joseph Wells (1856–1941), Minnesota politician
- Joseph Wells (academic) (1855–1929), British author and Oxford academic
- Joseph Algernon Wells (1885–1946), British track and field athlete
- Joey Wells (born 1965), long jumper from the Bahamas
- Joseph T. Wells, former American fraud examiner, founder of the Association of Certified Fraud Examiners
- Joseph Wells (politician) Lieutenant Governor of Illinois (1846-1849)
- Joseph Morrill Wells (1853–1890), American architect

== See also ==
- Joseph's Well, identified with the pit in Galilee into which the Biblical figure Joseph was cast by his brothers
- Josephs Well, a music venue in Leeds, England
