= Charles Wells House =

Historic house in Massachusetts, United States

- U.S. National Register of Historic Places
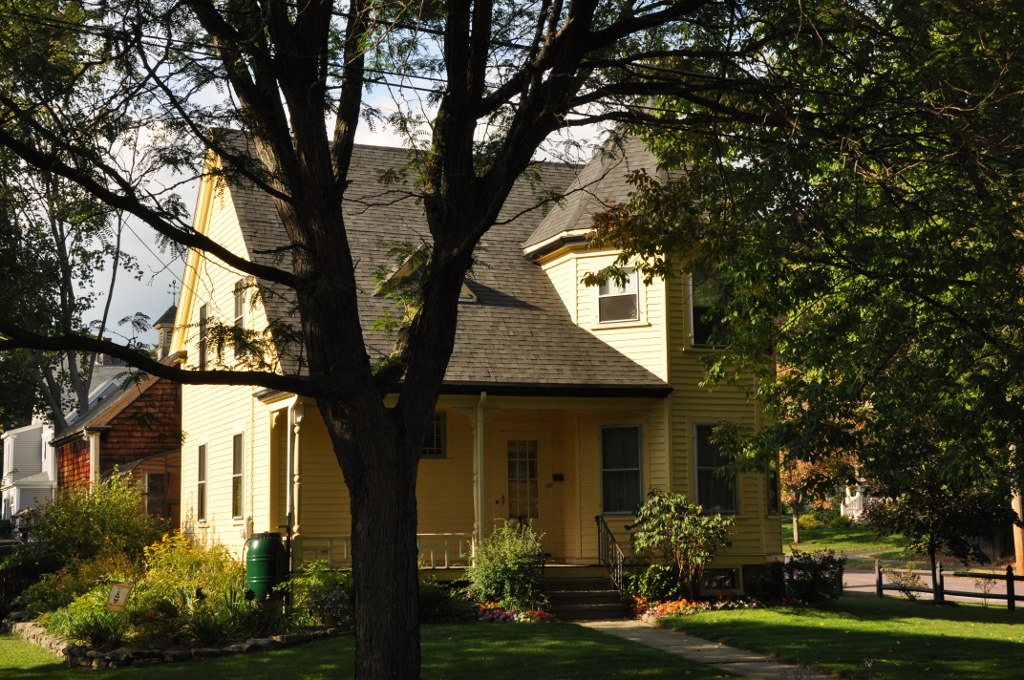

- Location within Massachusetts Location within the United States
- Location: 99 Prescott Street, Reading, Massachusetts
- Coordinates: 42°31′9″N 71°6′51″W
- Built: 1894
- Architectural style: Queen Anne
- MPS: Reading MRA
- NRHP reference No.: 84002842
- Added to NRHP: July 19, 1984

The Charles Wells House is a historic house in Reading, Massachusetts. The two-story Queen Anne Victorian wood-frame house was built in 1894 by Charles Wells, a New Brunswick blacksmith who married a Reading woman. The house is clad in clapboards and has a gable roof, and features a turret with an ornamented copper finial and a front porch supported by turned posts, with a turned balustrade between. A small triangular dormer gives visual interest to the roof above the porch. The house is locally distinctive as a surviving example of a modest Queen Anne house, complete with a period carriage house/barn.

The house was listed on the National Register of Historic Places in 1984.

== See also ==
- National Register of Historic Places listings in Reading, Massachusetts
- National Register of Historic Places listings in Middlesex County, Massachusetts
