= Jason Wells =

Jason Wells may refer to:

- Jason Wells (cricketer) (born 1970), former New Zealand cricketer
- Jason Wells (playwright) (born 1960), American actor and playwright
- Jason Wells (rugby league) (born 1984), Australian rugby league player
