= Esther Coopersmith =

American diplomat (1930–2024)

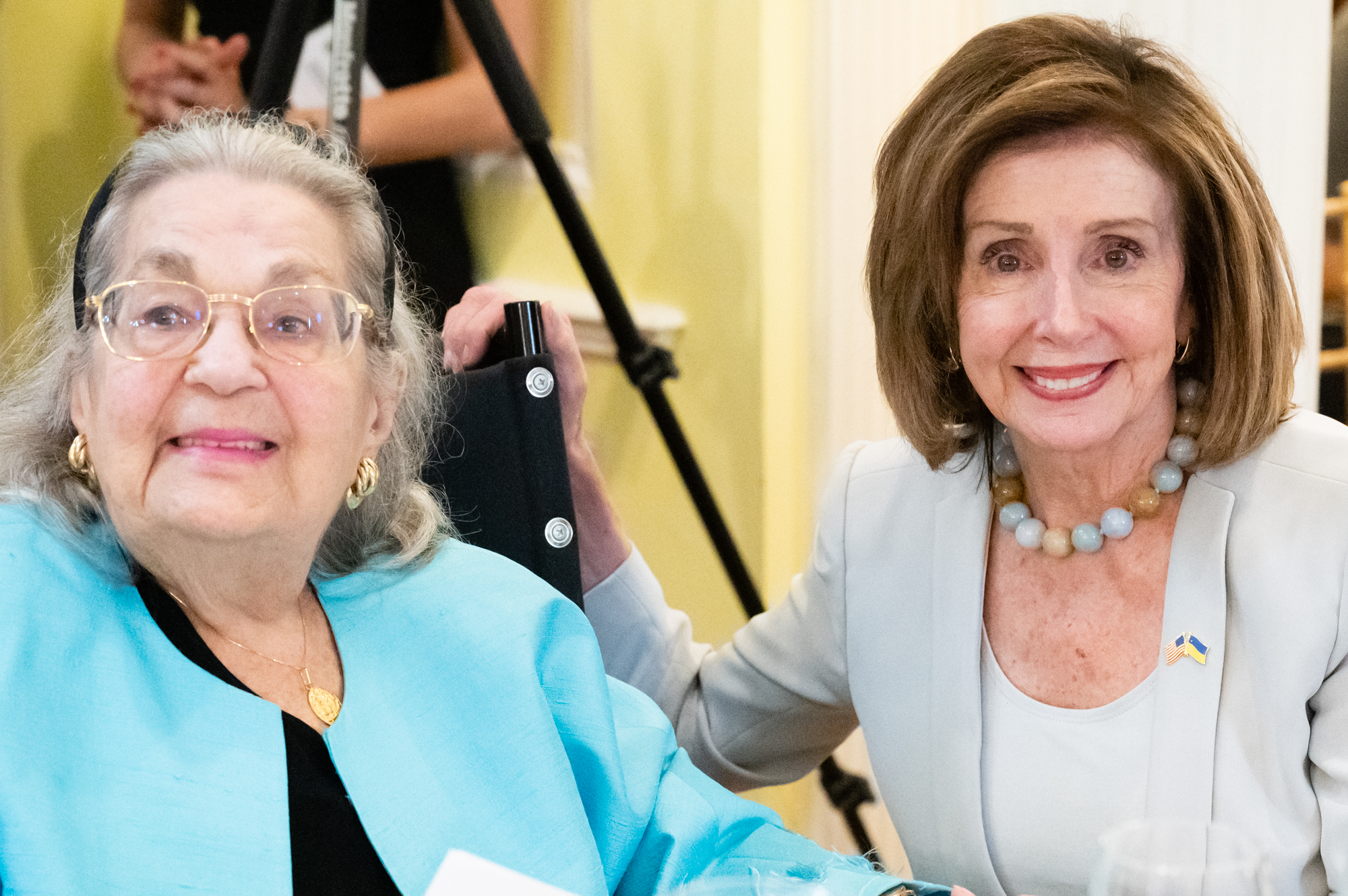
- Coopersmith (left) with Nancy Pelosi in 2023
- Born: Esther Lipsen; January 18, 1930; Des Moines, Iowa, U.S.
- Died: March 26, 2024 (aged 94); Washington, D.C., U.S.
- Occupations: Diplomat; political lobbyist
- Years active: 1952–2023
- Title: UNESCO Goodwill Ambassador (since 2009)
- Spouse: Jack Coopersmith (m. 1954; died 1991)
- Children: 4

Esther Lipsen Coopersmith (January 18, 1930 – March 26, 2024) was an American diplomat, philanthropist, political lobbyist, and a champion for women's equality. For over 70 years, she organized gatherings, from small dinners to grand formal ones, across the world. Her guest list varied from politicians and visiting royals to academics and actors. In 2009, UNESCO named her a goodwill ambassador for "fostering intercultural dialogue".

== Early years ==
Esther Lipsen was born on January 18, 1930, in Des Moines, Iowa; her father was an emigrant cattle dealer from present-day Moldova and her mother was a homemaker from Romania. They moved to Mazomanie, Wisconsin, and Lipsen became interested in politics at age 8, after listening to President Franklin D. Roosevelt's fireside chats on the radio. After graduating from high school, she studied at the University of Denver and later at the University of Wisconsin, where she joined the Young Democrats of America. She became actively involved in politics in 1952, when she filled in to chair an event for the presidential Democratic hopeful, Tennessee senator Estes Kefauver, who went on to win the Wisconsin primary election and 11 of the 15 others across the country, even defeating sitting President Harry S. Truman, who then withdrew his re-election campaign. Kefauver asked Lipsen to open and manage a campaign office for the Chicago convention. Not having any experience with such a job, she asked a rival politician's aides for advice. Despite Kefauver's popularity and campaign success, he lost the Democratic nomination to Illinois governor Adlai Stevenson II. Lipsen then organized Young Democrat campaign clubs to support Stevenson. Although Kefauver invited her to Washington, D.C., in 1954, he did not hire her, despite his desire to run in future presidential elections.

== Wife, diplomat, and ambassador ==
While in Washington, D.C., Lipsen met real estate developer Jack Coopersmith. They married in 1954 and had four children within 8 years. In 1964, Jack remained in Washington, while Esther traveled the country for President Lyndon B. Johnson's family, hosting barbecues for his two daughters. She also served as one of Johnson's White House staff.

Coopersmith’s home became a well known gathering place for the elite of the Democratic Party. At her home she hosted every US president from Harry Truman to Joe Biden (excepting Donald Trump).

In 1972, she supported Joe Biden when he ran in the United States Senate election. She even hosted a fundraiser for him at her home in 2023. During the 1978 Camp David Accords with President Jimmy Carter, Israeli Prime Minister Menachem Begin and Egyptian President Anwar Sadat, Coopersmith hosted a party for the news media. One year later, Carter appointed her as a representative of the U.S. for the United Nations (UN), her first paying job since the 1950s. In 1984, the UN awarded her its Peace Medal, making her only the second woman at the time to receive the honor. In 1991, she accompanied then-governor Bill Clinton to Moscow to improve his knowledge of foreign policy for his plans to run for the U.S. presidency.

In 2009, UNESCO named Coopersmith a Goodwill Ambassador "in light of her outstanding contribution to strengthening mutual understanding between peoples and her unfailing commitment to fostering intercultural dialogue."

== Personal life ==
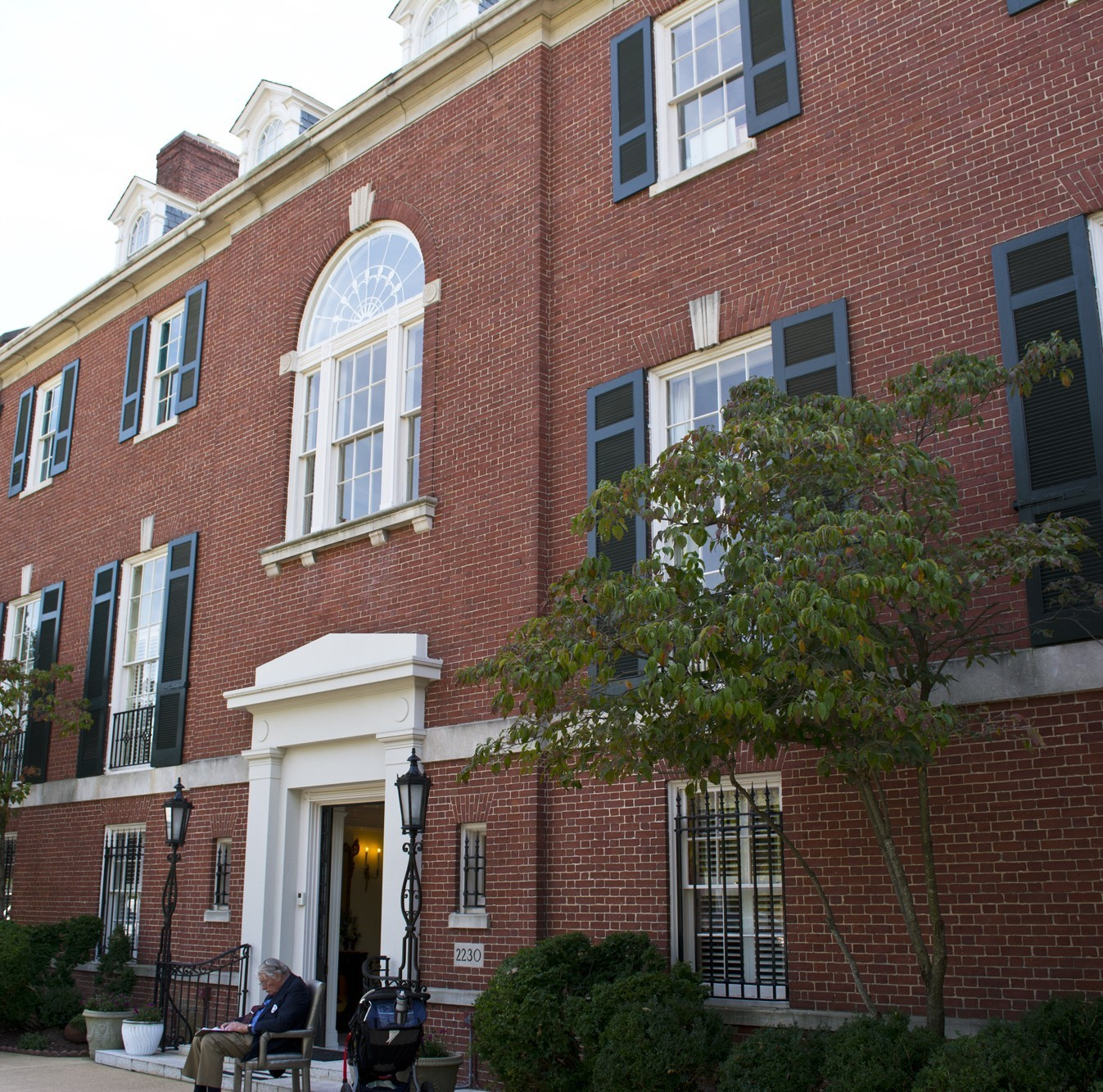
Coopersmith's home in Kalorama Heights, Washington, D.C.

Following her husband Jack's death in 1991, Coopersmith sold their home in Potomac, Maryland, and bought and renovated a house in Kalorama Heights in D.C. She rarely ventured from it, however that didn't affect her desire to be diplomatic. She turned it into a museum of sorts, displaying all the memorabilia she collected over the years, and hosted dignitaries for between 50 and 75 events in it. Her last trip abroad was in 2023 to celebrate the U.S. re-entering UNESCO.

Coopersmith died from cancer at her home on March 26, 2024, at age 94.
