= Tom Wells (footballer) =

Australian rules footballer

Personal information
- Full name: Thomas Albert Wells
- Born: 27 December 1883; Carlton North, Victoria
- Died: 16 January 1959 (aged 75); St Kilda, Victoria
- Original team: Fitzroy juniors
- Height: 182 cm (6 ft 0 in)
- Weight: 80 kg (176 lb)

Playing career^{1}
Years	Club	Games (Goals)
1912	Fitzroy	5 (1)
- ^{1} Playing statistics correct to the end of 1912.

Thomas Albert Wells (27 December 1883 – 16 January 1959) was an Australian rules footballer who played with Fitzroy in the Victorian Football League (VFL).
