= James D. Wells (physicist) =

James Daniel Wells
- Education: Michigan (Ph.D.); Brigham Young University
- Awards: Humboldt Research Award (2016); Sloan Research Fellow (2000–2004)
- Scientific career
- Fields: Physics
- Workplaces: Michigan (2002–); CERN; UC–Davis; SLAC at Stanford (1995–1998)
- Thesis: Phenomenology of constrained supersymmetry (1995)
- Doctoral advisor: Gordon L. Kane

James Daniel Wells is an American physicist and a professor of Physics at the University of Michigan.

Wells earned his bachelor's and master's degrees at Brigham Young University, followed by his doctorate at the University of Michigan. After working at SLAC National Accelerator Laboratory and CERN, Wells began his teaching career in 1999 at the University of California, Davis. He returned to Michigan as a faculty member in 2002. In 2013, Wells was elected a fellow of the American Physical Society, which acknowledged him "[f]or his many fundamental contributions to theories of new physics beyond the Standard Model, including the role of electroweak symmetry breaking, Higgs boson physics, and collider searches for supersymmetry and extra dimensions." The American Association for the Advancement of Science granted Wells an equivalent honor in 2019.
