= Henry Wells (disambiguation) =

Henry Wells (1805–1878) was an American businessman and co-founder of American Express and Wells Fargo.

Henry Wells may also refer to:

- Henry Wells (professor) (c. 17th century), English theologian and 10th Gresham Professor of Divinity
- Henry H. Wells (1823–1900), governor of Virginia
- Henry Gordon Wells (1879–1954), American lawyer and Massachusetts and New Hampshire politician
- Henry Wells (rowing) (1891–1967), English judge and rowing coxswain
- Henry Wells (general) (1898–1973), chief of the Australian general staff
- Henry Wells (author) (1914–2007), American author, professor, and expert on Latin America politics
- Henry Jackson Wells (1823–1912), American politician in Massachusetts
- Henry Tanworth Wells (1828–1903), English miniature and portrait painter
- Henry Wells (musician) (1906–?), American jazz musician
- Henry Wells (Master of Trinity Hall, Cambridge) (died 1429), English academic
- Henry Lake Wells (1850–1898), British Army officer and civil servant
- Henry S. Wells (1842–1864), American Civil War soldier and Medal of Honor recipient

== See also ==
- Harry Wells (disambiguation)
- Henry Welles (disambiguation)
- Henry Wells Tracy (1807–1886), member of the U.S. House of Representatives
- Clark Henry Wells (1822–1888), U.S. Navy rear admiral
