= George H. Wells =

New-York native, Confederate Army officer and later Democratic in Louisiana State Senate

Member of the Louisiana Senate from the Lake Charles, Louisiana district

Personal details
- Born: September 1, 1833 Schenectady, New York, U.S.
- Died: February 1, 1905 (aged 71) Lake Charles, Louisiana, U.S.

George H. Wells (September 1, 1833 – February 1, 1905) was a New-York native who became a Confederate Army officer and later served as a Democratic member of the Louisiana State Senate representing Lake Charles, Louisiana.
