= Colin Wells (cricketer) =

English cricketer (born 1960)

Personal information
- Full name: Colin Mark Wells
- Born: 3 March 1960 (age 66); Newhaven, Sussex, England
- Batting: Right-handed
- Bowling: Right-arm medium
- Role: All-rounder
- Relatives: Alan Wells (brother); Daniel Wells (nephew); Luke Wells (nephew)

International information
- National side: England (1985)
- ODI debut (cap 82): 24 March 1985 v Australia
- Last ODI: 26 March 1985 v Pakistan

Domestic team information
- Years: Team
- 1979–1993: Sussex
- 1980/81: Border
- 1984/85: Western Province
- 1994–1996: Derbyshire

Career statistics
Competition	ODI	FC	LA
Matches	2	318	322
Runs scored	22	14,289	6,192
Batting average	11.00	33.07	25.80
100s/50s	0/0	24/67	4/28
Top score	17	203	117
Balls bowled	–	31,257	11,614
Wickets	–	428	233
Bowling average	–	34.45	30.93
5 wickets in innings	–	7	0
10 wickets in match	–	0	–
Best bowling	–	7/42	4/15
Catches/stumpings	0/–	111/–	76/–
- Source: ESPNcricinfo, 22 May 2017

Colin Mark Wells (born 3 March 1960) is a former cricketer. He was a solid county all-rounder, who played for Derbyshire and Sussex, as well as Border and Western Province in South Africa.

He played two One Day Internationals in 1985, without making much of an impact, and was never selected to play for England again.

He is the brother of Alan Wells, who played a single Test and ODI in 1995.

He coached and captained Seaford Cricket Club for the 2006 and 2007 season and was the coach of the United Arab Emirates national side in 2009.
