= Chris Wells =

Chris Wells may refer to:

- Beanie Wells (born 1988), also known as Chris Wells, Arizona Cardinals football player
- Chris Wells (ice hockey) (born 1975), former National Hockey League player
- Chris Wells (politician), British politician, leader of Thanet District Council
- Chris Wells (curler), Welsh curler and coach
- Chris Wells (tennis), British tennis player

Christopher Wells may refer to:

- The Adventures of Christopher Wells, an American radio program (1947–1948)
