= Peter Wells (sailor) =

American windsurfer (born 1974)

Peter Wells (born August 28, 1974) is an American windsurfer who competed at the 2004 Summer Olympics.
