= Alan Wells =

English cricketer

Personal information
- Full name: Alan Peter Wells
- Born: 2 October 1961 (age 65); Newhaven, Sussex, England
- Batting: Right-handed
- Bowling: Right-arm medium
- Role: Middle order batsman
- Relatives: Colin Wells (brother); Daniel Wells (son); Luke Wells (son)

International information
- National side: England (1995)
- Only Test (cap 576): 24 August 1995 v West Indies
- Only ODI (cap 132): 28 May 1995 v West Indies

Domestic team information
- Years: Team
- 1981–1996: Sussex
- 1981/82: Border
- 1997–2000: Kent

Career statistics
Competition	Test	ODI	FC	LA
Matches	1	1	376	377
Runs scored	3	15	21,099	9,381
Batting average	3.00	15.00	38.57	30.75
100s/50s	0/0	0/0	46/101	8/58
Top score	3*	15	253*	127
Balls bowled	–	–	1,171	128
Wickets	–	–	10	7
Bowling average	–	–	82.00	20.28
5 wickets in innings	–	–	0	0
10 wickets in match	–	–	0	0
Best bowling	–	–	3/67	1/0
Catches/stumpings	0/–	0/–	227/–	108/–
- Source: ESPNcricinfo, 22 May 2017

Alan Peter Wells (born 2 October 1961) is an English cricketer. He played for Sussex from 1981 to 1996, where he was captain from 1992 to 1996. He then played for Kent from 1997 to 2000. In total he played 376 first-class matches in a career spanning twenty seasons, with a batting average of 38.57 and a top score of 253 not out (against Yorkshire at Middlesbrough in 1991).

He only played twice for England, once in a Test match (where he was dismissed for a golden duck by the West Indian fast bowler Curtly Ambrose), and once in a One Day International. In 1989–90, Wells joined the rebel tour of South Africa as a replacement when Roland Butcher pulled out.

== Domestic career ==
Wells played most of his career with Sussex, helping them to win the John Player League in 1982 and the 1986 NatWest Trophy. He moved to Kent in 1997, appearing in the final of that year's Benson & Hedges Cup and briefly played with Border in South Africa in 1981–82.

== England A ==
Wells toured South Africa with England A in 1993–94, impressing by making 130 (and 45 not out) in the unofficial 'Test', as well as 126 against Eastern Province.

During the following winter of 1994–95, Wells led England 'A' to a long and highly successful tour of the Indian subcontinent. They convincingly won the three unofficial tests against their Indian counterparts. The three-match One-Day series was much closer, but still England 'A' emerged victorious (2–1). Wells produced his best in the 2nd 'Test' at the Eden Gardens, Calcutta. There, he scored 93 & 65. The Indian leg was followed by a short tour of Bangladesh in mid-February. England 'A' won the two One-Day matches, while the 3-Day match was drawn.

Wells' able leadership was a key factor in the success of the tour, Simon Hughes praising Wells as a "hard, aggressive captain". It was a great learning experience for some of the young England players. Some of them, like, Nick Knight, Michael Vaughan, Dominic Cork, Jason Gallian, went on to play for the main England outfit, others such as tour vice-captain Mark Ramprakash and Ian Salisbury also presently resuming their Test careers.

== International career ==
Hughes however suggested at the end of the India leg of the 1994-5 tour that while Wells "still has aspirations for Test cricket ... these are probably just wishful thinking despite his versatility". Nonetheless, Wells did briefly get a limited chance for international cricket the following summer (1995).

In his only one-day international, an England victory over the West Indies, his innings was limited by the solidity of England's higher order batting, especially captain Michael Atherton who made his first one-day international century, Wisden observing that "Wells, making his England debut at 33, had to walk out for a ten-minute thrash after Atherton finally departed to a standing ovation".

It was a similar story in his only Test match three months later, Christopher Martin-Jenkins observing that on Wells' first day of Test cricket, Ambrose "turned Alan Wells' moment of destiny after his long wait for a Test innings into deepest bathos by dismissing him first ball". Then "on a perfect pitch for batting", Brian Lara, Carl Hooper and others racked up big scores and once again a lengthy innings by Atherton (this time a draw-ensuring rearguard) left Wells almost no opportunity to bat in the second innings, Martin-Jenkins observing that "Atherton`s untimely fall five short of a century allowed Alan Wells to get off the mark in Test cricket, albeit in what was a 'no win' situation". Wells finished three not out as the match ended, his only Test runs.

Wells' brother, Colin Wells, also played for Sussex and England (in two One Day Internationals ten years earlier).

== Later career ==
Alan Wells is now director of cricket at St Bede's School, Hailsham.

Sporting positions
Preceded by Paul Parker	Sussex county cricket captain 1992–1996	Succeeded by Peter Moores
