= Daniel Wells (cricketer) =

English cricketer (born 1995)

Personal information
- Full name: Daniel Alan C Wells
- Born: June 1995 (age 31); Eastbourne, East Sussex, England
- Relatives: Alan Wells (father); Luke Wells (brother); Colin Wells (uncle)

Domestic team information
- Years: Team
- 2017–present: Oxford MCCU
- First-class debut: 28 March 2017 Oxford MCCU v Surrey

Career statistics
Competition	First-class
Matches	2
Runs scored	42
Batting average	10.50
100s/50s	0/0
Top score	33
Catches/stumpings	0/–
- Source: ESPNcricinfo, 22 May 2017

Daniel Alan C Wells (born June 1995) is an English cricketer. He made his first-class debut on 28 March 2017 for Oxford MCCU against Surrey as part of the Marylebone Cricket Club University fixtures.
