= Jennifer Coopersmith =

Physicist and historian of physics

Jennifer Coopersmith (born 1955) is an independent scholar known for her books on physics and the history of physics.

== Life ==
Coopersmith is originally from Cape Town, South Africa, where she was born in 1955. After emigrating to England with her family in 1958, she read physics at King's College London, taking a bachelor's degree and Ph.D. in physics. After postdoctoral research at the University of British Columbia in Canada, and several part-time teaching positions in England and Australia, she moved to France in 2015.

== Books ==
Coopersmith is the author of:

- Energy, the Subtle Concept: The Discovery of Feynman’s Blocks, from Leibniz to Einstein (Oxford University Press, 2010)
- The Lazy Universe: an introduction to the Principle of Least Action (Oxford University Press, 2017)

She is one of the translators and editors of Lazare Carnot's Essay on Machines in General (1786): Texts, Translations and Commentaries (with Raffaele Pisano and Murray Peake, Springer, Logic, Epistemology, and the Unity of Science, vol. 47, 2021).
