= Robert Joseph Wells =

American politician

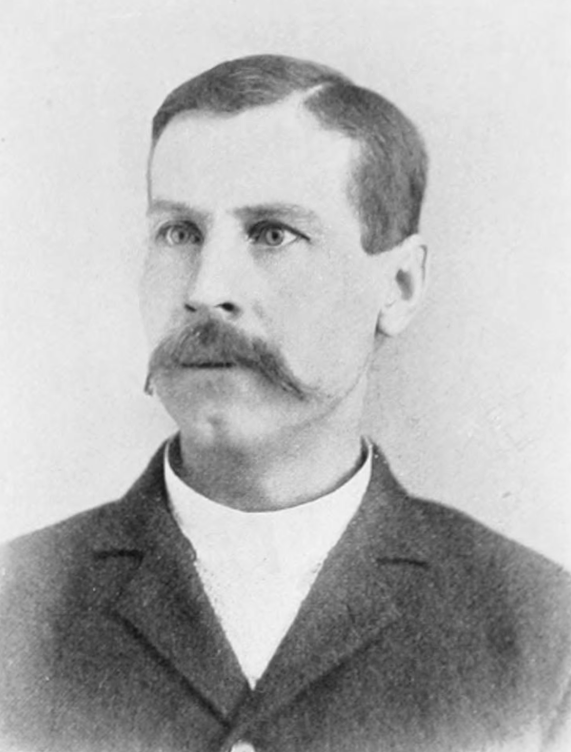

Member of the Minnesota House of Representatives
- In office 1901–1910

Personal details
- Born: October 4, 1856 Mazomanie, Wisconsin
- Died: February 12, 1941 (aged 84) Winter Haven, Florida
- Party: Republican
- Spouse: Sadie E. Langford (m. 1889)
- Children: 4
- Occupation: Farmer, lawyer, politician

Robert Joseph Wells (October 4, 1856 – February 12, 1941) was a member of the Minnesota House of Representatives.

== Life and politics ==
Wells was born in Mazomanie, Wisconsin. He moved to Mitchell Township, Minnesota in May 1878 and began working as a farmer. He studied law in his spare time, and was admitted to the bar in 1888.

He married Sadie E. Langford on January 17, 1889, and had four children.

Wells was a member of the Minnesota House of Representatives from 1901 to 1910. He was a Republican.

Wells died in Winter Haven, Florida on February 12, 1941. He was Baptist.
