= Billy Wells (footballer) =

Australian rules footballer, born 1916

Personal information
- Full name: William Charles Richard Wells
- Born: 1 February 1916; Richmond, Victoria
- Died: 27 May 1984 (aged 68); Eden, New South Wales
- Original team: Burnley Football Club
- Height: 182 cm (6 ft 0 in)
- Weight: 81 kg (179 lb)

Playing career^{1}
| Years | Club | Games (Goals) |
| 1936–37 | Richmond | 23 (2) |
- ^{1} Playing statistics correct to the end of 1937.

William Charles Richard Wells (1 February 1916 – 27 May 1984) (Note: In his profile, Hogan (1996), pp.243–244 has mistakenly included information (including date of birth and nickname) pertinent to Bill Wells, an entirely different individual, who played his first senior game for the North Melbourne First XVIII, at the age of 18, in 1939, in his entry for Billy Wells.) was an Australian rules footballer who played with Richmond in the Victorian Football League (VFL).

== Family ==
The son of former Fitzroy and Richmond footballer Charles "Chinger" Wells (1892–1929), and Fanny Ellen Wells (1892–1971), née Craven, William Charles Richard Wells was born in Richmond on 1 February 1916.

== Football ==
Recruited from the Burnley Football Club, for whom he had played from 1931 to 1933, he spent five seasons with Richmond (1934–1938), during which time he played in 45 Second XVIII games (1934–1938), scoring 16 goals, and in 23 First XVIII games (1934–1938), scoring 2 goals.

Playing at centre half-back, in place of Norm Dickson, and playing against Ron Todd, he was one of the best players in the Richmond side that lost to Collingwood in the 1937 First Semi-Final 10.9 (69) to 18.12 (120).
