= Jean Wells (artist) =

American artist

- Born: Seattle, Washington, U.S.
- Education: University of Washington, Burnley Art School
- Known for: Contemporary Art
- Notable work: Urban Fruit Tree, Mixed Messages, Conversation Piece, Color Blind
- Movement: Mosaic, Pop Art

Jean Wells is an American artist known for her large-scaled and life-sized mosaic sculptures featuring pop-inspired objects such as ice cream cones, hamburgers, hot dogs, and candy. Like artists Andy Warhol and Jeff Koons, Wells offers consumerist images without obvious critique, yet subtle indications are detected by some who see clues to ideological substance beneath her works.

In her early career, Wells worked in graphic design and advertising, but never stopped making art, mostly painting and sculpture. Today, her subjects blend postmodern pop culture iconography with autobiography. In recent years, she has shown at the San Diego Museum of Art, the La Jolla Athenaeum, the Frederick R. Weisman Art Foundation, the Los Angeles County Museum of Art (LACMA), the Juan Antonio Peréz Simón Collection in Mexico City, and many other notable institutions and galleries.

== Early life and education ==
Wells' parents were of Russian and Austrian/Polish extraction and members of a well known artistic family. Her uncle Rudolph F. Zallinger was a notable muralist and illustrator, having painted The Age of Reptiles in 1947 at Yale's Peabody Museum of Natural History. Wells' father Thomas Wells was a mosaicist noted for his creation in 1964 of a rendition of Theotokos and the Archangels in the apse of the St. Demetrios Greek Orthodox Church of Seattle. The entire church and mosaics complex were praised in Architecture/West for their wedding of modern architectural forms with traditional liturgical needs. The elder Wells' mosaics were among the first Byzantine-style mosaics on the West Coast of the United States. His daughter Jean, in her very early teens at the time, was his young assistant.

Jean Wells continued her arts education, receiving a B.A in Fine Arts from the University of Washington and studied further at the Burnley Art School, Seattle WA (now the Art Institute of Seattle). She also received home schooling in the arts from her family, including her uncle and father, as well as other family members who were working artists. Her grandfather was a mosaic artist and he taught Wells as well.

== Work ==
Wells debuted to the international art scene in 2007 with a solo show at the San Diego Museum of Art in Balboa Park. Giant six-foot tall sculptures of ice cream cones and sundaes, life-sized "bathing beauties" at home in an earlier era, vintage sports cars and other pop-inspired objects related to her personal life and experiences populated a show that met with popular acclaim and sales.

That same year she began a program of creating large-scal sculptures for the prestigious international art fair circuit, in this case presenting her oversized Teddy Bear as well as a collection of her food themed works and pop icons at Art Miami. She has since participated in numerous fairs including Basel, Berlin, Paris, Hong Kong, London, Aspen, Chicago, Santa Fe, San Francisco, New York, the Hamptons and many more, often with large pieces that have drawn wide audiences.

In 2008, Wells presented her monumentally scaled "Urban Fruit Tree" at the La Jolla Atheneum. A large sculpture at sixteen feet tall and eleven feet wide, this steel structure proffers mosaicked leaves and "fruit" consisting of such signature Wells icons as ice cream cones, soda pop bottles, Hershey's kisses, and hamburgers, all characteristically aglitter with variegated mosaics. A consistent favorite with the public, Urban Fruit Tree has been exhibited in several locations, including the Los Angeles County Museum of Art (LACMA). the Chicago Merchandise Mart and the Santa Fe Public Library.

In 2008, Wells created a number of other life-sized or large-scale works that were later shown in major exhibitions. Conversation Piece, an oversized Princess phone measuring 4 feet wide that still functions as a phone, was shown at the San Diego Museum. Mixed Messages, which incorporates an actual traffic signal with the words “Walk, Don’t Walk” and a female form with long legs, was purchased in 2010 for The Wonder of Our World art collection on the Allure of the Seas luxury liner. Phantom, shown at the San Diego Air and Space Museum, features a 17-foot tall Phantom jet, a recycled piece of military hardware that the artist recovered from the graveyard at Gillespie Field and covered with red, silver and blue mirrored glass mosaics.

At the same time, Wells has continued to develop themes related to food, candy and body image in a number of ongoing series, a programmatic exploration she began in 2008. Much like artists whose influence she admires such as Wayne Thiebaud, Warhol and Koons (19), Wells produces luxuriant and decorative surfaces that are seductive to broad audiences while leaving open the door to questions of critique predicated on feminist or other ideological concerns.

2010 highlights for Wells included exhibition at the prestigious Frederick R.Weisman Art Foundation, gallery exhibits in Mykonos and Amsterdam, and in December, the unveiling to the public of the monumentally scaled installation Giant Kiss at the L.A. Art Show. At twenty feet tall and twelve feet wide, this is one of Wells' largest works. Resembling a giant Hershey's Kiss, complete with silver foil, trademark paper tag and subtle chocolate scent, the installation was large enough for visitors to walk inside and cuddle on a bench to watch a film loop of couples kissing, compiled from historic silent movies.

== Themes ==
Wells works in ongoing series, programmatic explorations of objects each one of which is unique, much as Warhol individualized his silkscreened productions with variations of color, accents, material selections and substrates. Her Pop-inspired icons include ice cream, candy, food and drink, beauty, toys, graphic design and themes related to body image.

=== Ice cream ===
Wells began working on gigantic five foot tall ice cream-themed pieces in 2007. Ice Cream Moosaic (2007) was a notable early ice cream piece exhibited at the San Diego Museum of Art; it features a cow motif merged with the hot fudge sauce of the sundae. Kevin Kinsella, founder of the Kinsella Library (formerly the Copley Library) in La Jolla and producer of Jersey Boys, is a collector who owns a number of Wells' works now on view to the public, including Moosaic (2007). Wells has created numerous variations on her giant ice cream sundaes, with and without cow elements, as well as large ice cream cones and popsicles in various colors and "flavors," such as Mint Chip and Peppermint Chip (2008), Vanilla Cone With Chips (2009) and Popsicle (2010). In 2008, she retrofitted a vintage Good Humor Ice Cream Truck to act as a playful exhibition element.

=== Candy ===
The use of mosaics to create oversized sculptures of candy has struck some viewers as both tribute and critique, with the mosaics themselves echoing the candy coating and offering the pun of "eye candy". Beginning in 2008 with her Urban Fruit Tree with its rolls of Lifesavers and Hershey's Kisses, Wells has offered numerous variations in a variety of colors on the candy theme. A steady production of Lifesavers and Kisses has been supplemented with Candy Apple (2009), Bubble Gum variations (2009–2010), Dubble Bubble (2011), Lollipop (2011) and even a Gumball Machine (2009). 2010's major installation of the monumental Giant Kiss was a significant tribute to the power of chocolate and its chemically and commercially coded messages of love.

=== Food and drink ===
Echoing a time in the 50s and 60s when fast food culture "was just taking hold," Wells' approach to the major food groups of hamburgers, hotdogs, and diner fare such as pie, fries and soda pop transforms the "ordinary into the extraordinary". Wells' Urban Fruit Tree (2007) also contains these elements, but she has created gigantic variations in such pieces as the five-foot long Mustard Only (2007), the prolific Hamburger series(2008–2012), multiple iterations of Hot Dog (2007–2012), Donut (2010), Strawberry Cupcake (2010), Cherry Pie (2011), and drinks such as Corona (2008), 7 Up (2009), and Coke (2008–2012). In 2010, Wells did a series of food items that looked as if they had been enlarged and then dipped in gold or silver. Silver Cake, Silver Burger on Tray and Gold Burger are all included in this series.

=== Body image and beauty ===
Not too surprisingly with all of Wells' interest in fast food and candy, body image comes up as an early and consistent element in her oeuvre. Generously proportioned bathing beauties from an earlier era, Wells' tributes to a more rounded female form include Mabel, Bertha, Gertie and Pearl, all from 2007. Her exploration of themes related to beauty continue in a series of large lips and lipsticks, including Lipstick Pink with Gold (2007), Hot Lips (2008), Ruby Red Lipstick with Gold (2011) and Lips (2011). She created a fifteen foot tall motorized lipstick in 2007, also named Ruby Red Lipstick with Gold, which was exhibited at the L.A. Art Show in 2009.

=== Fragmented figures ===
In keeping with all the fragments of glass which make up her mosaics, Wells also has explored a long series of fragmented figures. Whether with partial faces such as can be found in Don't Lose Your Marbles (2007), Two Faced (2011) and Fish Bowl (2009), or torsos and body parts with foreign elements introduced into them such as can be found in Just Missed (2007), Mixed Messages (2007), Gaga (2010), or shoes that are missing feet such as Ruby Red Shoe (2009), Cowboy Boot (2010) Sandals (2011) and High Heel (2011), this theme has been a recurring one for the artist.

=== Toys ===
Another popular theme that Wells has explored are the arena of toys and tools for creative expression such paintbrushes and crayons. Standouts in this thematic grouping include Vintage Quackery (2008), Carousel Horse (2008–2010), 3D Glasses (2008), Hot Rod (2008), Clowning Around (2009), Teddy Bear (2009), Pinwheel (2010), Silver Bike (2010), the Paintbrush series (2010–2012), Crayons (2010–2012), Pop Gun (2011), Record Player (2011) and Guitar (2011).
