= Dino Wells =

American actor

David R. Wells Jr, also known as Dino Wells (November 3, 1970) is an American actor, writer, boxer and filmmaker.

Wells was a boxer among the amateur ranks in the early 1990s, but had to stop for to personal reasons. As an actor, Wells appeared in the television series, Prison Break as the character Trumpet's Right-hand Man in the 2005–6 season. He appeared in the 2006 film Glory Road in the uncredited role of John Anderson. He also worked as an additional production assistant on Glory Road. Wells' first TV role was on the show Mama Flora's Family where he was cast as Willie's friend (Willie played by Blair Underwood).
