= Charlie Wells (footballer) =

Australian football player

Personal information
- Full name: Charles Wells
- Born: 13 April 1892; Richmond, Victoria
- Died: 19 October 1929 (aged 37); Burnley, Victoria
- Original team: Port Melbourne Juniors
- Height: 175 cm (5 ft 9 in)
- Weight: 72 kg (159 lb)
- Position: half-back flank

Playing career^{1}
Years	Club	Games (Goals)
1912	Richmond (VFL)	5 (5)
1913–1914	Fitzroy (VFL)	15 (6)
1915, 1918	Northcote (VFA)	20 (4)
Total		40 (15)
- ^{1} Playing statistics correct to the end of 1918.

Career highlights
- Fitzroy premiership player 1913

Charles Wells (13 April 1892 – 19 October 1929) was an Australian rules football player at the Richmond Football Club and the Fitzroy Football Club in the Victorian Football League (VFL).

== Family ==
The son of William Wells, and Caroline Wells, née Blake, Charles Wells was born in Richmond, Victoria on 13 April 1892.

He married Fanny Ellen Craven (1892–1971) in 1915. Their son, William Charles Richard "Billy" Wells (1916–1984) also played with Richmond.

== Football ==
=== Richmond (VFL) ===
Wells made his debut for Richmond against St Kilda in Round 1 of the 1912 VFL season, at the Junction Oval.

=== Fitzroy (VFL) ===
Cleared from Richmond to Fitzroy on 16 April 1913, he played 15 games, and kicked 6 goals, over two seasons (1913 and 1914), becoming a premiership player for Fitzroy in the 1913 VFL Grand Final, under the captaincy of Bill Walker (the coach was Percy Parratt).

=== Northcote (VFA) ===
On 24 April 1915, Wells was cleared from Fitzroy to Northcote in the Victorian Football Association (VFA). He played in all of Northcote's thirteen matches in 1915.

The 1915 VFA competition was shortened to only 13 matches due to World War I (the last home-and-away round was on 17 July 1915). There was no VFA competition at all in 1916 and 1917. A truncated competition was conducted in 1918, with only six teams involved (including Northcote) and only 10 home-and-away matches before the finals. Wells played in seven of those 1918 matches.

== Death ==
He died at his home in Burnley, Victoria on 19 October 1929.
