= Peter Wells (cartoonist) =

American cartoonist

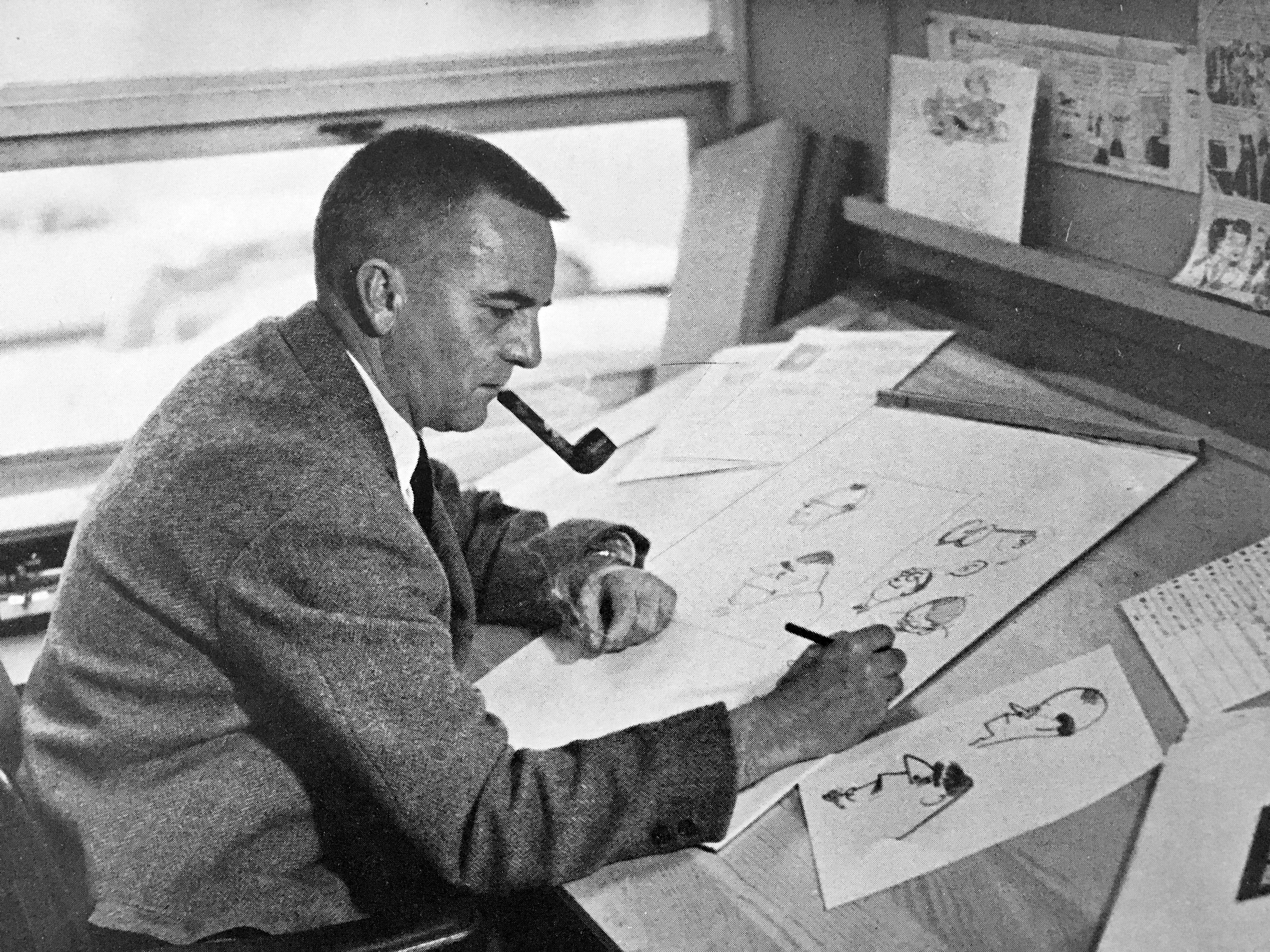
Peter Wells working for the Famous Artist School, c. 1950's

Peter Wells (January 8, 1912 – November 8, 1995) was an American cartoonist and children's book author and illustrator. He was also an instructor for the cartoon division of the Famous Artist School.

Peter was born Herbert Hilbish Wells to John and Wilhelmina (Baron) Wells, in Port Clinton, Ohio. He began creating cartoons while at Yale University, working as editor for The Yale Review. In the 1930s, he was employed by King Features Syndicate, providing cartoons for the Katzenjammer Kids series as well as other publications. Through the following decades, he supplied cartoons for Scholastic and Blue Book Magazine.

Wells was also a children's book writer and illustrator. His book, Mr. Tootwhistle's Invention, won the 1942 New York Tribune Spring Book Award. Other books by him include Dolly Madison's Surprise and The Pirate's Apprentice.

Beginning in the 1950s, Wells joined the faculty of the Famous Artist School, heading up the cartoon division along with "Bud" (Forrest Cowles) Sagendorf. Wells’ cartoons for the Famous Artist School now reside in the collection of the Norman Rockwell Museum.

He was a National Cartoonist Society member.

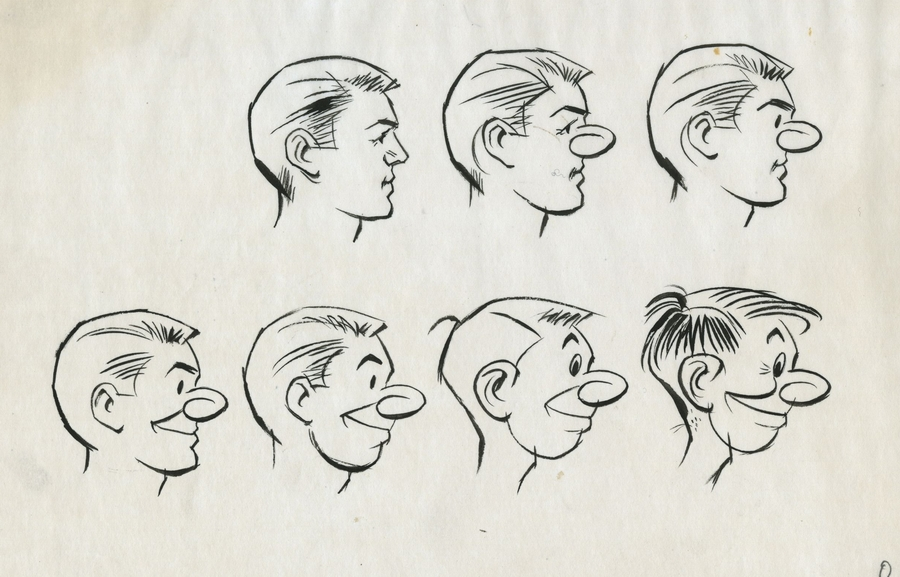
A lesson in cartooning for the Famous Artist School, c. 1960's
