= Harry Wells =

Harry Wells may refer to:

- Harry Wells (VC) (1888–1915), English soldier and Victoria Cross recipient
- Harry Wells (rugby league) (born 1932), Australian rugby league footballer
- Harry Wells (rugby union) (born 1993), British rugby union player
- Harry Gideon Wells (1875–1943), American pathologist and immunologist
- Harry Wells (Arrowverse), a character from Arrowverse franchise

== See also ==
- Harry Welles Rusk (1852–1926), U.S. representative
- Henry Wells (disambiguation)
- Harold W. Wells, Massachusetts politician
- Harrison Wells, a character from the Arrowverse
