= Jack Wells (sportscaster) =

Canadian sports radio & TV broadcaster

- Born: May 13, 1911; Moose Jaw, Saskatchewan
- Died: May 26, 1999 (aged 88); Winnipeg, Manitoba

John Hampson Wells (May 13, 1911 – May 26, 1999), also known as Cactus Jack, was a Winnipeg-based radio and television broadcaster specializing in sports.

== Biography ==
Wells's career began in Saskatoon in 1936. While listening to a hockey broadcast on CFQC, Wells boasted he could do a better job than the guy on the mike. Dared by a friend to prove his claim, Jack applied for a job at the station, and was hired.

In 1939, Wells joined CJAT in Trail, British Columbia as an all-round announcer and play-by-play man for the Trail Smoke Eaters.

In 1941, Wells got a job as a sports announcer at CJRC (later CKRC, now CFWM-FM) in Winnipeg. CJRC provided Wells with his first experience in football broadcasting, and he began calling games for the Winnipeg Blue Bombers. Jack became a free-lance broadcaster after gaining the exclusive rights to broadcast from Shea's Amphitheatre and Osborne Stadium which, in turn gave him the right to sell time to any one of the Winnipeg stations.

Jack Wells got his nickname, “Cactus,” while working as an announcer at CKY-FM. When he filled in for Porky Charbonneau on a Western-themed show, he decided he needed a unique name and chose “Cactus.” Over time, the nickname became well known in Canadian broadcasting. Jack was also famous for his weather-reporting catchphrase, “Well, it turned out nice again,” which he used even when reporting from his winter home in Phoenix, Arizona.

During his career, Jack Wells broadcast on four Winnipeg stations - CKRC, CKY, CJOB and CFRW. In the early 1950s, he became the first television voice of Western Conference Football for the CFL on CBC. In 1952, Wells turned down the play by play job on Hockey Night in Canada to remain in Winnipeg. The job eventually went to the Danny Gallivan.

Wells was closely associated with the national curling scene, beginning in 1952 when he covered his first Macdonald Brier. In the following years, Wells reported on provincial events in Manitoba, the Brier, the women's Macdonald Lassie and the World Curling Championships. Wells was appointed head of public relations in Western Canada for Macdonald Tobacco in 1970.

Wells was inducted to the CAB Hall of Fame in 1988. In recognition of his broadcasting career the City of Winnipeg named a street linking Canad Inns Stadium and the former site of Winnipeg Arena after him. He is an "Honoured Member" of the Manitoba Hockey Hall of Fame. He was inducted into the Canadian Football Hall of Fame in 1981.

Wells son, John Wells, worked with him at CKY and later became the first football play-by-play man at TSN.
