= Welles (name) =

Origin
- Origin: English
- Meaning: "spring"
- Region of origin: English

Other names
- Variant forms: Well, Wells

Welles is an English locational surname originating from Well, a village and mill in Lincolnshire. Its oldest public record is noted c. 1086. Variations include Well and Wells. Notable people with the name include:

== Surname ==
- Anne Welles, Countess of Ormond (1360–1397)
- Baron Welles (disambiguation)
- Benjamin Welles (1857-1935), American philanthropist
- Edmund Welles, American clarinetist
- Egon Wellesz (1885–1974), Austrian composer, teacher and musicologist
- Elliot Welles (1927–2006), Holocaust survivor
- Gideon Welles (1802–1878), American Secretary of the Navy
- Gwen Welles (1947–1993), film and stage actress
- Harry Welles Rusk (1852–1926), American politician
- Jeanne Kohl-Welles, American politician from Washington State
- Jennifer Welles, American porn star
- Jesse Welles, American voice actress
- Joan Welles, 9th Baroness Willoughby de Eresby (died 1475)
- John de Welles, 5th Baron Welles (1352–1421)
- John Welles, 1st Viscount Welles (1450–1499)
- Lionel de Welles, 6th Baron Welles (1406–1461)
- Martin Welles (1787–1863), American politician from Connecticut
- Mel Welles (1924-2005), American film actor
- Orson Welles (1915–1985), American actor and director
- Patricia Welles (born 1934), American writer
- Rebecca Welles, American actress
- Robert Welles, 8th Baron Willoughby de Eresby, executed 1470
- Roger Welles (1862–1932), American naval officer
- Samuel Gardner Welles (1913-1981) American journalist
- Samuel Paul Welles (1907–1997), American paleontologist
- Sumner Welles (1892–1961), U.S. Undersecretary of State
- Terri Welles (born 1956), American flight attendant, "Playmate of the year"
- Thomas Welles (1598–1660), American politician
- Tiffany Welles, a fictional character in the television series Charlie's Angels
- William Welles Hollister (1818–1886), Californian rancher and entrepreneur
- Winthrop Welles Ketcham (1820–1879), American politician
- Welles, American musician

== Fictional characters ==
- Aaron Welles, a fictional character in the Australian soap opera Home and Away
- Justine Welles, a fictional character in the Australian soap opera Home and Away
- Wade Welles, a main character from the television series Sliders

== Given name ==
- Welles Crowther (1977–2001), a hero of the 9/11 terrorist attacks on New York City

== See also ==
- Wells (name)
