= John L. Porter (politician) =

American politician

John L. Porter (September 14, 1828 - June 16, 1897) was an American farmer and local politician from Pacific, Wisconsin who served a single one-year term in the Wisconsin State Assembly.

== Background ==
Porter was born in Waterloo, New York on September 14, 1828, son of Amasa and Eliza Porter, who moved with their child to Erie County, New York in 1830. He received an academic education, and became a farmer. While still in Erie County, he married Artemesha Bates on November 1, 1849; she died in November 1850, leaving him with their son De Witt D. Porter. On May 12, 1854, he married Ann Eliza Boies of East Aurora, New York, with whom he would have three more sons between 1857 and 1862.

He came to Wisconsin in 1856 with his father and his own family, and settled on a farm in Section 26 of Pacific. There were other Porters who settled in Pacific from 1854 to 1856, and it is unclear what their relationship was to John.

== Elected office ==
Porter had held various town offices (such as tax assessor and school superintendent), and was chairman of the town's board of supervisors when he was elected in 1872 for the 26th Wisconsin Legislature (1873 session), from the 3rd Columbia County Assembly district (the Towns of Arlington, Caledonia, Dekorra, Leeds, Lodi, Lowville, Pacific, West Point and Wyocena) as a Republican, succeeding fellow Republican Jacob Low. He received 872 votes against 641 for former Democratic Assemblyman Hugh McFarlane. He was assigned to the standing committee on engrossed bills; and his son Frank (age 10) was employed as a messenger during the Assembly session. He was not a candidate for reelection in 1873, and was succeeded by fellow Republican Hiram W. Roblier.

== Later years ==
When the 1880 History of Columbia County was published, John and Ann Porter were still living on their 400-acre farm with their three youngest sons. In November 1881 he was assigned to Columbia County's petit jury for the coming year. In 1889, they moved to Portage, Wisconsin, where De Witt Porter was already living. John died in the family home in Portage on June 16, 1897, and was buried in Pacific; Ann would live until 1902.
