= Wilhelmina Dranga Campbell =

American art educator and magazine editor

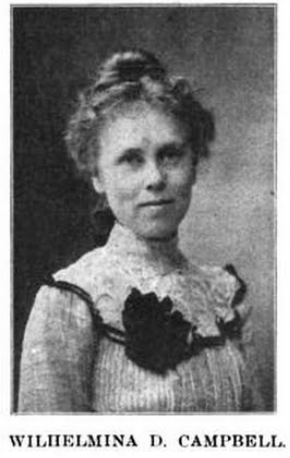
Wilhelmina Dranga Campbell, from a 1912 publication.

Wilhelmina Dranga Campbell (December 30, 1871 – November 20, 1911) was an American art educator and magazine editor, co-founder of the national magazine Outlook for the Blind.

== Early life ==
Wilhelmina Norma Dranga was born in Otsego, Wisconsin, the eighth child of Niels G. O. Dranga and Emily Ogden Dranga. Both of her parents were born in Norway. Wilhelmina was raised in Wisconsin and California. She attended the Massachusetts Normal Art School.

== Career ==
After attending the Massachusetts Normal Art School as a student, Wilhelmina Dranga joined the faculty, training teachers of drawing in the Boston area. She was also active in the school's alumni association. After she married, Wilhelmina Dranga Campbell turned to blind education, as her husband was head of the Massachusetts Organization for Promoting the Interests of the Blind, and later became head of the Pennsylvania Association for the Blind, and later still the Ohio Commission for the Blind. As an art educator by training, she devised tactile arts projects for blind women students, especially to develop marketable weaving skills. She was also co-editor of Outlook for the Blind, a quarterly magazine begun by the Campbells in 1907. In that same year, she was one of the organizers of the national conference of the American Association of Workers for the Blind, when it was held in Boston.

== Personal life ==
Wilhelmina Dranga married Charles F. F. Campbell, the son of blind educator Francis Joseph Campbell, in 1903. They had three children together, Wilhelmina, Charles, and Gertrude, born in 1904, 1906, and 1908, respectively. Wilhelmina Dranga Campbell died from pneumonia in 1911, in Columbus, Ohio, aged 39 years. "I feel the blind have lost in her a most true and devoted helper," wrote Helen Keller in reaction to the news. After Wilhelmina Campbell died, her older sister Mary Dranga married Charles F. F. Campbell, and followed her into work on blind education. Another sister, Amelia Dranga, was a medical doctor in Pittsburgh, Pennsylvania.

Artist Helen Thomas Dranga was married to Wilhelmina Dranga Campbell's brother, Theodore Dranga.
