= Jacob Low (Wisconsin politician) =

American politician

John Jacob Low (November 5, 1809 – June 24, 1875) was an American seaman, hatter, merchant, innkeeper and farmer from Lowville, Wisconsin (Lowville was named after him) who served a single one-year term in the Wisconsin State Assembly.

== Background ==
Low was born November 5, 1809, in Hyde Park, New York, to Gideon Low and Melissa Schryver. He received an academic education, and for years worked as a sailor, including as captain of an ocean steamer. He also learned the craft of hatter, an expertise of which he would often boast in later years.

On May 6, 1836, he married Catherine Morgan in her home town of Poughkeepsie, New York. They would have three sons and one daughter between 1837 and 1842. At his wife's request, he left the sea and invested his savings in a hat store in Albany, New York, but lost the business during the Panic of 1837, and was forced to return to the sea as supercargo of the ship Richmond (captained by his brother-in-law), which traded in Europe and the East Indies. On one of these voyages, he fell prey to a near-fatal bout of yellow fever, severely damaging his constitution. He returned to New York, and opened a grocery store in New York City. While there he was a member of the 7th New York Militia Regiment, known in later years as the "Blue-Bloods."

== Wisconsin ==
Having failed to prosper in New York, he came to Wisconsin Territory in early 1843, settling briefly in Green Bay (where he ran a hotel) before moving that same year to Fort Winnebago, where his father Capt. Gideon Low had been post commander. He partnered with a different brother-in-law there, running a general store for a couple of years.

In 1845 Low moved to an area where in the prior year he had staked claim to some land. It was then part of Portage County, but in 1846 became part of the new Columbia County. The area where he had settled was named Lowville after him (although the extent of Lowville township would be reduced by the county board of supervisors in 1850); the first local election was held in his home, and when in that same year a Lowville post office was created, Jacob Low was its first postmaster. Low did not, however, hold any office in the government of the town which bore his name. In 1846, Low converted his house into an inn and stage stop to accommodate travelers between Madison and Portage, which he would operate until 1853.

== Political affairs ==
Low started out as a Whig, and was elected county sheriff as a Whig in 1850. He was in later years considered a radical Republican, never having anything good to say about the Democratic Party. In 1859 he was elected Assistant Sergeant-at-Arms of the State Assembly; and in 1863 was appointed by Governor Edward Salomon as a state agent (headquartered in Memphis) to look after the interests of sick and wounded soldiers from Wisconsin.

In 1871, Low was elected for the 25th Wisconsin Legislature (1872 session), from the new 3rd Columbia County Assembly district (the Towns of Arlington, Caledonia, Dekorra, Leeds, Lodi, Lowville, Pacific, West Point and Wyocena) as a Republican, with 586 votes to 567 for Democrat John Staudenmayer. (The new district included parts of three prior districts, all of which had been represented in the prior year by Republicans.) He was assigned to the standing committee on incorporations. He was succeeded by fellow Republican John L. Porter.

== Death and interment ==
He died of tuberculosis, then called "consumption", on June 24, 1875, at his Lowville home. He and Catherine (1814–1892) are buried in the South Lowville Cemetery.
