= Hiram W. Roblier =

19th century American politician

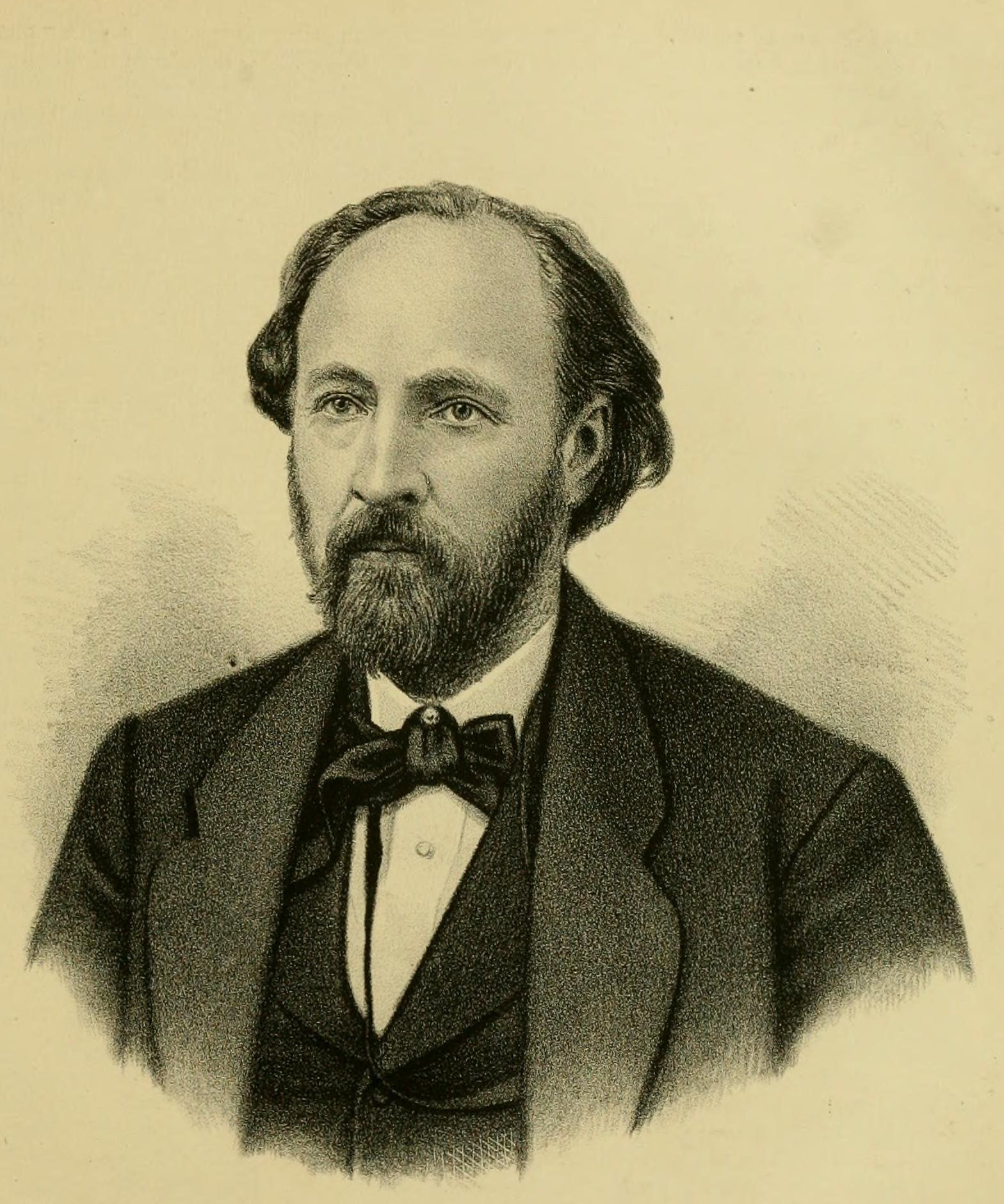
- Portrait from The History of Columbia County, Wisconsin (1880)

Member of the Wisconsin State Assembly from the Columbia 3rd district
- In office January 5, 1874 – January 4, 1875
- Preceded by: John L. Porter
- Succeeded by: John B. Dwinnell

Personal details
- Born: May 7, 1823 Big Flats, New York, U.S.
- Died: October 26, 1897 (aged 74) Coloma, Wisconsin, U.S.
- Resting place: Hillside Cemetery, Coloma, Wisconsin
- Party: Republican
- Spouse: Deborah Rowley (m. 1855–1897)
- Children: at least 2

Hiram W. Roblier (May 7, 1823 – October 26, 1897) was an American businessman and Republican politician. He served one term in the Wisconsin State Assembly, representing Columbia County.

== Biography ==
Roblier was born on May 7, 1823, in Big Flats, New York. In 1853, Roblier moved to Lowville, Wisconsin and settled in the town of Wyocena in 1854. He married Deborah Rowley or Sawley (1831–1907) in 1855. He was a farmer. Roblier served in the Wisconsin Assembly in 1874 as a Republican. He also served as chairman of the Wyocena Town Board and as Superintendent of the Poor for Columbia County, Wisconsin. In 1884, Roblier moved to Coloma, Wisconsin, and worked in the mercantile business.

Wisconsin State Assembly
Preceded by John L. Porter	Member of the Wisconsin State Assembly from the Columbia 3rd district January 5, 1874 – January 4, 1875	Succeeded by John B. Dwinnell
