= Mary Dranga Campbell =

American social worker

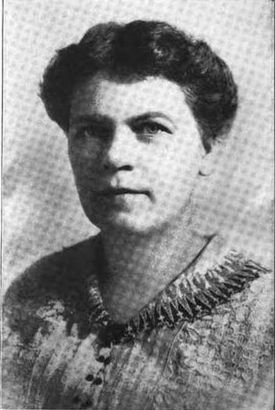
- Head and shoulders portrait photograph of Mary Dranga Campbell, from a 1916 publication.
- Born: Mary Ogden Dranga; 1867; California
- Died: August 8, 1957 (aged 89–90); Reedsville, Pennsylvania
- Occupation: Social worker

Mary Dranga Campbell (1867 – August 8, 1957), born Mary Ogden Dranga, was an American social worker, active in work on blindness prevention and rehabilitation.

== Early life and education ==
Mary Ogden Dranga was born in California, the daughter of Niels G. O. Dranga and Ingeborg Aarnas (Emily Ogden) Dranga. Her parents were Norwegian immigrants. She took library training courses at Stanford University from 1900 to 1903, earned a library certificate from the University of California, and took courses at the Chicago School of Civics and Philanthropy in 1909 and 1910.

Her sister Wilhelmina Dranga Campbell (1871-1911) was an art educator who also worked on blind causes; another sister, Amelia Dranga (1866-1933), was a medical doctor. Their sister-in-law was artist Helen Thomas Dranga (1866-1927).

== Career ==
Mary Dranga Campbell was the head cataloger at the Indiana University library for six years, from 1903 to 1909. She was Chicago field agent for the Eugenics Record Office, active in investigating the Ben-Ishmael Tribe. After marriage, she worked on the publication the Outlook for the Blind, and as the assistant attendant of the Ohio School for the Blind.

After World War I, Campbell spent three years in Serbia working with child welfare, going back to the United States to lecture on the social welfare issues that the Balkan states were facing.

In 1926, Campbell returned to her earlier work as executive director of the Council of the Blind in Pennsylvania. She became the executive secretary of the Missouri Commission of the Blind in 1929. In 1932, she was named the director of work for people with disabilities in the Brooklyn Bureau of Charities. She resigned in 1934 to become the head of the social service division of The Seeing Eye. Her work with The Seeing Eye lasted for 11 years until she retired at almost 70 years old.

Publications by Campbell included "Help for the Newly Blinded" (1942, American Journal of Nursing).

== Awards ==
Campbell received the Ambrose M. Shotwell Award from the American Association of Workers for the Blind in 1950, the Migel Medal from the American Foundation for the Blind in 1955, and was the Delta Zeta sorority's 1956 Woman of the Year.

== Personal life ==
In 1912, Mary Dranga married her sister's widower, Charles Francis Faulkner Campbell (1876-1935), the son of blind educator Sir Francis Joseph Campbell. She became a stepmother to her sister's three young children with Campbell. The couple separated in 1918. She died in 1957, aged 90 years, while living with a niece in Reedsville, Pennsylvania.
