= Amelia Dranga =

American medical doctor

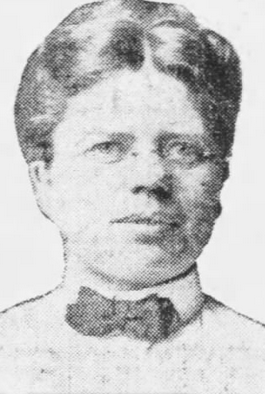
- Amelia A. Dranga, from a 1909 publication.
- Born: 1866; Otsego, Wisconsin
- Died: May 27, 1933 (aged 66–67); Pittsburgh
- Organization: American Birth Control League
- Known for: American medical doctor and public health educator
- Relatives: Mary Dranga Campbell, sister; Wilhelmina Dranga Campbell, sister; Helen Thomas Dranga, sister-in-law

Amelia Dranga (1866 — May 27, 1933) was an American medical doctor and public health educator, based in Pittsburgh, Pennsylvania.

== Early life ==
Amelia A. Dranga was born in Otsego, Wisconsin, and raised in California, the daughter of Niels G. O. Dranga and Emily Ogden Dranga. Both of her parents were born in Norway. Her younger sisters Mary Dranga Campbell and Wilhelmina Dranga Campbell both found careers in blind education. Her brother Theodore Dranga married artist Helen Thomas Dranga. She was educated at the California State Normal School in Los Angeles, and at Radcliffe College. She earned her medical degree at the Woman's Medical College of Pennsylvania.

== Career ==
Amelia Dranga taught school in Los Angeles before going east to medical school. Her internship in the Allegheny County hospitals opened the system to female medical students. She was the first woman to take the intern examination at West Penn Hospital.

From its founding in 1900 until her death 33 years later, she was the medical director of the Pittsburgh Milk and Ice Fund Association, and ran a popular twice-weekly baby clinic as part of that work.

Dranga served on the executive board of the American Birth Control League's Pennsylvania branch. She lectured on subjects from child nutrition to eugenics to sex education to Pittsburgh community groups.

Dranga was also president of the Woman's Medical Society of Western Pennsylvania. She was one of the women doctors who planned a hospital for women and children in Pittsburgh in 1902. "I do not think that there is another profession which offers such advantages to women as does the medical," Dranga declared in 1909.

Dranga was the first chairman of the Committee on Prevention of Blindness.

== Personal life ==
Late in life, Dranga publicly described "regret" that she had never married. Amelia Dranga died in 1933, aged 67 years, in Pittsburgh. The University of Pittsburgh medical school offered Amelia Dranga Scholarships in her memory, funded by the Congress of Women's Clubs of Western Pennsylvania, for women pursuing medical careers.
