= Wyocena =

Wyocena is the name of a town and a village in Columbia County, Wisconsin:

- Wyocena (town), Wisconsin
- Wyocena, Wisconsin, a village within the town of Wyocena
