= Dranga =

Dranga is a surname. Notable people with the surname include:

- Helen Thomas Dranga (1866–1940), English-born American Painter
- Pyotr Dranga (born 1984), Russian accordionist
- Ted Dranga, crew member on the second Tanager Expedition

== See also ==
- Dranga, an administrative region in the Kingdom of Licchavi
