= Jabez H. Wells =

American curler and Wisconsin State Assemblyman

Jabez Hewitt Wells (October 10, 1853 – January 24, 1930) was an American curler, hotel owner, and politician.

== Early life ==
Born in the town of Fort Winnebago, Columbia County, Wisconsin, Wells was educated in the Columbia County public schools.

== Career ==
Wells was the owner of the Emder Hotel in Portage, Wisconsin. Wells was also president of the Portage Curling Club and a member of the Crusader Rink in Portage, Wisconsin which won the international curling trophy in Manitoba, Canada. In 1882, Wells was the Portage City Clerk. From 1885 to 1887. Wells was Portage County Circuit Court clerk. Wells was a Democrat. However, Wells switched to the Republican Party when he was nominated for the county circuit court office. In 1899, Wells served in the Wisconsin State Assembly.

== Death ==
Wells died at his home in Portage, Wisconsin of pneumonia.
