= Jacob Low =

Jacob Low is a personal name. It may refer to:

- Jacob Low (squatter-legislator), Queensland squatter-landowner and member of their state parliament
- Jacob Low (Wisconsin farmer-legislator), Wisconsin farmer who served in their state legislature
