= Okee, Wisconsin =

- Unincorporated community
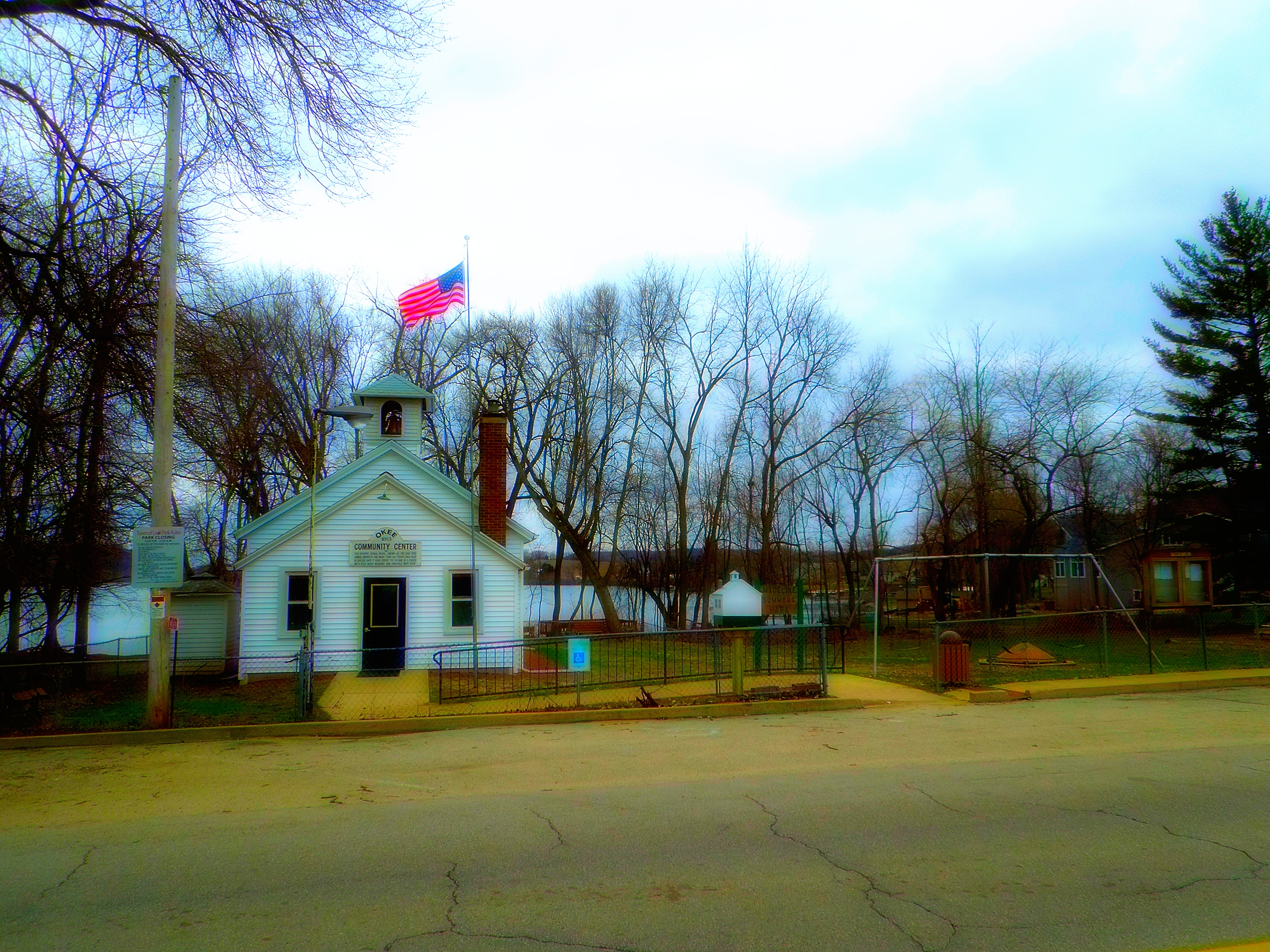

- Location within Wisconsin Location within the United States
- Coordinates: 43°21′28″N 89°34′48″W
- Country: United States
- State: Wisconsin
- County: Columbia
- Town: Lodi
- Elevation: 801 ft (244 m)
- Time zone: UTC-6 (Central (CST))
  - Summer (DST): UTC-5 (CDT)
- Area code: 608
- GNIS feature ID: 1570763

Okee is an unincorporated community located in the town of Lodi, in Columbia County, Wisconsin, United States.

Okee is the eastern terminus for the Merrimac Ferry, on the Wisconsin River.

== History ==
A post office called Okee was established in 1858, and remained in operation until it was discontinued in 1953. The name Okee is of Native American origin, reportedly meaning "evil spirits".
