= Fort Winnebago, Wisconsin =

- Town
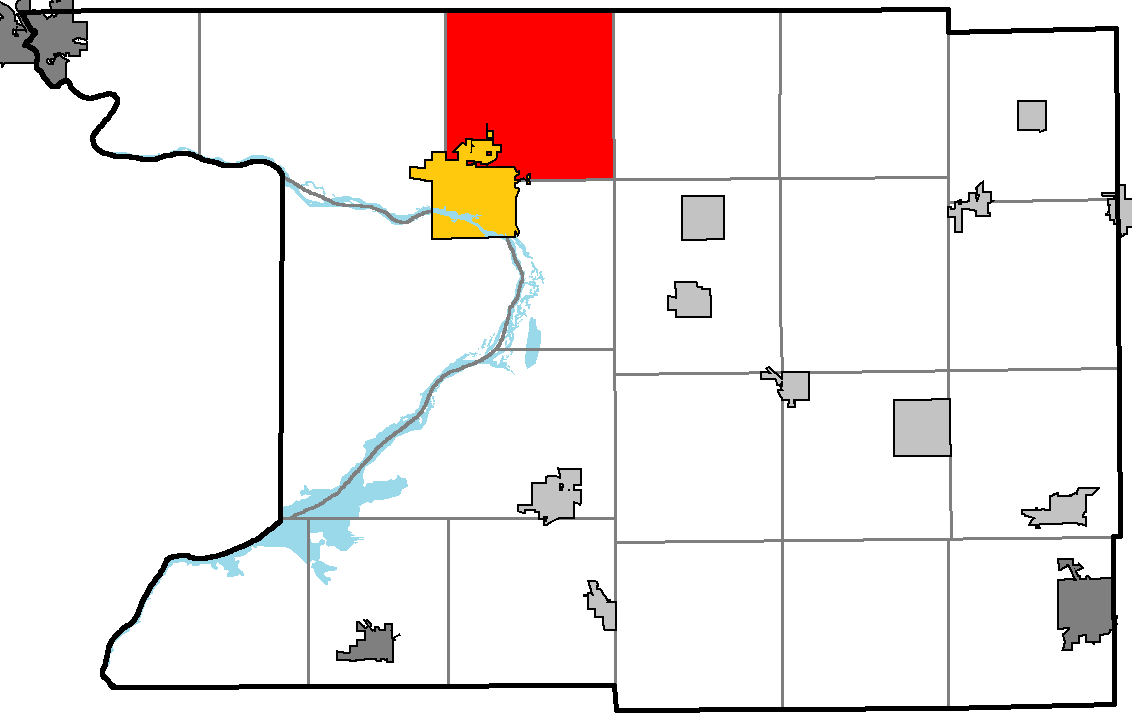
- Location of Fort Winnebago, within Columbia County, Wisconsin

- Location of Columbia County, Wisconsin
- Coordinates: 43°36′39″N 89°25′1″W
- Country: United States
- State: Wisconsin
- County: Columbia

Area
  - Total: 34 sq mi (88 km^{2})
  - Land: 33.5 sq mi (86.7 km^{2})
  - Water: 0.46 sq mi (1.2 km^{2})
- Elevation: 807 ft (246 m)

Population (2020)
  - Total: 812
  - Density: 24.3/sq mi (9.37/km^{2})
- Time zone: UTC-6 (Central (CST))
  - Summer (DST): UTC-5 (CDT)
- FIPS code: 55-26725
- GNIS feature ID: 1583220
- Website: https://fortwinn.gov/

Fort Winnebago is a town in Columbia County, Wisconsin, United States. The population was 812 at the 2020 census. The unincorporated community of Anacker is located in the town.

== Geography ==
According to the United States Census Bureau, the town has a total area of 34 square miles (88.0 km^{2}), of which 33.5 square miles (86.7 km^{2}) is land and 0.5 square mile (1.2 km^{2}) (1.41%) is water.

== Demographics ==
As of the census of 2000, there were 855 people, 325 households, and 259 families residing in the town. The population density was 25.5 people per square mile (9.9/km^{2}). There were 343 housing units at an average density of 10.2 per square mile (4/km^{2}). The racial makeup of the town was 98.83% White, 0.12% African American, 0.23% Native American, 0.23% from other races, and 0.58% from two or more races. Hispanic or Latino people of any race were 0.47% of the population.

There were 325 households, out of which 32.3% had children under the age of 18 living with them, 69.8% were married couples living together, 5.5% had a female householder with no husband present, and 20.3% were non-families. 16.6% of all households were made up of individuals, and 6.8% had someone living alone who was 65 years of age or older. The average household size was 2.63 and the average family size was 2.92.

In the town, the population was spread out, with 24.7% under the age of 18, 4.3% from 18 to 24, 29.1% from 25 to 44, 31.1% from 45 to 64, and 10.8% who were 65 years of age or older. The median age was 41 years. For every 100 females, there were 101.2 males. For every 100 females age 18 and over, there were 103.2 males.

The median income for a household in the town was $55,673, and the median income for a family was $59,167. Males had a median income of $39,375 versus $24,931 for females. The per capita income for the town was $22,171. About 2.5% of families and 3.2% of the population were below the poverty line, including 1.9% of those under age 18 and 9.4% of those age 65 or over.

== Notable people ==
- Henry Merrill, Wisconsin State Senator, postmaster of the town
- Jabez H. Wells, Wisconsin State Representative, born in the town
