= Rio, Wisconsin =

- Village
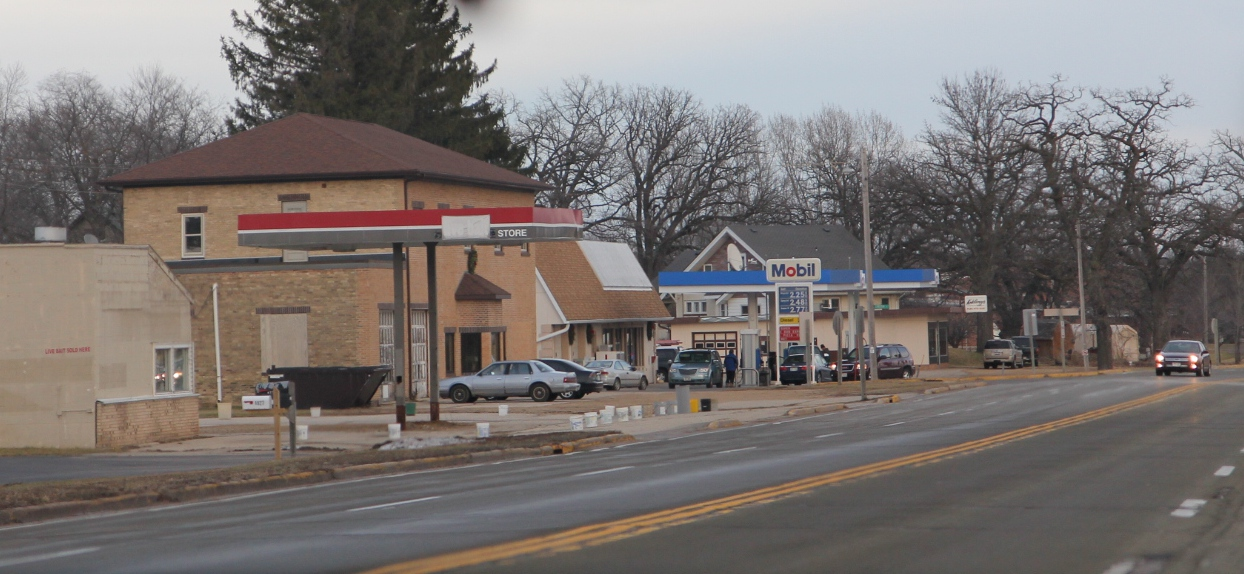
- Looking east in downtown Rio on WIS 16
- Nickname: R-10
- Location of Rio in Columbia County, Wisconsin
- Coordinates: 43°26′52″N 89°14′26″W
- Country: United States
- State: Wisconsin
- County: Columbia

Area
  - Total: 1.26 sq mi (3.27 km^{2})
  - Land: 1.25 sq mi (3.25 km^{2})
  - Water: 0.0077 sq mi (0.02 km^{2})
- Elevation: 932 ft (284 m)

Population (2020)
  - Total: 1,119
  - Density: 892/sq mi (344/km^{2})
- Time zone: UTC-6 (Central (CST))
  - Summer (DST): UTC-5 (CDT)
- ZIP code: 53960
- Area code: 920
- FIPS code: 55-68100
- GNIS feature ID: 1572330
- Website: https://www.riowi.gov/

Rio /ˈraɪ.oʊ/ (pronounced "rye-oh") is a village in Columbia County, Wisconsin, United States. The population was 1,119 at the 2020 United States Census. It is part of the Madison Metropolitan Statistical Area. The village rests primarily in the town of Otsego. The Village of Rio calls itself "Camper Country USA" due to several campgrounds located near the village. Rio is halfway between Columbus and Portage on Highway 16.

== Geography ==
Rio is located at 43°26′52″N 89°14′26″W (43.447914, -89.240557).

According to the United States Census Bureau, the village has a total area of 1.27 square miles (3.29 km^{2}), of which 1.26 square miles (3.26 km^{2}) is land and 0.01 square miles (0.03 km^{2}) is water.

== Government ==
As a village, Rio is governed by a village board of trustees consisting of a village president and six village trustees. The president and trustees are elected in village-wide elections to two-year terms. The current village president is James Thomas Olrick, who has been in office since 2011.

== Demographics ==
Historical population
| Census | Pop. | Note | %± |
|---|---|---|---|
| 1870 | 300 | | — |
| 1880 | 230 | | −23.3% |
| 1890 | 339 | | 47.4% |
| 1900 | 479 | | 41.3% |
| 1910 | 704 | | 47.0% |
| 1920 | 620 | | −11.9% |
| 1930 | 641 | | 3.4% |
| 1940 | 696 | | 8.6% |
| 1950 | 741 | | 6.5% |
| 1960 | 788 | | 6.3% |
| 1970 | 792 | | 0.5% |
| 1980 | 785 | | −0.9% |
| 1990 | 768 | | −2.2% |
| 2000 | 938 | | 22.1% |
| 2010 | 1,059 | | 12.9% |
| 2020 | 1,119 | | 5.7% |

=== 2010 census ===
As of the census of 2010, there were 1,059 people, 436 households, and 292 families living in the village. The population density was 840.5 inhabitants per square mile (324.5/km^{2}). There were 475 housing units at an average density of 377 per square mile (145.6/km^{2}). The racial makeup of the village was 97.7% White, 0.2% African American, 0.2% Native American, 0.3% Asian, 0.1% Pacific Islander, 0.3% from other races, and 1.2% from two or more races. Hispanic or Latino people of any race were 1.4% of the population.

There were 436 households, of which 36% had children under the age of 18 living with them, 51.1% were married couples living together, 9.4% had a female householder with no husband present, 6.4% had a male householder with no wife present, and 33% were non-families. 27.1% of all households were made up of individuals, and 13.3% had someone living alone who was 65 years of age or older. The average household size was 2.43 and the average family size was 2.96.

The median age in the village was 35.8 years. 26.7% of residents were under the age of 18; 6.4% were between the ages of 18 and 24; 29.9% were from 25 to 44; 23.7% were from 45 to 64; and 13.3% were 65 years of age or older. The gender makeup of the village was 48.4% male and 51.6% female.

=== 2000 census ===
As of the census of 2000, there were 938 people, 379 households, and 258 families living in the village. The population density was 751.4 people per square mile (289.7/km^{2}). There were 401 housing units at an average density of 321.2 per square mile (123.9/km^{2}). The racial makeup of the village was 98.08% White, 0.11% African American, 0.21% Native American, 0.75% from other races, and 0.85% from two or more races. Hispanic or Latino people of any race were 1.71% of the population.

There were 379 households, out of which 35.4% had children under the age of 18 living with them, 54.9% were married couples living together, 9% had a female householder with no husband present, and 31.9% were non-families. 26.1% of all households were made up of individuals, and 10.8% had someone living alone who was 65 years of age or older. The average household size was 2.45 and the average family size was 2.95.

In the village, the population was spread out, with 25.3% under the age of 18, 6.6% from 18 to 24, 33% from 25 to 44, 18.4% from 45 to 64, and 16.6% who were 65 years of age or older. The median age was 38 years. For every 100 females, there were 95.4 males. For every 100 females age 18 and over, there were 94.7 males.

The median income for a household in the village was $42,292, and the median income for a family was $49,500. Males had a median income of $34,118 versus $26,023 for females. The per capita income for the village was $17,668. About 3.1% of families and 4.9% of the population were below the poverty line, including 3.3% of those under age 18 and 8.3% of those age 65 or over.

== Civic Organizations ==
- Rio American Legion Post 208, located one block east of downtown on East Harvey Street
- Rio Conservation Club, dedicated to the preservation of wildlife and nature
- Rio Community Club, promoting community and local business

== Transportation ==
Gilbert Field airport (94C) is a public use grass field with one east–west runway (9/27). The field is privately owned and operated by Rio Aero Club Inc. Every year the Rio Aero Club Inc. hosts a fly-in breakfast. CTAF 122.9

== Notable people ==
- Debbie McCormick, Olympic curler

== Images ==
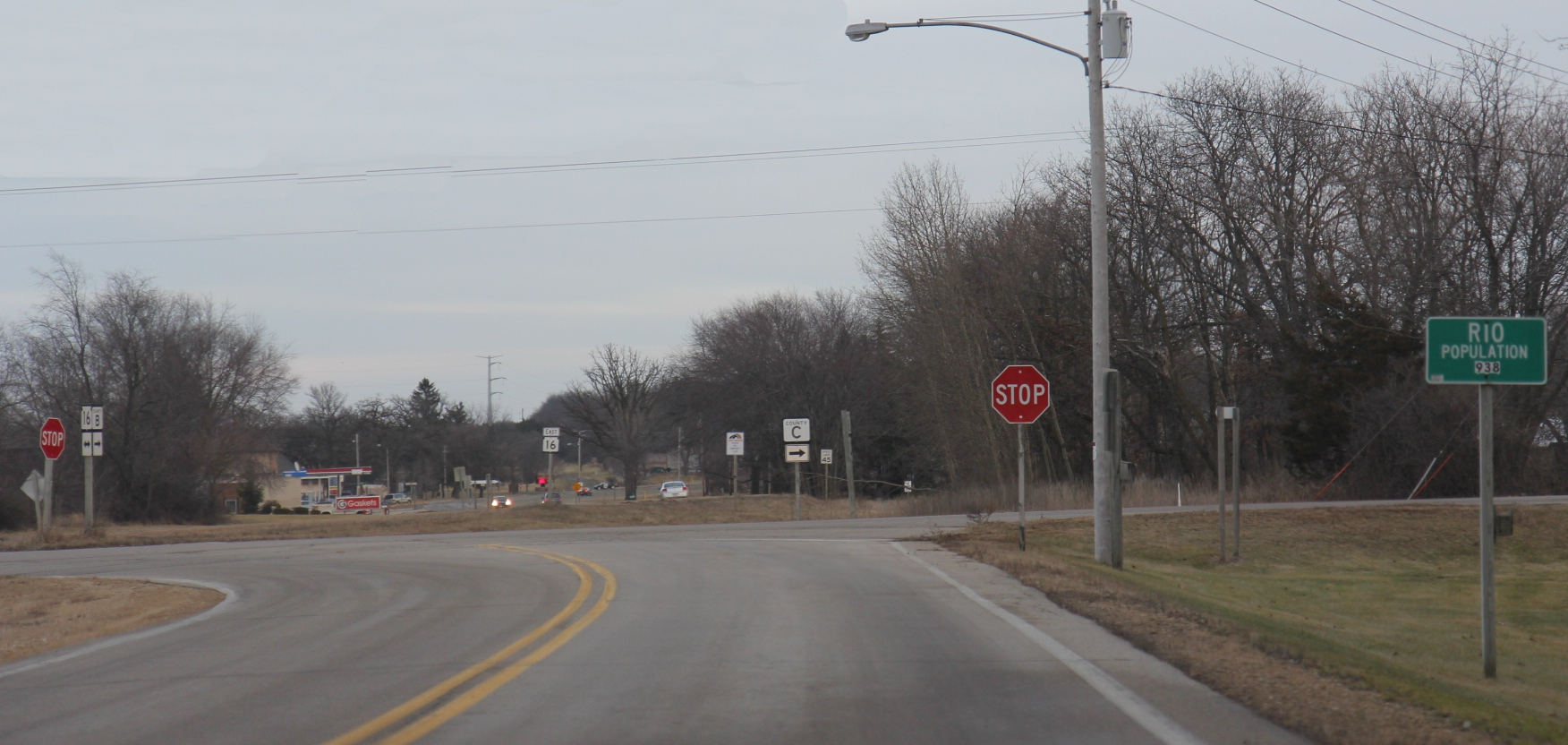
The sign for Rio on County Highway B

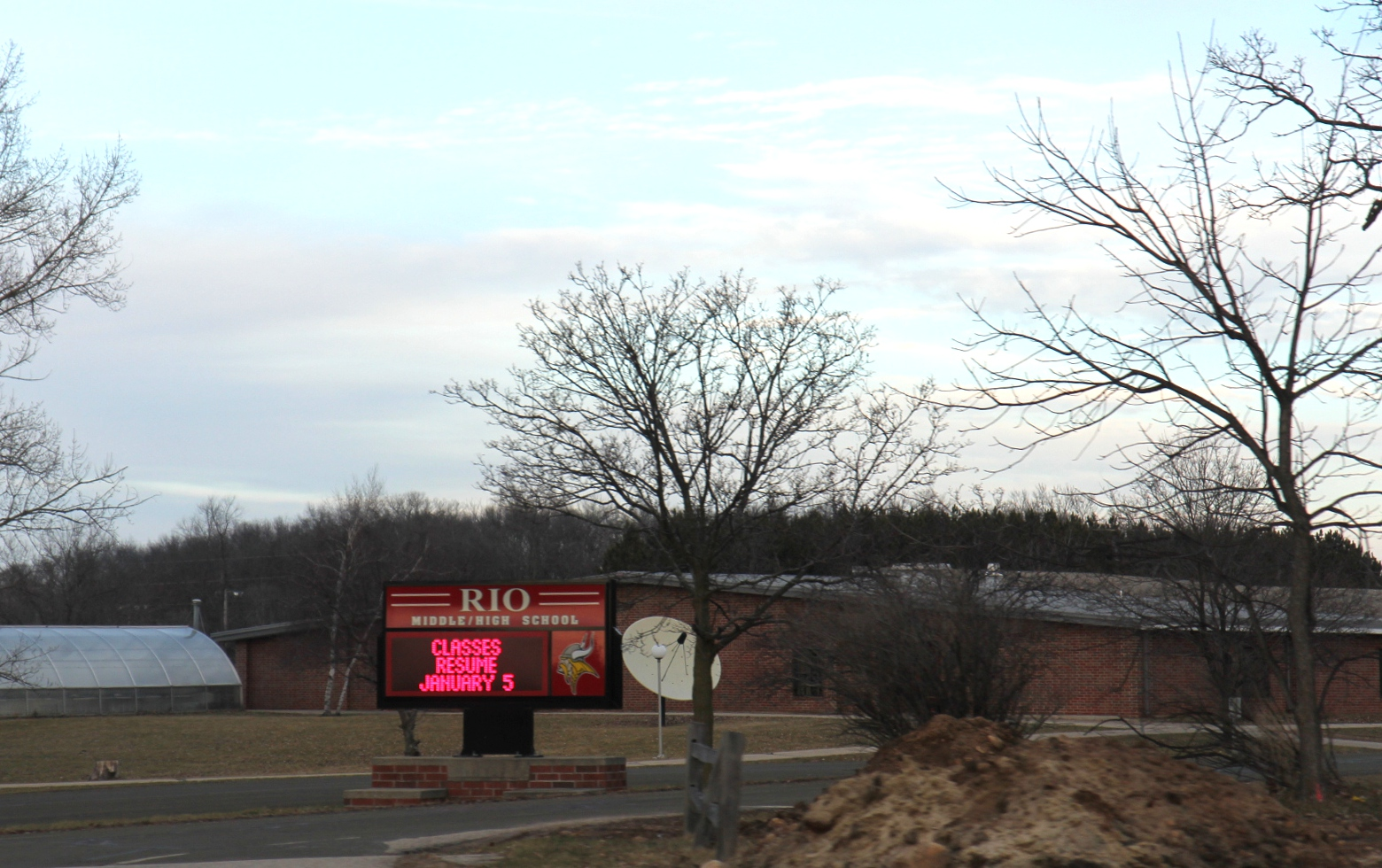
Rio High School

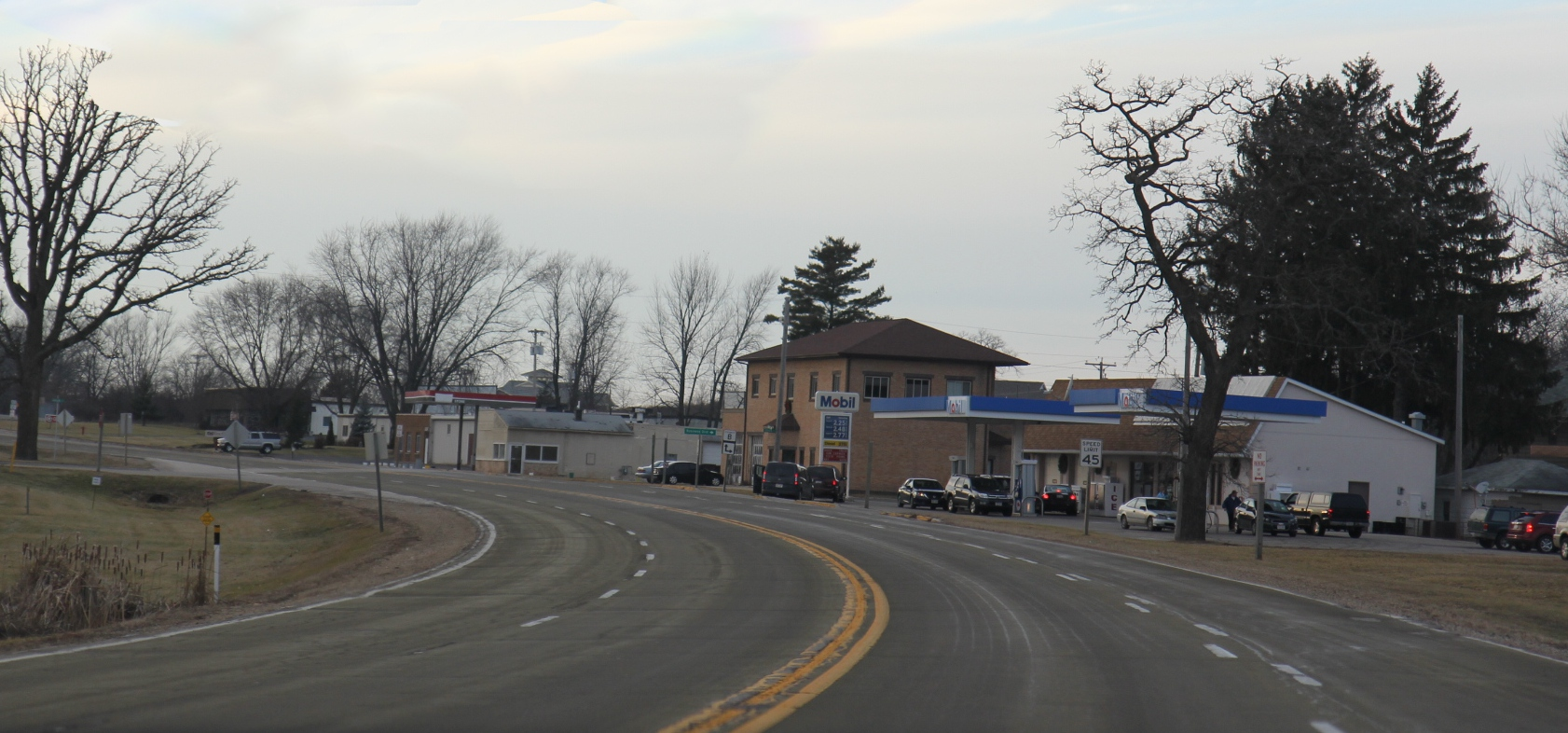
Looking west in downtown Rio on Wisconsin Highway 16
