= Marcellon, Wisconsin =

- Town
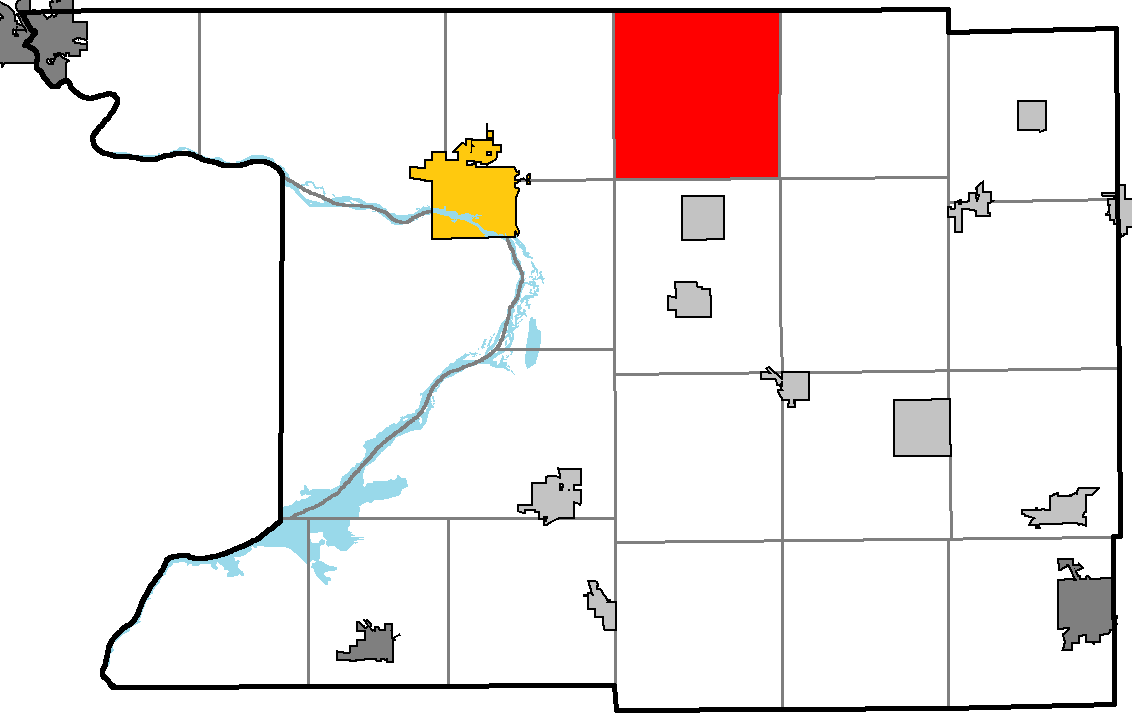
- Location of Marcellon, within Columbia County, Wisconsin

- Location of Columbia County, Wisconsin
- Coordinates: 43°35′58″N 89°18′37″W
- Country: United States
- State: Wisconsin
- County: Columbia

Area
  - Total: 35.8 sq mi (92.7 km^{2})
  - Land: 35.5 sq mi (91.9 km^{2})
  - Water: 0.27 sq mi (0.7 km^{2})
- Elevation: 928 ft (283 m)

Population (2020)
  - Total: 1,140
  - Density: 32.1/sq mi (12.4/km^{2})
- Time zone: UTC-6 (Central (CST))
  - Summer (DST): UTC-5 (CDT)
- FIPS code: 55-49150
- GNIS feature ID: 1583650
- Website: https://townofmarcellon.com/

Marcellon is a town in Columbia County, Wisconsin, United States. The population was 1,140 at the 2020 census. The unincorporated community of Belle Fountain is located in the town.

== Geography ==
According to the United States Census Bureau, the town has a total area of 35.8 square miles (92.7 km^{2}), of which 35.5 square miles (91.9 km^{2}) is land and 0.3 square mile (0.7 km^{2}) (0.78%) is water.

== Demographics ==
As of the census of 2000, there were 1,024 people, 362 households, and 287 families residing in the town. The population density was 28.8 people per square mile (11.1/km^{2}). There were 380 housing units at an average density of 10.7 per square mile (4.1/km^{2}). The racial makeup of the town was 98.93% White, 0.1% Asian, 0.1% Pacific Islander, 0.20% from other races, and 0.68% from two or more races. Hispanic or Latino people of any race were 0.59% of the population.

There were 362 households, out of which 32.3% had children under the age of 18 living with them, 72.4% were married couples living together, 2.5% had a female householder with no husband present, and 20.7% were non-families. 15.7% of all households were made up of individuals, and 6.1% had someone living alone who was 65 years of age or older. The average household size was 2.83 and the average family size was 3.16.

In the town, the population was spread out, with 27.1% under the age of 18, 7.1% from 18 to 24, 26.8% from 25 to 44, 29.4% from 45 to 64, and 9.6% who were 65 years of age or older. The median age was 39 years. For every 100 females, there were 107.3 males. For every 100 females age 18 and over, there were 101.6 males.

The median income for a household in the town was $48,333, and the median income for a family was $50,625. Males had a median income of $31,759 versus $24,760 for females. The per capita income for the town was $19,488. About 6.7% of families and 8.2% of the population were below the poverty line, including 9.9% of those under age 18 and 13.5% of those age 65 or over.
