= Gilbert Field =

Airport in Wisconsin, United States

- IATA: none; ICAO: none; FAA LID: 94C

Summary
- Airport type: Public
- Owner: Rio Aero Club, Inc.
- Serves: Rio, Wisconsin
- Opened: August 1963
- Time zone: CST (UTC−06:00)
  - Summer (DST): CDT (UTC−05:00)
- Elevation AMSL: 925 ft (282 m)
- Coordinates: 43°27′0″N 89°15′0″W

Map
- Location of airport in Wisconsin 94C (the United States)

Runways
Direction	Length		Surface
Direction	ft	m	Surface
9/27	1,092	333	Turf

Statistics
- Aircraft operations (2023): 5,805
- Based aircraft (2024): 8
- Source: Federal Aviation Administration

Gilbert Field (FAA LID: 94C) is a public use airport located one nautical mile (2 km) west of the central business district of Rio, a village in Columbia County, Wisconsin, United States. It is privately owned by Rio Aero Club, Inc.

== Facilities and aircraft ==
Gilbert Field covers an area of 42 acres (17 ha) at an elevation of 925 feet (282 m) above mean sea level. It has one runway designated 9/27 with a 1,092 x 65 ft. (333 x 20 m) turf surface.

For the 12-month period ending June 7, 2023, the airport had 5,805 aircraft operations, an average of 15 per day: 99% general aviation and less than 1% military. In July 2024, there were 8 aircraft based at this airport: 7 single-engine and 1 ultralight.

== See also ==
- List of airports in Wisconsin
