= Dekorra (community), Wisconsin =

Census-designated place in Wisconsin, United States

Dekorra, Wisconsin
- Census-designated place
- Location within Wisconsin Location within the United States
- Coordinates: 43°27′27″N 89°28′03″W
- Country: United States
- State: Wisconsin
- County: Columbia
- Town: Dekorra
- Elevation: 807 ft (246 m)

Population (2020)
  - Total: 255
- Time zone: UTC-6 (Central (CST))
  - Summer (DST): UTC-5 (CDT)
- Area code: 608
- GNIS feature ID: 1563868

Dekorra is an unincorporated community and census-designated place located in the town of Dekorra, Columbia County, Wisconsin, United States. Dekorra is located on the Wisconsin River and County Highway V, 5.7 miles (9.2 km) south of Portage.

The community had a population of 255 as of the 2020 United States Census.
