= Randolph (town), Wisconsin =

Randolph, Wisconsin
- Town
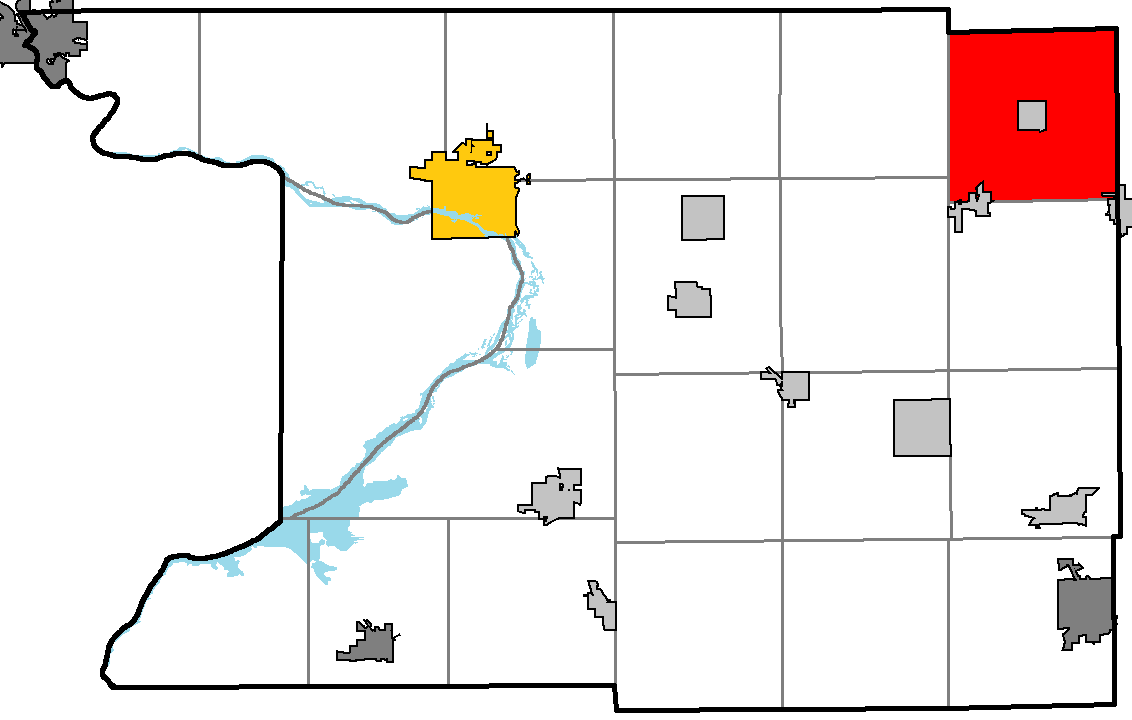
- Location of Randolph, within Columbia County, Wisconsin

- Location of Columbia County, Wisconsin
- Coordinates: 43.5631484°N 89.0672715°W
- Country: United States
- State: Wisconsin
- County: Columbia

Area
  - Total: 35.09 sq mi (90.9 km^{2})
  - Land: 35 sq mi (91 km^{2})
  - Water: 0.09 sq mi (0.23 km^{2})
- Elevation: 980 ft (300 m)

Population (2020)
  - Total: 762
  - Density: 22/sq mi (8.4/km^{2})
- Time zone: UTC-6 (Central (CST))
  - Summer (DST): UTC-5 (CDT)
- Area code: 920

Randolph is a town in Columbia County, Wisconsin, United States. The population was 762 at the 2020 census. The Village of Randolph lies to the southeast of the town and only a tiny portion of the village is within the town. The unincorporated community of East Friesland is located in the town. The unincorporated community of Ingle is also partially located in the town.

== History ==
The town was incorporated in 1870.

== Geography ==
According to the United States Census Bureau, the town has a total area of 35.1 square miles (91 km^{2}), of which 35.1 square miles (91 km^{2}) is land and 0.03% is water.

== Demographics ==
As of the census of 2000, there were 699 people, 228 households, and 194 families residing in the town. The population density was 19.9 people per square mile (7.7/km^{2}). There were 240 housing units at an average density of 6.8 per square mile (2.6/km^{2}). The racial makeup of the town was 97.42% White, 0.14% Black or African American, 0.29% Native American, 0.14% Asian, 2% from other races. 2.43% of the population were Hispanic or Latino of any race.

There were 228 households, out of which 41.2% had children under the age of 18 living with them, 78.9% were married couples living together, 3.5% had a female householder with no husband present, and 14.5% were non-families. 11.8% of all households were made up of individuals, and 6.6% had someone living alone who was 65 years of age or older. The average household size was 3.07 and the average family size was 3.33.

In the town, the population was spread out, with 32.9% under the age of 18, 6.6% from 18 to 24, 26.6% from 25 to 44, 20.9% from 45 to 64, and 13% who were 65 years of age or older. The median age was 34 years. For every 100 females, there were 102.6 males. For every 100 females age 18 and over, there were 109.4 males.

The median income for a household in the town was $41,250, and the median income for a family was $45,000. Males had a median income of $32,917 versus $23,194 for females. The per capita income for the town was $16,670. About 5.9% of families and 9.6% of the population were below the poverty line, including 14% of those under age 18 and 7% of those age 65 or over.
