= Scott, Columbia County, Wisconsin =

Scott, Wisconsin
- Town
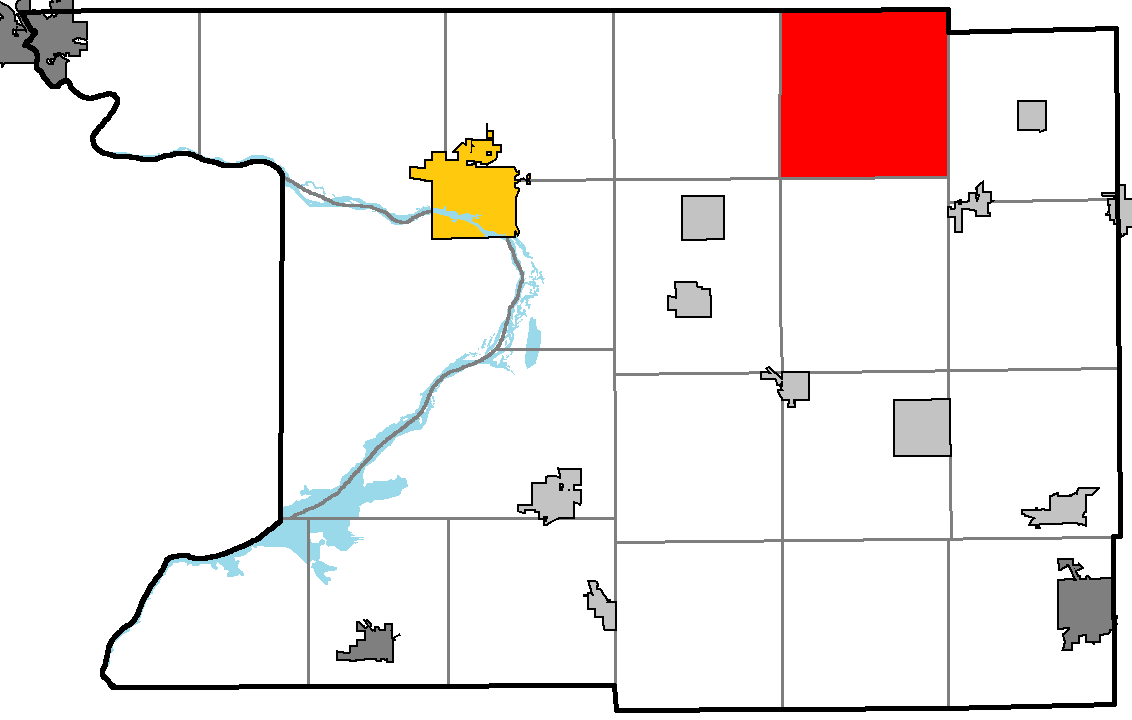
- Location of Scott, within Columbia County, Wisconsin

- Location of Columbia County, Wisconsin
- Coordinates: 43°35′51″N 89°11′38″W
- Country: United States
- State: Wisconsin
- County: Columbia

Area
  - Total: 35.8 sq mi (92.8 km^{2})
  - Land: 35.8 sq mi (92.8 km^{2})
  - Water: 0 sq mi (0 km^{2})
- Elevation: 840 ft (256 m)

Population (2020)
  - Total: 857
  - Density: 23.9/sq mi (9.23/km^{2})
- Time zone: UTC-6 (Central (CST))
  - Summer (DST): UTC-5 (CDT)
- FIPS code: 55-72250
- GNIS feature ID: 1584115

Scott is a town in Columbia County, Wisconsin, United States. The population was 857 at the 2020 census. The unincorporated community of Ingle is located partially in the town. The town is named for Winfield Scott who, at the time of the town's formation in 1849, was a hero of the Mexican–American War.

== Geography ==
According to the United States Census Bureau, the town has a total area of 35.8 square miles (92.8 km^{2}), all land.

== Demographics ==
As of the census of 2000, there were 791 people, 243 households, and 187 families residing in the town. The population density was 22.1 people per square mile (8.5/km^{2}). There were 260 housing units at an average density of 7.3 per square mile (2.8/km^{2}). The racial makeup of the town was 95.58% White, 0.63% from other races, and 3.79% from two or more races. Hispanic or Latino people of any race were 2.15% of the population.

There were 243 households, out of which 44.4% had children under the age of 18 living with them, 70.0% were married couples living together, 4.9% had a female householder with no husband present, and 23% were non-families. 19.8% of all households were made up of individuals, and 11.1% had someone living alone who was 65 years of age or older. The average household size was 3.26 and the average family size was 3.81.

In the town, the population was spread out, with 37.3% under the age of 18, 5.9% from 18 to 24, 27.6% from 25 to 44, 19.6% from 45 to 64, and 9.6% who were 65 years of age or older. The median age was 31 years. For every 100 females, there were 104.9 males. For every 100 females age 18 and over, there were 113.8 males.

The median income for a household in the town was $38,839, and the median income for a family was $41,250. Males had a median income of $30,673 versus $23,125 for females. The per capita income for the town was $13,757. About 10.5% of families and 16.7% of the population were below the poverty line, including 27.9% of those under age 18 and 7.6% of those age 65 or over.
