= Ingle, Wisconsin =

- Unincorporated community
- Location within Wisconsin Location within the United States
- Coordinates: 43°37′28″N 89°07′40″W
- Country: United States
- State: Wisconsin
- County: Columbia
- Towns: Randolph, Scott
- Elevation: 932 ft (284 m)
- Time zone: UTC-6 (Central (CST))
  - Summer (DST): UTC-5 (CDT)
- Area code: 608
- GNIS feature ID: 1577590

Ingle is an unincorporated community located in the towns of Randolph and Scott, Columbia County, Wisconsin, United States. Ingle is located 4.5 miles (7.2 km) southeast of Dalton and 8.5 miles (13.7 km) south of Marquette. The community was named after James Inglehart, who settled the region in 1842.
