= Belle Fountain, Wisconsin =

- Unincorporated community
- Location within Wisconsin Location within the United States
- Coordinates: 43°36′52″N 89°15′48″W
- Country: United States
- State: Wisconsin
- County: Columbia
- Town: Marcellon
- Elevation: 876 ft (267 m)
- Time zone: UTC-6 (Central (CST))
  - Summer (DST): UTC-5 (CDT)
- Area code: 608
- GNIS feature ID: 1577512

Belle Fountain is an unincorporated community located in the town of Marcellon, Columbia County, Wisconsin, United States. Local history holds that the community was named for a nearby body of water.
