= Anacker, Wisconsin =

- Unincorporated community
- Location within Wisconsin Location within the United States
- Coordinates: 43°37′32″N 89°26′37″W
- Country: United States
- State: Wisconsin
- County: Columbia
- Town: Fort Winnebago
- Elevation: 781 ft (238 m)
- Time zone: UTC-6 (Central (CST))
  - Summer (DST): UTC-5 (CDT)
- Area code: 608
- GNIS feature ID: 1577491

Anacker is an unincorporated community located in the town of Fort Winnebago, Columbia County, Wisconsin, United States. The community was named after William Anacker, who served in the Union army during the Civil War and was instrumental in the formation of the community.
