= Lowville, Wisconsin =

- Town
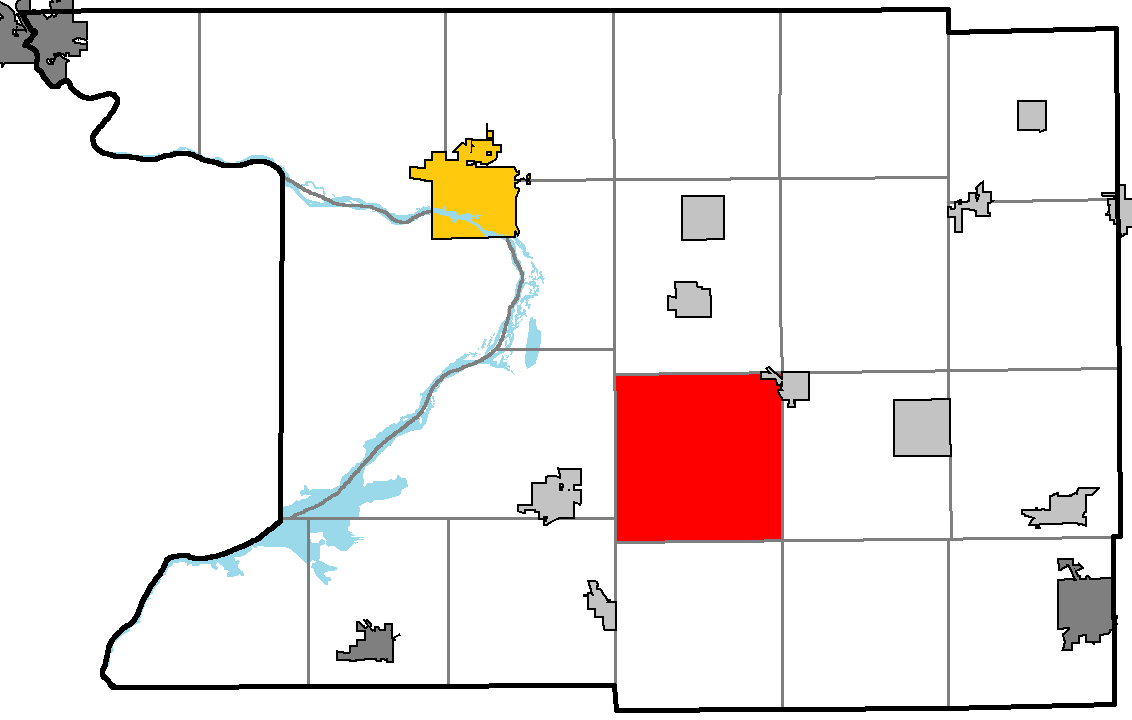
- Location of Lowville, within Columbia County, Wisconsin

- Location of Columbia County, Wisconsin
- Coordinates: 43°25′29″N 89°17′22″W
- Country: United States
- State: Wisconsin
- County: Columbia

Area
  - Total: 35.7 sq mi (92.5 km^{2})
  - Land: 34.2 sq mi (88.7 km^{2})
  - Water: 1.5 sq mi (3.8 km^{2})
- Elevation: 932 ft (284 m)

Population (2020)
  - Total: 1,017
  - Density: 29.7/sq mi (11.5/km^{2})
- Time zone: UTC-6 (Central (CST))
  - Summer (DST): UTC-5 (CDT)
- FIPS code: 55-46050
- GNIS feature ID: 1583602
- Website: https://www.lowville.wi.gov/

Lowville is a town in Columbia County, Wisconsin, United States. The population was 1,017 at the 2020 census.

== History ==
When the county was organized in 1846, survey Township 10, Range 10; the south half of Township 1, Range 10; and the east half of Township 10, Range 9, were made into a voting precinct under the name of Lowville, after local pioneer Jacob Low. In January 1849, the county board designated Townships 10 and 11 of Range 10, and the east half of Township 10, Range 9, as a new civil town, given the same name of Lowville, and Low's home was designated as the voting place for the town's first election. At a meeting of the County Board of Supervisors on January 8, 1850, the town of Lowville was reduced to just Township 11, Range 10.

== Geography ==
According to the United States Census Bureau, the town has a total area of 35.7 square miles (92.5 km^{2}), of which 34.3 square miles (88.7 km^{2}) is land and 1.5 square miles (3.8 km^{2}) is water. The total area is 4.11% water.

== Demographics ==
As of the census of 2000, there were 987 people, 368 households, and 294 families residing in the town. The population density was 28.8 people per square mile (11.1/km^{2}). There were 394 housing units at an average density of 11.5 per square mile (4.4/km^{2}). The racial makeup of the town was 97.97% White, 0% African American, 0.41% Native American, 0.91% Asian, 0% Pacific Islander, 0% from other races, and 0.71% from two or more races. 0.61% of the population were Hispanic or Latino of any race.

There were 368 households, out of which 29.3% had children under the age of 18 living with them, 71.7% were married couples living together, 4.9% had a female householder with no husband present, and 20.1% were non-families. 17.1% of all households were made up of individuals, and 8.4% had someone living alone who was 65 years of age or older. The average household size was 2.68 and the average family size was 2.99.

In the town, the population was spread out, with 23.5% under the age of 18, 6.4% from 18 to 24, 28.4% from 25 to 44, 29.1% from 45 to 64, and 12.7% who were 65 years of age or older. The median age was 41 years. For every 100 females, there were 105.2 males. For every 100 females age 18 and over, there were 103.5 males.

The median income for a household in the town was $54,519, and the median income for a family was $57,500. Males had a median income of $35,515 versus $27,300 for females. The per capita income for the town was $20,039. 3.8% of the population and 3% of families were below the poverty line. Out of the total population, 4.4% of those under the age of 18 and 6.5% of those 65 and older were living below the poverty line.
