= Dekorra, Wisconsin =

- Town
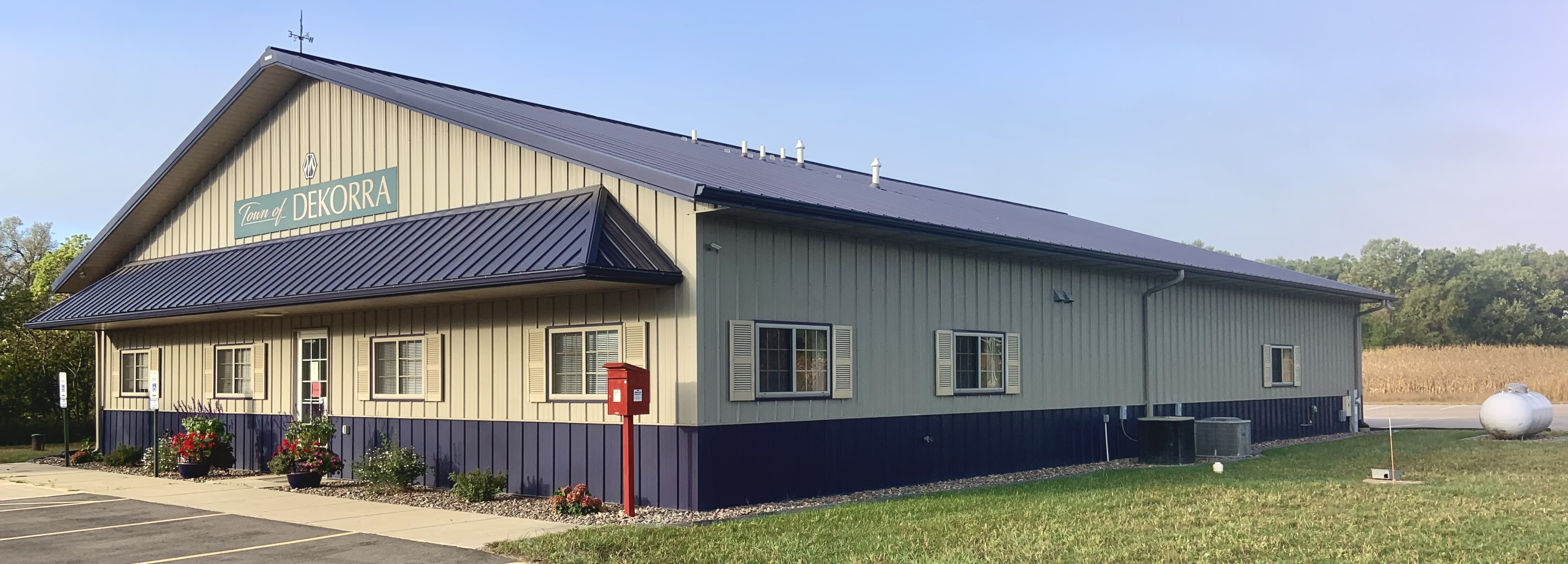
- Town hall
- Motto: "Beautifully Situated"
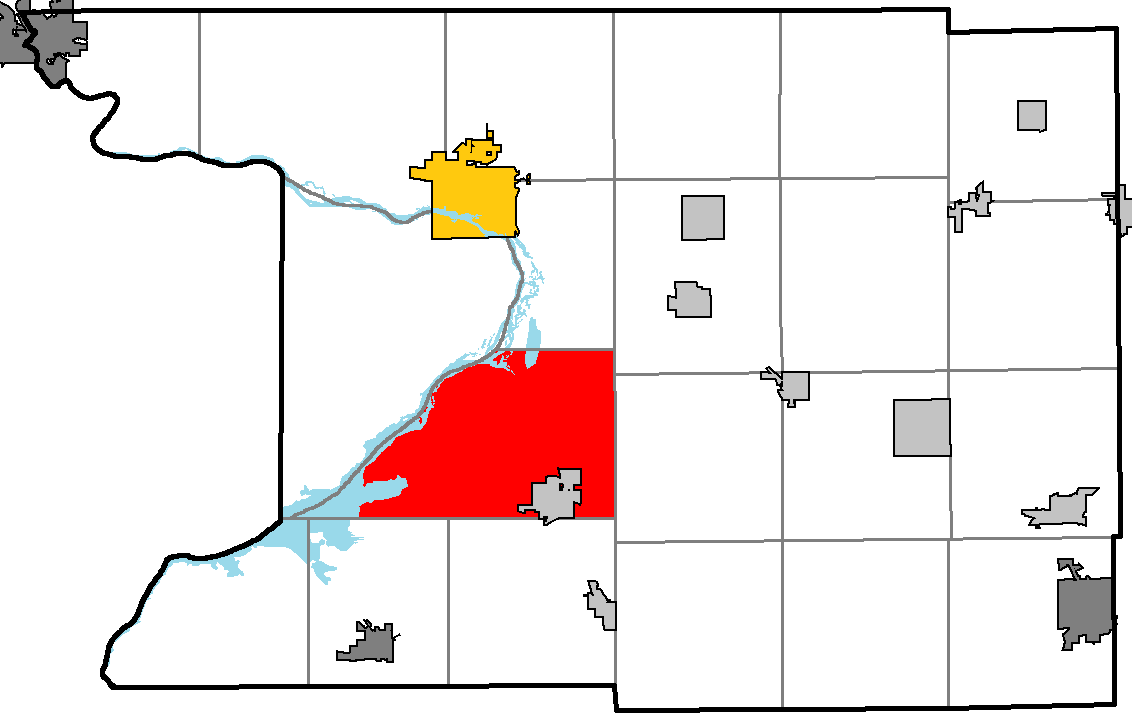
- Location of Dekorra, within Columbia County, Wisconsin

- Location of Columbia County, Wisconsin
- Coordinates: 43°25′5″N 89°26′43″W
- Country: United States
- State: Wisconsin
- County: Columbia

Area
  - Total: 45.0 sq mi (116.5 km^{2})
  - Land: 41.2 sq mi (106.6 km^{2})
  - Water: 3.9 sq mi (10 km^{2})
- Elevation: 942 ft (287 m)

Population (2020)
  - Total: 2,500
  - Density: 61/sq mi (23/km^{2})
- Time zone: UTC-6 (Central (CST))
  - Summer (DST): UTC-5 (CDT)
- FIPS code: 55-19375
- GNIS feature ID: 1583065
- Website: Town of Dekorra, Columbia County, Wisconsin

Dekorra is a town in Columbia County, Wisconsin, United States. The population was 2,500 at the 2020 census. It contains the census-designated place of the same name.

== History ==
Native American Indians originally lived in the area. The town was laid out in 1836 when settlers from Kentucky came to the area. It was named after a respected Ho-Chunk leader named Decorah.

== Geography ==
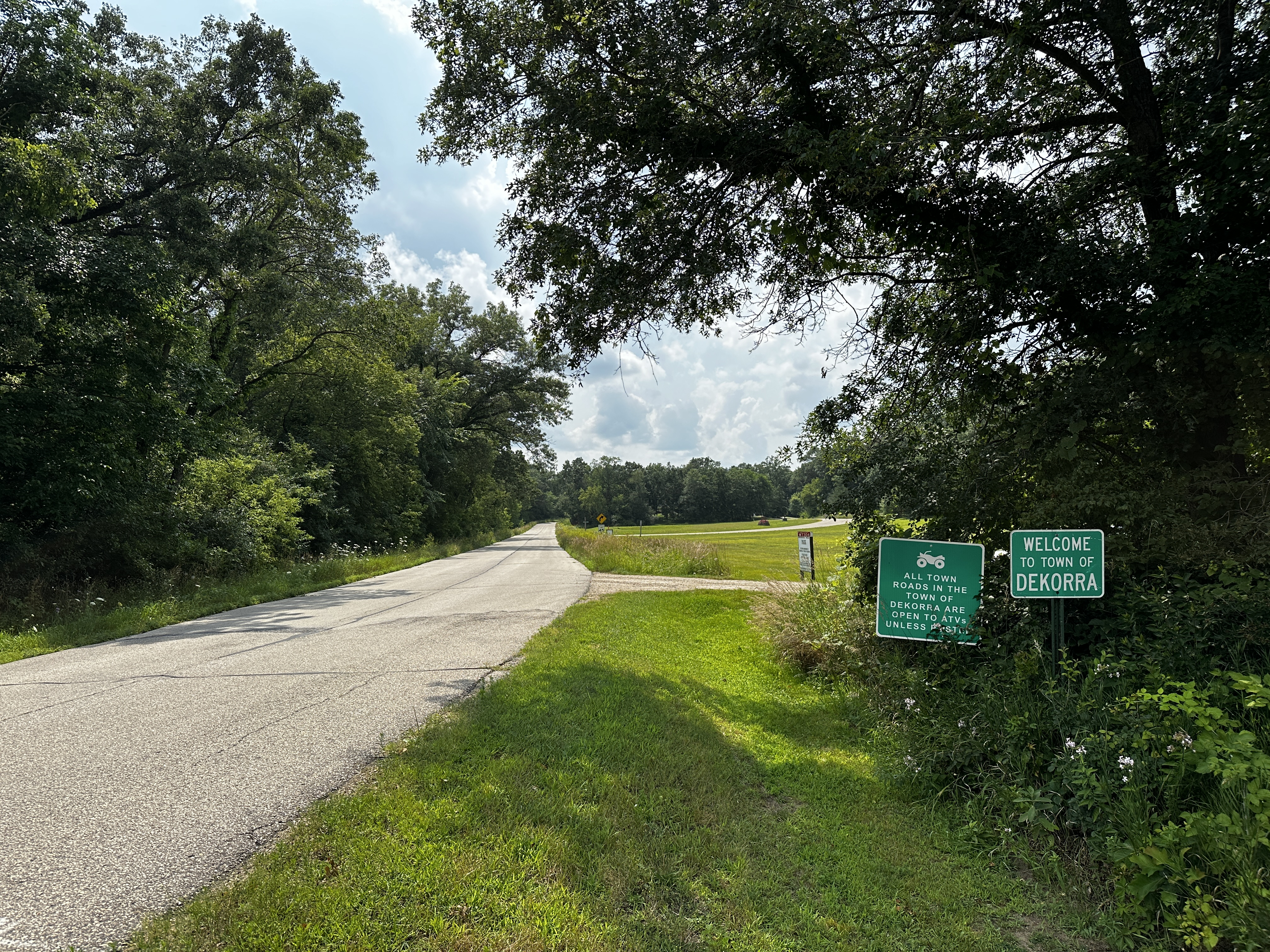
Dekorra pictured in July 2024

According to the United States Census Bureau, the town has a total area of 45 square miles (116.5 km^{2}), of which 41.1 square miles (106.6 km^{2}) is land and 3.8 square miles (10 km^{2}) (8.56%) is water.

== Demographics ==
As of the census of 2000, there were 2,350 people, 949 households, and 690 families residing in the town. The population density was 57.1 people per square mile (22.1/km^{2}). There were 1,237 housing units at an average density of 30.1 per square mile (11.6/km^{2}). The racial makeup of the town was 97.49% White, 0.04% African American, 0.85% Native American, 0.3% Asian, 0.3% from other races, and 1.02% from two or more races. Hispanic or Latino people of any race were 0.55% of the population.

There were 949 households, out of which 30% had children under the age of 18 living with them, 64.6% were married couples living together, 4.8% had a female householder with no husband present, and 27.2% were non-families. 21.9% of all households were made up of individuals, and 7.7% had someone living alone who was 65 years of age or older. The average household size was 2.48 and the average family size was 2.9.

In the town, the population was spread out, with 23.6% under the age of 18, 5.7% from 18 to 24, 29.9% from 25 to 44, 30.1% from 45 to 64, and 10.8% who were 65 years of age or older. The median age was 40 years. For every 100 females, there were 113.1 males. For every 100 females age 18 and over, there were 114.3 males.

The median income for a household in the town was $55,737, and the median income for a family was $63,583. Males had a median income of $38,782 versus $28,750 for females. The per capita income for the town was $25,319. About 1.6% of families and 2.1% of the population were below the poverty line, including 1.6% of those under age 18 and none of those age 65 or over.

== Education ==
Dekorra is part of the Poynette School District. The district has two elementary schools, one middle school, and Poynette High School.
