= Lodi (town), Wisconsin =

Lodi, Wisconsin
- Town
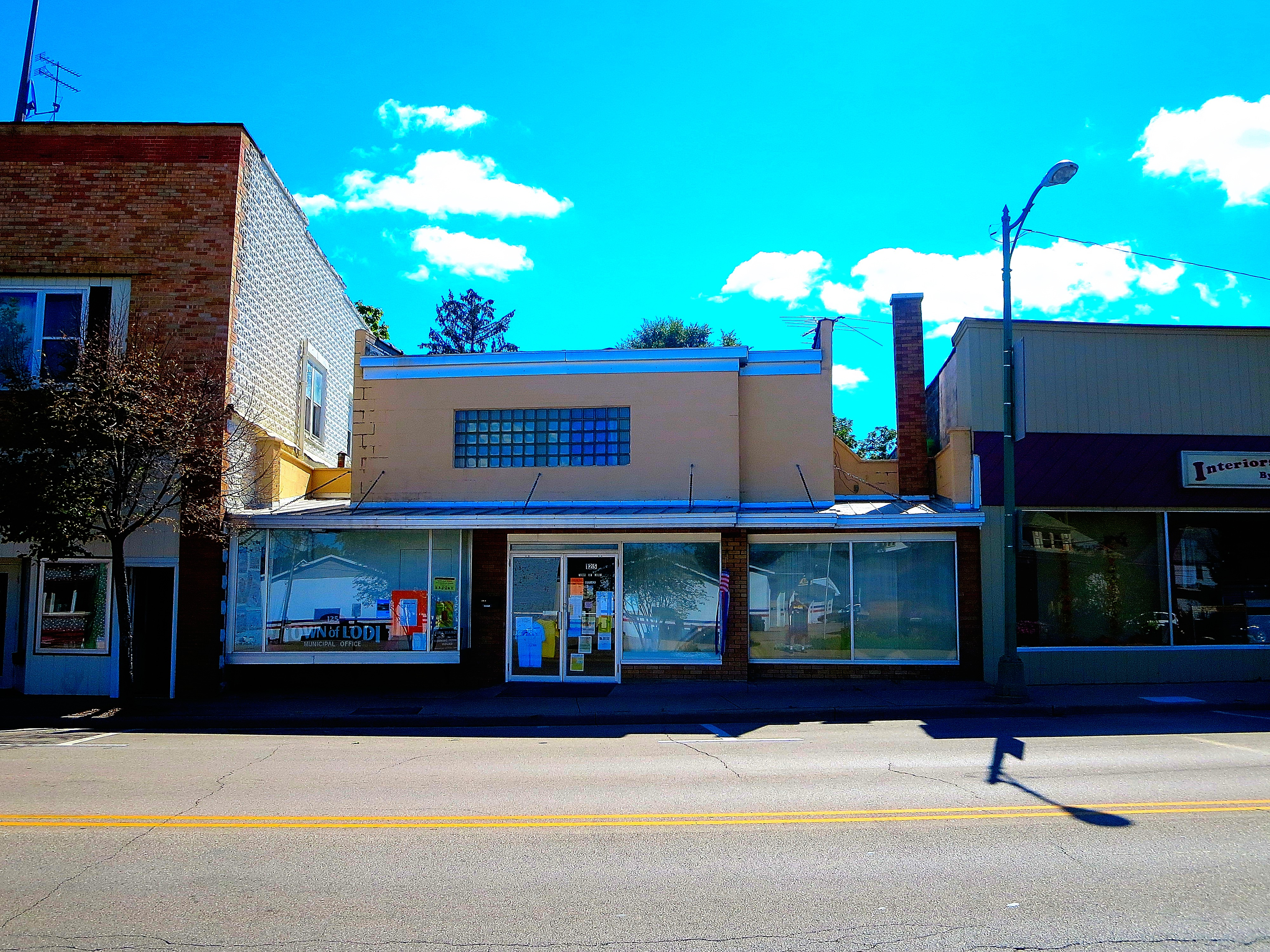
- Town hall

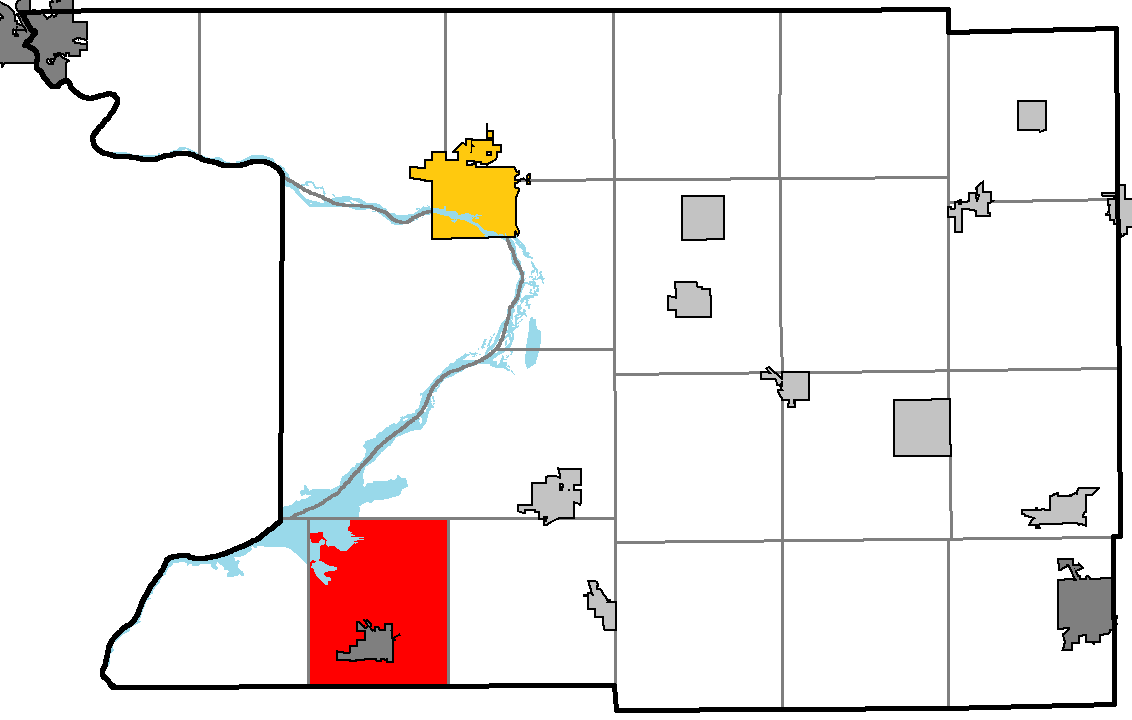
- Location of Lodi, within Columbia County, Wisconsin

- Location of Columbia County, Wisconsin
- Coordinates: 43°21′5″N 89°32′14″W
- Country: United States
- State: Wisconsin
- County: Columbia

Area
  - Total: 28.9 sq mi (74.8 km^{2})
  - Land: 27.1 sq mi (70.1 km^{2})
  - Water: 1.8 sq mi (4.7 km^{2})
- Elevation: 942 ft (287 m)

Population (2020)
  - Total: 3,282
  - Density: 103/sq mi (39.8/km^{2})
- Time zone: UTC-6 (Central (CST))
  - Summer (DST): UTC-5 (CDT)
- Area code: 608
- FIPS code: 55-45375
- GNIS feature ID: 1583590

Lodi is a town in Columbia County, Wisconsin, United States. The population was 3,282 at the 2020 census. The unincorporated communities of Harmony Grove and Okee are in the town and the census-designated place of Lake Wisconsin is partially in the town.

== Geography ==
According to the United States Census Bureau, the town has a total area of 28.9 square miles (75 km^{2}), of which 27.1 square miles (70 km^{2}) is land and 1.8 square miles (4.7 km^{2}) (6.27%) is water.

== Demographics ==
As of the census of 2000, there were 2882 people, 1,078 households, and 845 families residing in the town. The population density was 103.2 people per square mile (39.8 people/km^{2}). There were 1,285 housing units at an average density of 47.5 units per square mile (18.3 units/km^{2}). The racial makeup of the town was 98.71% White, 0.14% Black or African American, 0.5% Native American, 0.14% Asian, 0.04% Pacific Islander, and 0.47% from two or more races. 0.47% of the population were Hispanic or Latino of any race.

There were 1,078 households, out of which 33.8% had children under the age of 18 living with them, 70.7% were married couples living together, 4.5% had a female householder with no husband present, and 21.6% were non-families. 16.9% of all households were made up of individuals, and 6.4% had someone living alone who was 65 years of age or older. The average household size was 2.59 and the average family size was 2.92.

In the town, the population was spread out, with 24.6% under the age of 18, 5.8% from 18 to 24, 30.9% from 25 to 44, 27.8% from 45 to 64, and 10.8% who were 65 years of age or older. The median age was 38 years. For every 100 females, there were 106.3 males. For every 100 females age 18 and over, there were 104.7 males.

The median income for a household in the town was $56,250, and the median income for a family was $60,288. Males had a median income of $39,129 versus $28,203 for females. The per capita income for the town was $23,900. About 1.2% of families and 2.7% of the population were below the poverty line, including 3.3% of those under age 18 and 5.1% of those age 65 or over.
