= Francis Joseph Campbell =

British-American activist and educator (1832–1914)

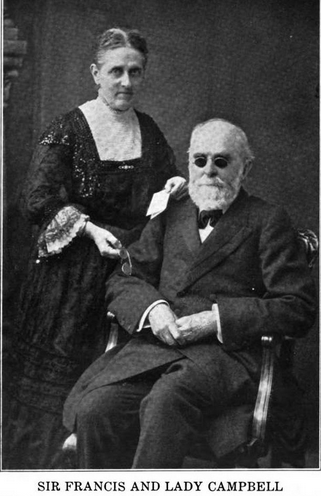
- Sir Francis Joseph Campbell and Lady Sarah Faulkner Campbell, from a 1921 publication.
- Born: October 9, 1832; Winchester, Tennessee
- Died: June 30, 1914 (aged 81)
- Occupation: Teacher

Sir Francis Joseph Campbell (October 9, 1832 – June 30, 1914) was a British-American anti-slavery campaigner, teacher, and also the co-founder of the Royal National College for the Blind in the United Kingdom.

== Early life and education ==
Campbell was born near Winchester, Tennessee, USA, and lost his sight in 1836 following an accident, several sources indicate due to thorns on a tree or bush. In 1844, he became a student at Tennessee Institution for the Instruction of the Blind (now called the Tennessee School for the Blind), the same year the school was founded by Reverend James Champlin.

== Career ==
Campbell was appointed teacher of music at the Tennessee School for the Blind in 1850. He later went on to become a music teacher and eventually the musical director at the Wisconsin School for the Blind. He also taught at the Perkins Institute for the Blind in Watertown, Massachusetts.

It was while he was teaching at Wisconsin that his anti-slavery views became publicly known and at one point he was given twenty four hours to renounce them or face being hanged. He refused but was spared death because of public sympathy for his blindness.

He would later become a frequent traveller between the United States and the United Kingdom and Europe, and in 1871 helped Thomas Armitage to establish The Royal Normal College and Academy for the Blind near Crystal Palace in London. It was during a visit to London after studying in Berlin that he called on Dr. Armitage with a letter of introduction and was invited to dinner. Over dinner, Campbell told his host about his plans to establish a training college for the blind in the United States, but Armitage urged him to make London its home. The college was founded with two students, and Campbell was its first principal. The college continues to the present day, and is now known as the Royal National College for the Blind.

Campbell was also the first blind person to climb Mont Blanc. In his later years he became a naturalised Briton and in 1909 was knighted as a Knight Bachelor by King Edward VII. He retired as principal of RNC in 1912 and was succeeded by his son, Guy Marshall Campbell.

== Legacy ==
The Francis Joseph Campbell Award is an annual award given by the American Library Association for any person who has made an outstanding contribution to the advancement of library services for the blind. It consists of a citation and a medal.
