= Otsego, Wisconsin =

Otsego
- Town
- Town of Otsego
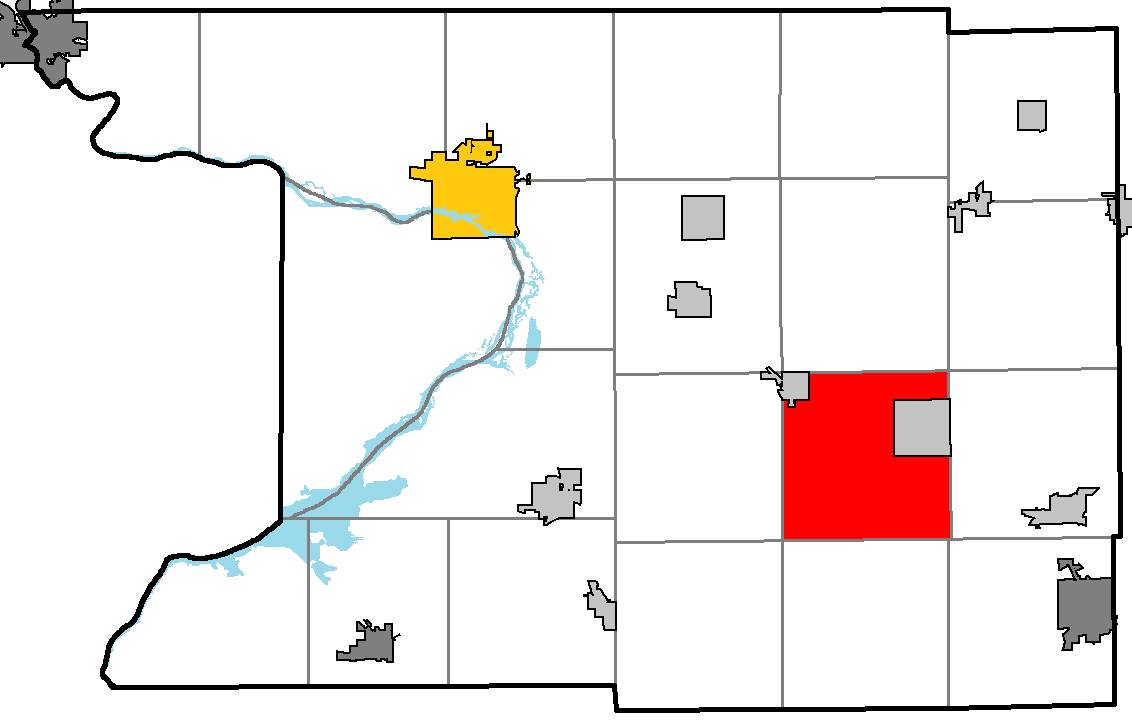
- Location of Otsego, in Columbia County, Wisconsin

- Location of Columbia County, Wisconsin
- Coordinates: 43°23′58″N 89°10′44″W
- Country: United States
- State: Wisconsin
- County: Columbia

Area
  - Total: 31.0 sq mi (80.2 km^{2})
  - Land: 31 sq mi (79 km^{2})
  - Water: 0.46 sq mi (1.2 km^{2})
- Elevation: 961 ft (293 m)

Population (2020)
  - Total: 670
  - Density: 22/sq mi (8.5/km^{2})
- Time zone: UTC-6 (Central (CST))
  - Summer (DST): UTC-5 (CDT)
- FIPS code: 55-60687
- GNIS feature ID: 1583879

Otsego is a town in Columbia County, Wisconsin, United States. The population was 670 at the 2020 census. The unincorporated community of Otsego is located in the town. The villages of Rio and Doylestown lie in the geographic area of the town of Otsego.

== Geography ==
According to the United States Census Bureau, the town has a total area of 31 square miles (80.2 km^{2}), of which 30.5 square miles (79 km^{2}) is land and 0.5 square mile (1.2 km^{2}) (1.49%) is water.

== Demographics ==
As of the census of 2000, there were 757 people, 272 households, and 212 families residing in the town. The population density was 24.8 people per square mile (9.6/km^{2}). There were 287 housing units at an average density of 9.4 per square mile (3.6/km^{2}). The racial makeup of the town was 97.89% White, 0.13% African American, 0.53% Native American, 0.92% Asian, 0.26% from other races, and 0.26% from two or more races. Hispanic or Latino people of any race were 0.92% of the population.

There were 272 households, out of which 36% had children under the age of 18 living with them, 68% were married couples living together, 5.5% had a female householder with no husband present, and 21.7% were non-families. 18% of all households were made up of individuals, and 7.4% had someone living alone who was 65 years of age or older. The average household size was 2.78 and the average family size was 3.14.

In the town, the population was spread out, with 26.7% under the age of 18, 7.4% from 18 to 24, 29.6% from 25 to 44, 25.6% from 45 to 64, and 10.7% who were 65 years of age or older. The median age was 37 years. For every 100 females, there were 98.2 males. For every 100 females age 18 and over, there were 93.4 males.

The median income for a household in the town was $52,500, and the median income for a family was $55,125. Males had a median income of $33,875 versus $29,327 for females. The per capita income for the town was $20,620. About 1.4% of families and 3.6% of the population were below the poverty line, including 4.7% of those under age 18 and 1.1% of those age 65 or over.
