= Wyocena (town), Wisconsin =

Wyocena, Wisconsin
- Town
- Town of Wyocena
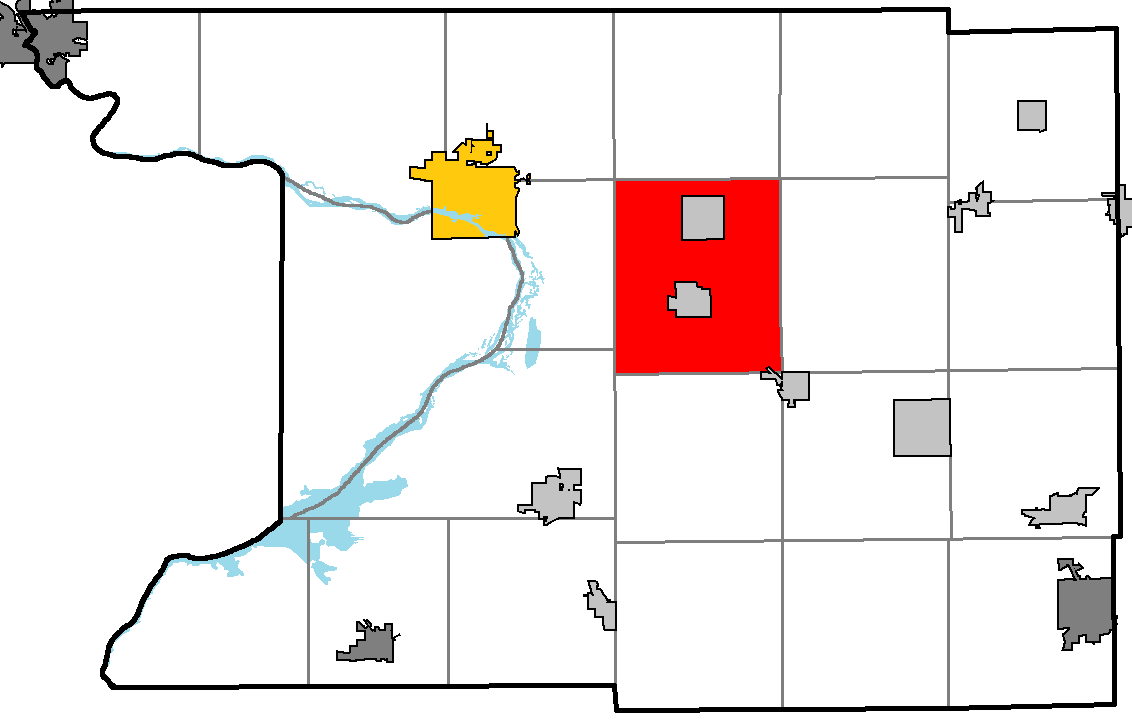
- Location of Wyocena, within Columbia County, Wisconsin

- Location of Columbia County, Wisconsin
- Coordinates: 43°30′14″N 89°17′32″W
- Country: United States
- State: Wisconsin
- County: Columbia

Area
  - Total: 37.09 sq mi (96.1 km^{2})
  - Land: 35.74 sq mi (92.6 km^{2})
  - Water: 1.35 sq mi (3.5 km^{2})

Population (2020)
  - Total: 1,756
  - Density: 49.13/sq mi (18.97/km^{2})
- Time zone: UTC-6 (Central (CST))
  - Summer (DST): UTC-5 (CDT)
- Area code(s): 608 and 353
- GNIS feature ID: 1584489
- Website: https://townofwyocena.com/

Wyocena is a town in Columbia County, Wisconsin, United States. The population was 1,756 at the 2020 Census. The Village of Wyocena is located within the town.

== Geography ==
According to the United States Census Bureau, the town has a total area of 37 square miles (96 km^{2}), of which 36.2 square miles (93.8 km^{2}) is land and 0.8 square miles (2.1 km^{2}) (2.21%) is water.

== Demographics ==
As of the census of 2000, there were 1,543 people, 614 households, and 480 families residing in the town. The population density was 42.6 people per square mile (16.4/km^{2}). There were 714 housing units at an average density of 19.7 per square mile (7.6/km^{2}). The racial makeup of the town was 98.44% White, 0.39% Black or African American, 0.13% Native American, 0.13% Pacific Islander, 0.32% from other races, and 0.58% from two or more races. 0.91% of the population were Hispanic or Latino of any race.

There were 614 households, out of which 29.8% had children under the age of 18 living with them, 68.6% were married couples living together, 5.4% had a female householder with no husband present, and 21.8% were non-families. 18.6% of all households were made up of individuals, and 7.7% had someone living alone who was 65 years of age or older. The average household size was 2.51 and the average family size was 2.82.

In the town, the population was spread out, with 23.3% under the age of 18, 5.4% from 18 to 24, 26.9% from 25 to 44, 28.8% from 45 to 64, and 15.6% who were 65 years of age or older. The median age was 42 years. For every 100 females, there were 102.5 males. For every 100 females age 18 and over, there were 103.6 males.

The median income for a household in the town was $45,150, and the median income for a family was $49,792. Males had a median income of $37,619 versus $23,945 for females. The per capita income for the town was $23,424. About 1.2% of families and 3.1% of the population were below the poverty line, including 3.2% of those under age 18 and 2% of those age 65 or over.

== Notable people ==
- Hiram W. Roblier (1823–1897), farmer, businessman, and Wisconsin State Representative; served as chairman of the Wyocena Town Board
