= Helen Thomas Dranga =

British-American painter

Caroline Helen Thomas Dranga
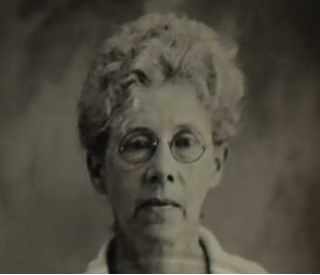
- Helen T. Dranga, 1922
- Born: Caroline Helen Thomas; December 28, 1866; Oxford, England
- Died: 1927; Hawaii
- Resting place: San Diego
- Education: Kensington Art Academy (Royal College of Art)
- Known for: Painting
- Movement: Hawaiian landscapes
- Spouse: Theodore T. Dranga

Helen Thomas Dranga (1866–1927), who is also known as Carrie Helen Dranga, was a British/American painter who made paintings of Hawaii.

== Personal life ==
Born Caroline Helen Thomas (Note: Her name surname is given in a few places as "Tufts" but her name is generally recorded as "Carrie Helen Thomas Dranga" or "Helen Thomas Dranga", never Carrie Helen/Helen Tufts Dranga. Further, her son was named Theodore Thomas Dranga, not Theodore Tufts Dranga (considering an option that she was born with the surname Tufts and had a first marriage to a man surnamed Thomas.)) in Oxford, England on December 28, 1866. The daughter of Mary Ann Webb and Robert Thomas, a plumber, painter and decorator. She studied art at the Kensington Art Academy (Royal College of Art).

She came to the United States in 1892 and on December 16, 1895 she married Theodore Dranga, a merchant who was born in Wisconsin in 1867 to parents who had immigrated from Norway. She lived in Oakland, California from 1894 until 1900, when she moved to Hawaii and in 1901 settled in Hilo, Hawaii. The Drangas had two children, Theodore Thomas born in 1901 and an adopted daughter, Mary born about 1902. Both children were born in Hawaii.

In 1927 she lived in Honolulu and worked there as an artist.

== Career ==
She painted the Hawaiian landscape with a "remarkably sensitive touch". She also painted portraits and skyscrapers. Her paintings regularly appeared on the cover of Paradise of the Pacific magazine in the 1920s and 1930s, such as the Golden Shower Tree published in a 1927 edition. She lived in Hilo and then moved in the 1920s to Honolulu, where she died on January 3, 1927.

The Hawaii State Art Museum, the Honolulu Museum of Art and the Lyman House Memorial Museum (Hilo, Hawaii) are among the public collections holding works by Helen Thomas Dranga. Her works were included in Encounters with paradise: views of Hawaii and its people, 1778-1941 in 1992. Her paintings were said to "seem to reflect the romantic view of Hawaii" at a show at the Hawaii State Art Museum in 2014 of early 20th century paintings of Hawaii.

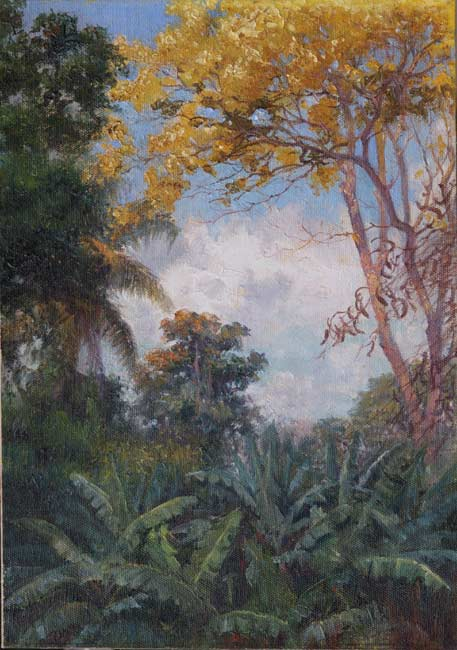
View from Makiki, oil on board

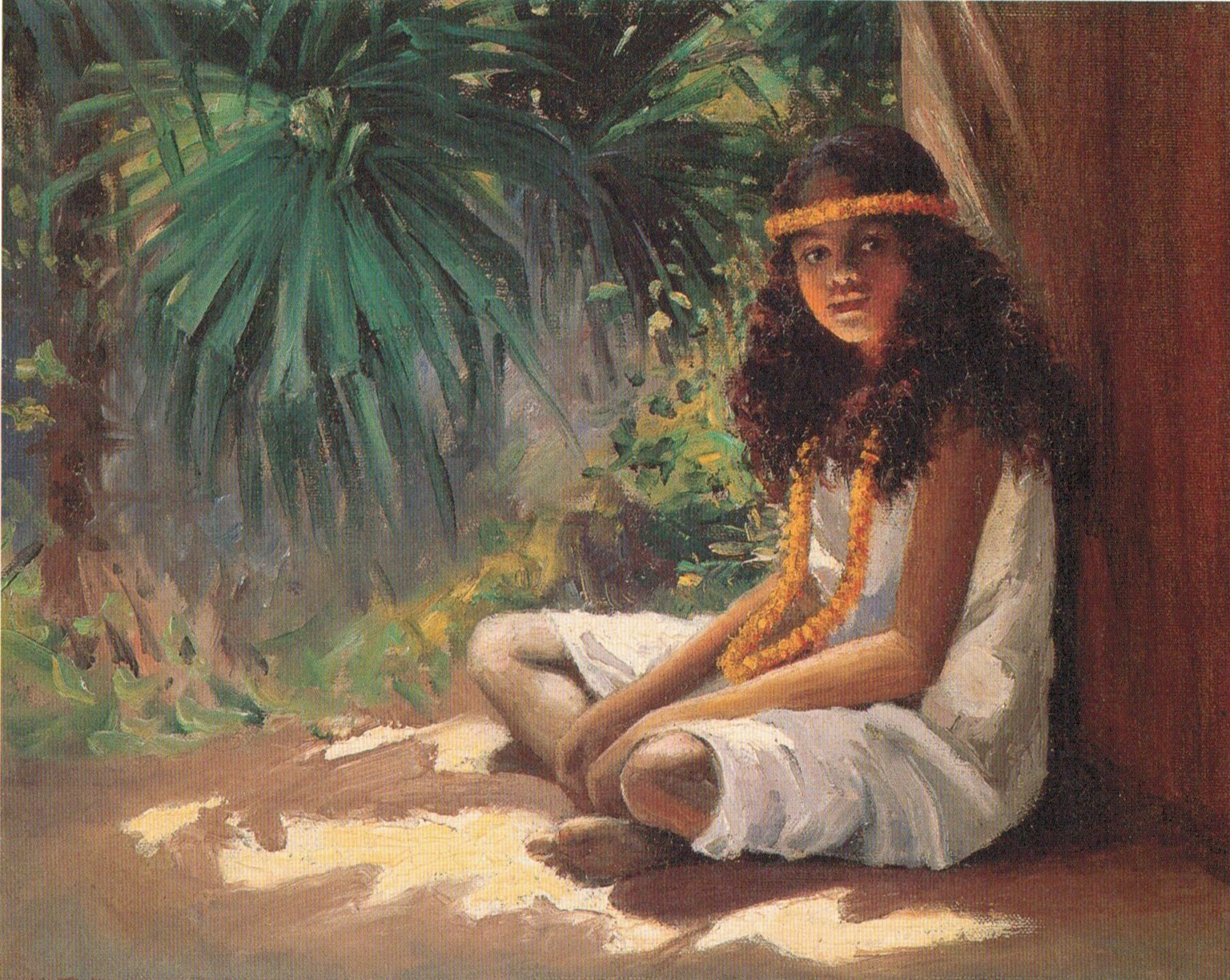
Portrait of a Polynesian Girl, oil on canvas painting by Helen Thomas Dranga, c. 1910

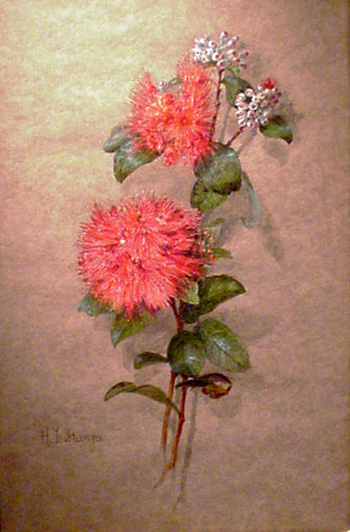
Ohia Lehua Blossoms, undated, gouache
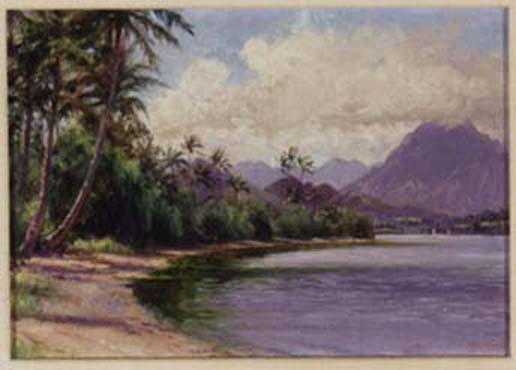
Kaneohe Bay, Oahu. oil on board

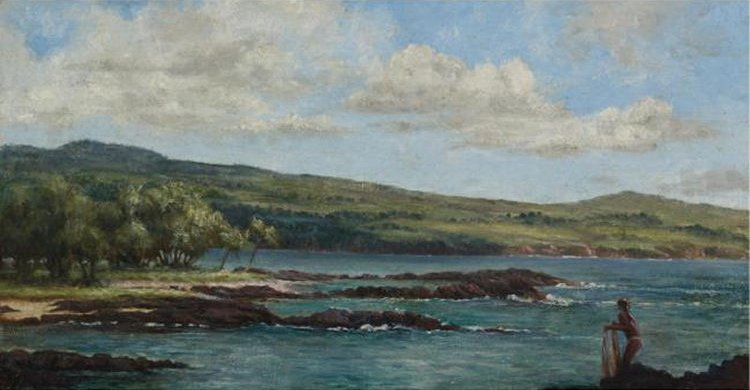
Casting a Net, oil on canvas

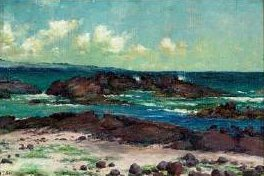
Scene from Hilo Looking Toward Hamakua Coast, oil on canvas
