= Columbia County, Wisconsin =

County in Wisconsin, United States

- County
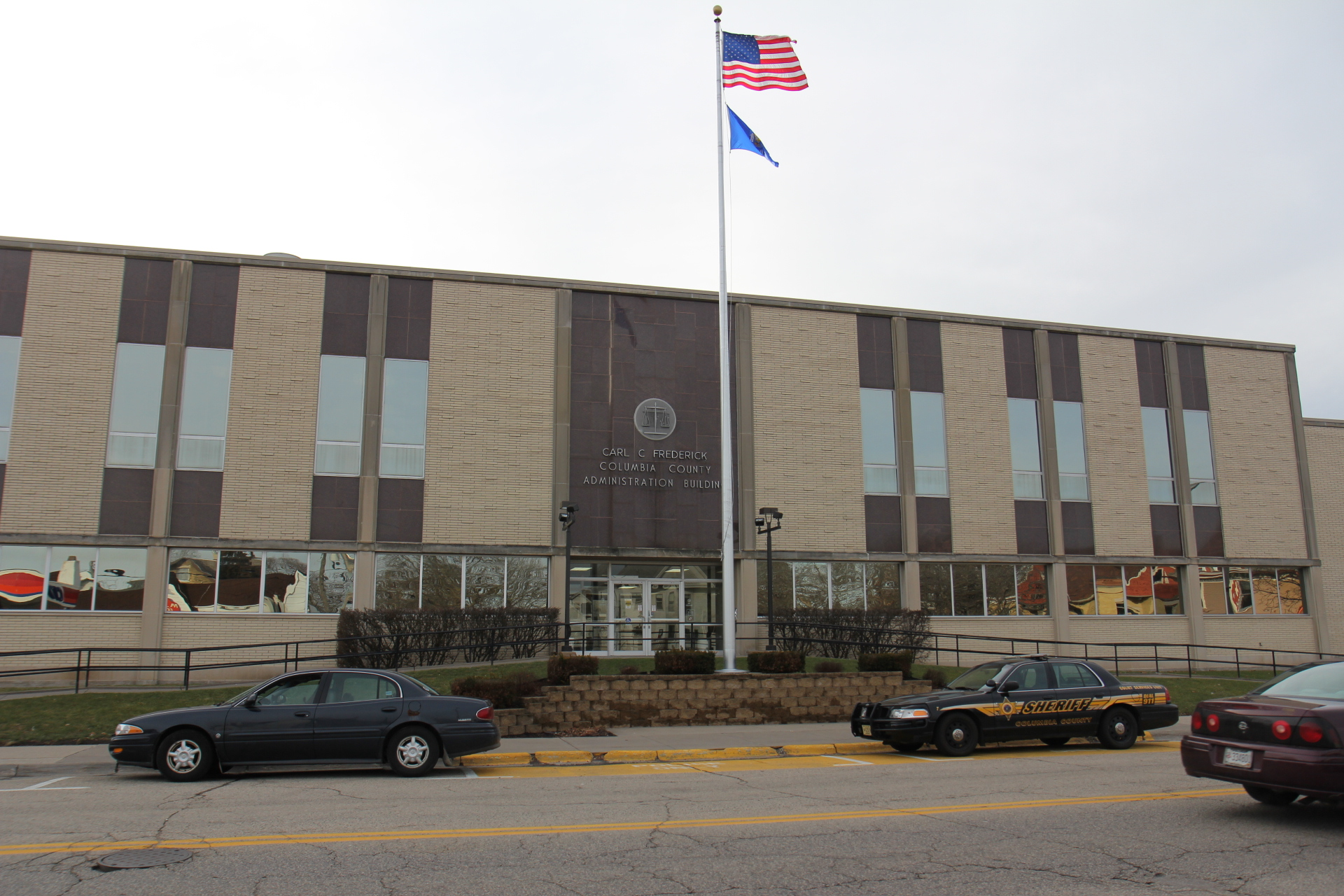
- Columbia County Courthouse in December 2014

- Location within the U.S. state of Wisconsin
- Coordinates: 43°28′N 89°20′W
- Country: United States
- State: Wisconsin
- Founded: 1846
- Named for: Columbia
- Seat: Portage
- Largest city: Portage

Area
  - Total: 796 sq mi (2,060 km^{2})
  - Land: 766 sq mi (1,980 km^{2})
  - Water: 30 sq mi (78 km^{2}) 3.8%

Population (2020)
  - Total: 58,490
  - Estimate (2025): 58,132 ▼
  - Density: 76.4/sq mi (29.5/km^{2})
- Time zone: UTC−6 (Central)
  - Summer (DST): UTC−5 (CDT)
- Congressional district: 6th
- Website: www.co.columbia.wi.us

Columbia County is a county located in the U.S. state of Wisconsin. As of the 2020 census, the population was 58,490. Its county seat and largest city is Portage. The county was created in 1846 as part of Wisconsin Territory. Columbia County is part of the Madison, WI Metropolitan Statistical Area as well as the Madison-Janesville-Beloit, WI Combined Statistical Area.

== Geography ==
According to the U.S. Census Bureau, the county has a total area of 796 square miles (2,060 km^{2}), of which 766 square miles (1,980 km^{2}) is land and 30 square miles (78 km^{2}) (3.8%) is water. The county's highest point is in the Baraboo Range, near Durward's Glen at 1,480 feet above sea level.

=== Major highways ===
- Interstate 39
- Interstate 90
- Interstate 94
- U.S. Highway 51
- U.S. Highway 151
- Highway 13
- Highway 16
- Highway 22
- Highway 23
- Highway 33
- Highway 44
- Highway 60
- Highway 73
- Highway 78
- Highway 89
- Highway 113
- Highway 127
- Highway 146
- Highway 188

=== Railroads ===
Passenger

- Amtrak

Freight

- Wisconsin and Southern Railroad
- Canadian Pacific
- Union Pacific
- Columbus station
- Portage station
- Wisconsin Dells station

=== Airports ===
- 94C - Gilbert Field airport serves the county and surrounding communities.
- C47 - Portage Municipal Airport supports the county.

=== Adjacent counties ===
- Marquette County – north
- Green Lake County – northeast
- Dodge County – east
- Dane County – south
- Sauk County – west
- Juneau County – northwest
- Adams County – northwest

== Demographics ==
Historical population
Census	Pop.	Note	%±
1850	9,565		—
1860	24,441		155.5%
1870	28,802		17.8%
1880	28,065		−2.6%
1890	28,350		1.0%
1900	31,121		9.8%
1910	31,129		0.0%
1920	30,468		−2.1%
1930	30,503		0.1%
1940	32,517		6.6%
1950	34,023		4.6%
1960	36,708		7.9%
1970	40,150		9.4%
1980	43,222		7.7%
1990	45,088		4.3%
2000	52,468		16.4%
2010	56,833		8.3%
2020	58,490		2.9%
2025 (est.)	58,132	▼	−0.6%
U.S. Decennial Census; 1790–1960 1900–1990; 1990–2000 2010–2020

=== Racial and ethnic composition ===
Columbia County, Wisconsin – Racial and ethnic composition Note: the US Census treats Hispanic/Latino as an ethnic category. This table excludes Latinos from the racial categories and assigns them to a separate category. Hispanics/Latinos may be of any race.
Race / Ethnicity (NH = Non-Hispanic)	Pop 1980	Pop 1990	Pop 2000	Pop 2010	Pop 2020	% 1980	% 1990	% 2000	% 2010	% 2020
White alone (NH)	42,755	44,234	50,476	53,628	53,037	98.92%	98.11%	96.20%	94.36%	90.68%
Black or African American alone (NH)	29	233	432	697	866	0.07%	0.52%	0.82%	1.23%	1.48%
Native American or Alaska Native alone (NH)	106	134	165	233	270	0.25%	0.30%	0.31%	0.41%	0.46%
Asian alone (NH)	83	126	173	298	376	0.19%	0.28%	0.33%	0.52%	0.64%
Native Hawaiian or Pacific Islander alone (NH)	x	x	12	24	11	x	x	0.02%	0.04%	0.02%
Other race alone (NH)	33	3	29	15	122	0.08%	0.01%	0.06%	0.03%	0.21%
Mixed race or Multiracial (NH)	x	x	354	494	1,669	x	x	0.67%	0.87%	2.85%
Hispanic or Latino (any race)	216	358	827	1,444	2,139	0.50%	0.79%	1.58%	2.54%	3.66%
Total	43,222	45,088	52,468	56,833	58,490	100.00%	100.00%	100.00%	100.00%	100.00%

=== 2020 census ===
As of the 2020 census, the population was 58,490. The population density was 76.4 people per square mile (29.5 people/km^{2}). There were 26,565 housing units at an average density of 34.7 units per square mile (13.4 units/km^{2}).

The median age was 43.2 years. 21.1% of residents were under the age of 18 and 19.4% of residents were 65 years of age or older. For every 100 females there were 103.5 males, and for every 100 females age 18 and over there were 102.9 males age 18 and over.

The racial makeup of the county was 91.9% White, 1.5% Black or African American, 0.5% American Indian and Alaska Native, 0.7% Asian, <0.1% Native Hawaiian and Pacific Islander, 1.3% from some other race, and 4.1% from two or more races. Hispanic or Latino residents of any race comprised 3.7% of the population.

33.8% of residents lived in urban areas, while 66.2% lived in rural areas.

There were 23,879 households in the county, of which 27.4% had children under the age of 18 living in them. Of all households, 51.5% were married-couple households, 18.9% were households with a male householder and no spouse or partner present, and 21.2% were households with a female householder and no spouse or partner present. About 27.6% of all households were made up of individuals and 12.1% had someone living alone who was 65 years of age or older.

There were 26,565 housing units, of which 10.1% were vacant. Among occupied housing units, 74.6% were owner-occupied and 25.4% were renter-occupied. The homeowner vacancy rate was 1.1% and the rental vacancy rate was 5.4%.

=== 2000 census ===
2000 Census Age Pyramid for Columbia County

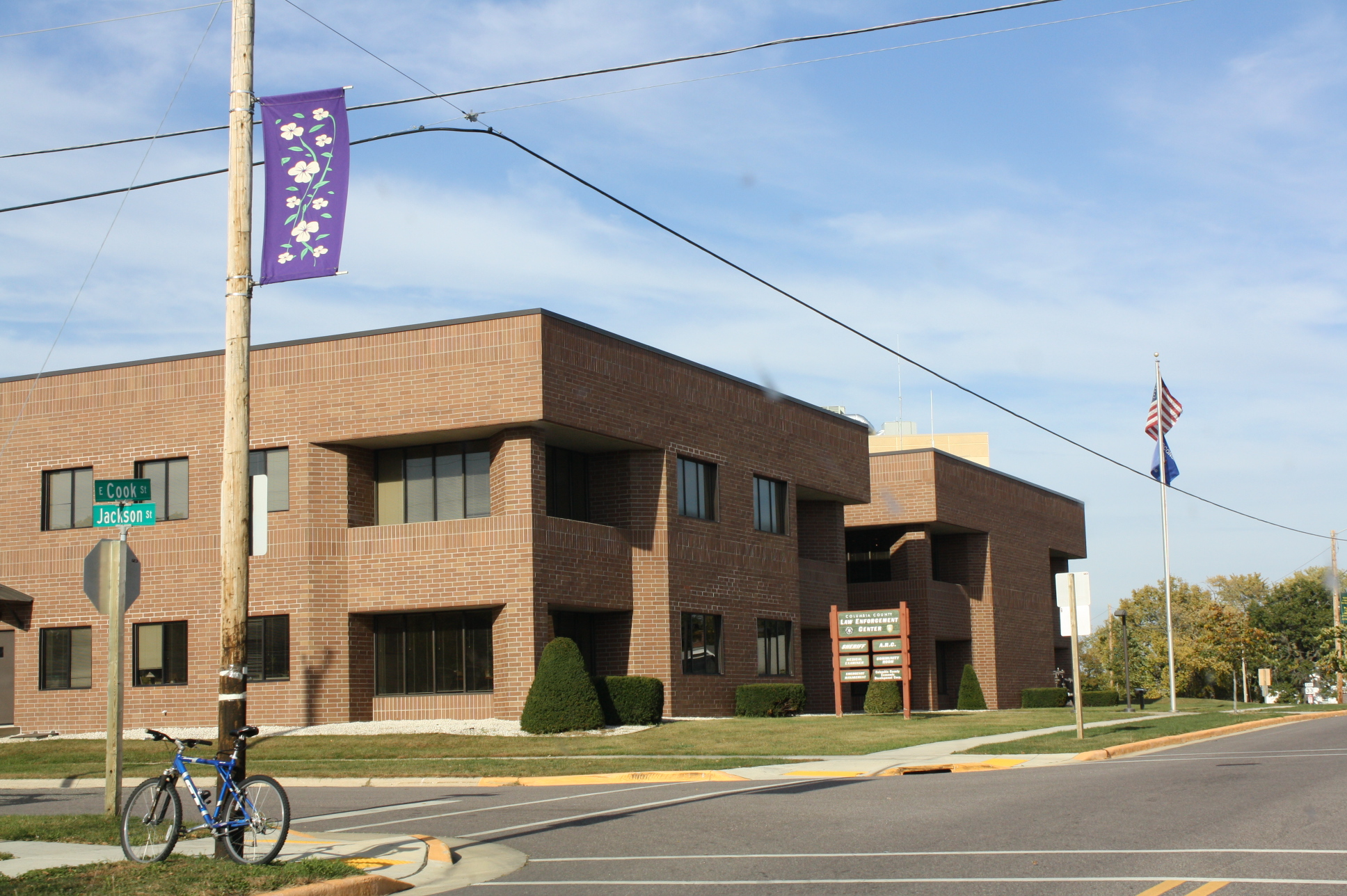
Columbia County Law Enforcement Center

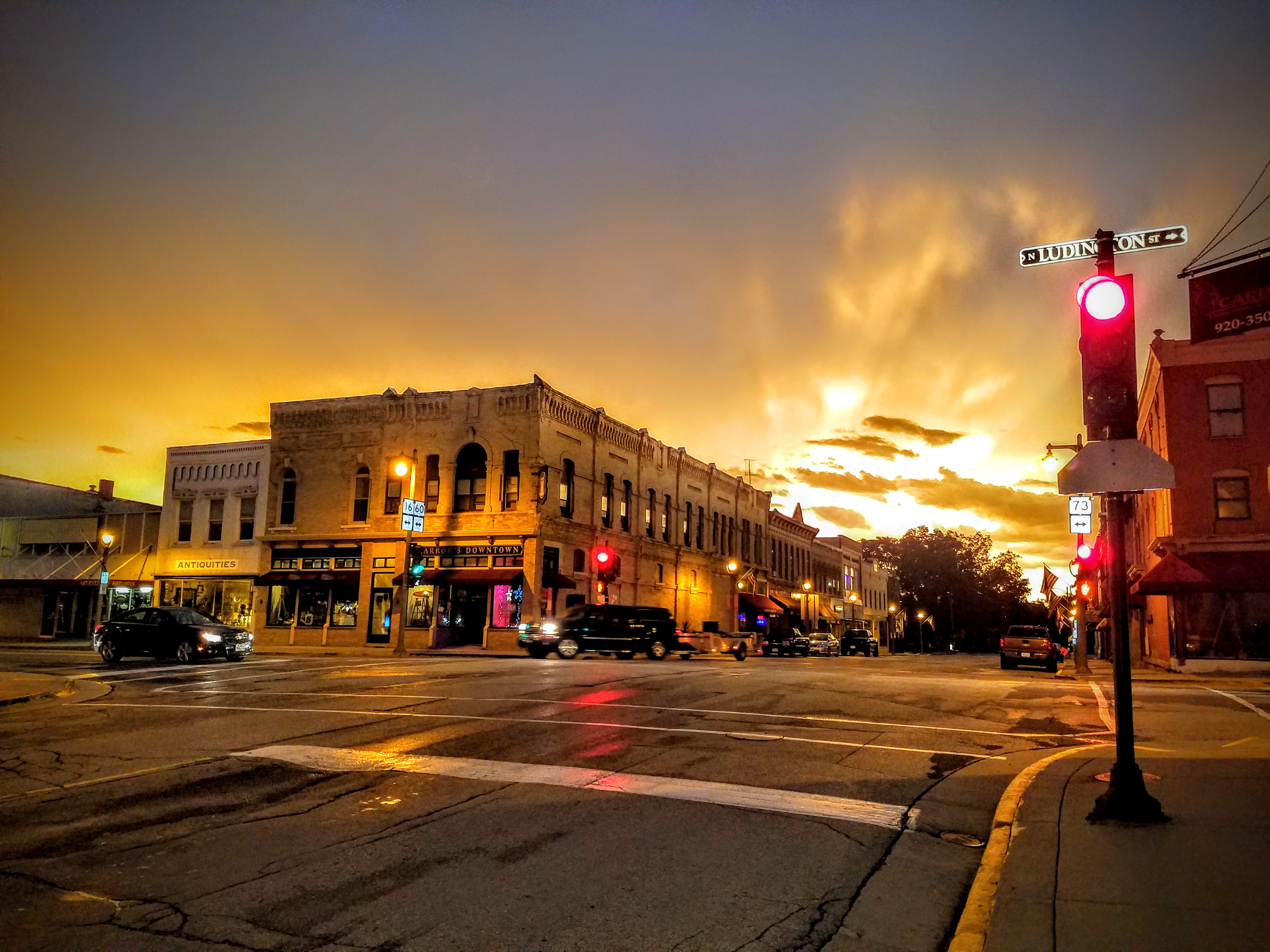
Columbus, Wisconsin

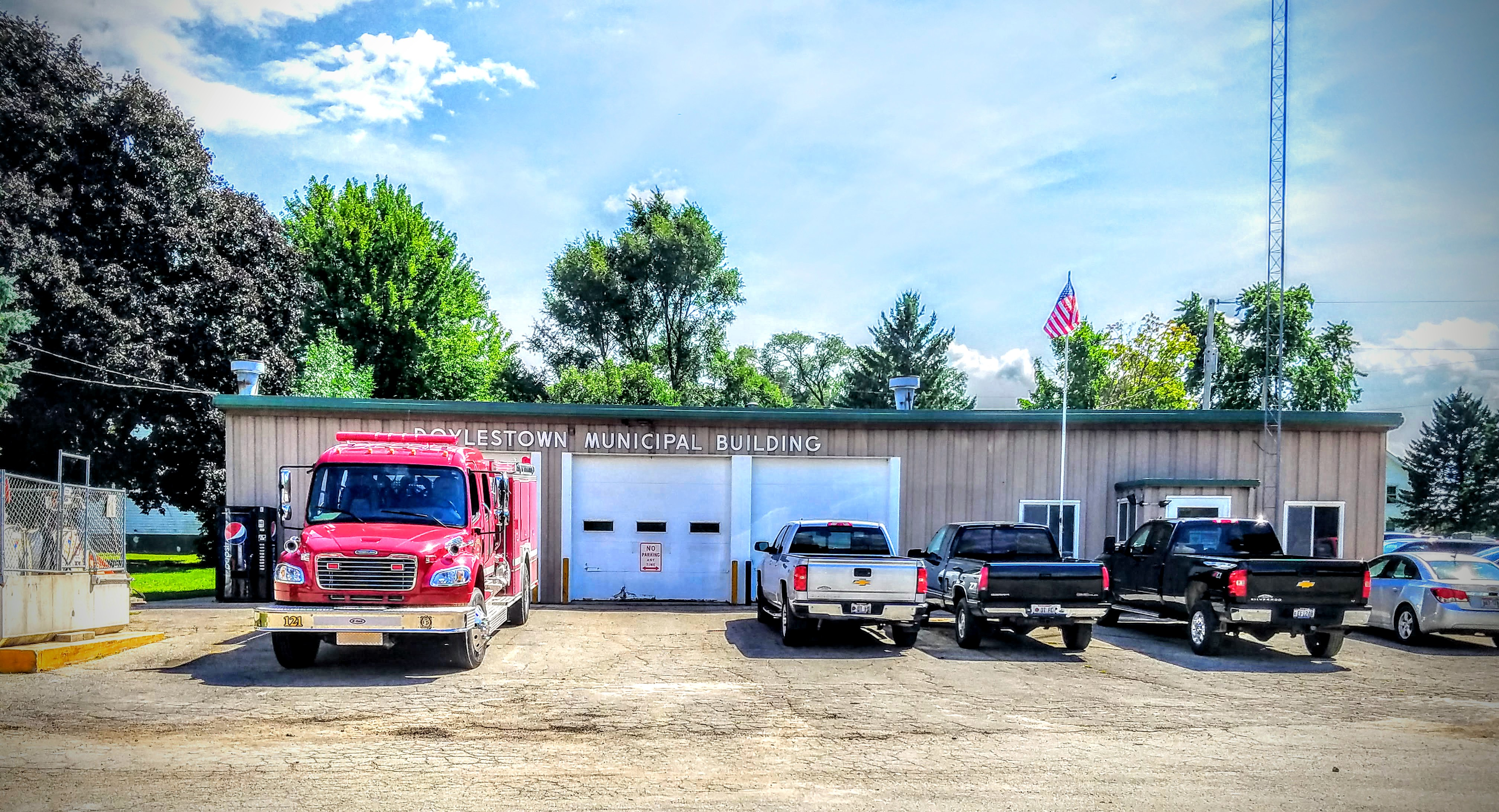
Doylestown Wisconsin Municipal Building

As of the census of 2000, there were 52,468 people, 20,439 households, and 14,164 families residing in the county. The population density was 68 people per square mile (26 people/km^{2}). There were 22,685 housing units at an average density of 29 units per square mile (11 units/km^{2}). The racial makeup of the county was 97.18% White, 0.88% Black or African American, 0.35% Native American, 0.33% Asian, 0.02% Pacific Islander, 0.44% from other races, and 0.79% from two or more races. 1.58% of the population were Hispanic or Latino of any race. 46.4% were of German, 10.2% Norwegian, 7.8% Irish, 6.4% English and 5.0% United States or American ancestry.

There were 20,439 households, out of which 32.20% had children under the age of 18 living with them, 58.10% were married couples living together, 7.40% had a female householder with no husband present, and 30.70% were non-families. 25.50% of all households were made up of individuals, and 11.00% had someone living alone who was 65 years of age or older. The average household size was 2.49 and the average family size was 2.99.

In the county, the population was spread out, with 25.20% under the age of 18, 7.10% from 18 to 24, 29.90% from 25 to 44, 23.40% from 45 to 64, and 14.40% who were 65 years of age or older. The median age was 38 years. For every 100 females, there were 101.60 males. For every 100 females age 18 and over, there were 100.40 males.

In 2017, there were 602 births, giving a general fertility rate of 63.9 births per 1000 women aged 15–44, the 35th highest out of all 72 Wisconsin Counties. Additionally, there were 63 reported induced abortions performed on women of Columbia County residence, with a rate of 6.7 abortions per 1000 women aged 15–44, which is above the Wisconsin average rate of 5.2.

== Communities ==
=== Cities ===
- Columbus (partly in Dodge County)
- Lodi
- Portage (county seat)
- Wisconsin Dells (partly in Adams County, Juneau County, and Sauk County)

=== Villages ===
- Arlington
- Cambria
- Doylestown
- Fall River
- Friesland
- Pardeeville
- Poynette
- Randolph (mostly in Dodge County)
- Rio
- Wyocena

=== Towns ===
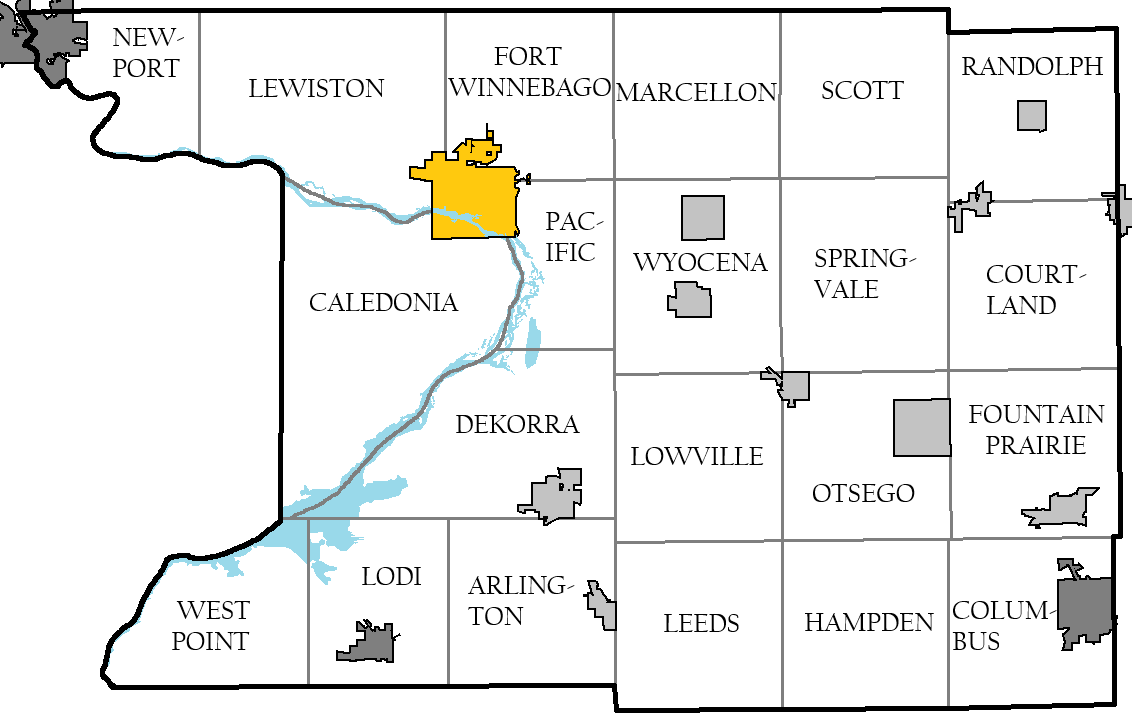
Map of the towns of Columbia County

- Arlington
- Caledonia
- Columbus
- Courtland
- Dekorra
- Fort Winnebago
- Fountain Prairie
- Hampden
- Leeds
- Lewiston
- Lodi
- Lowville
- Marcellon
- Newport
- Otsego
- Pacific
- Randolph
- Scott
- Springvale
- West Point
- Wyocena

=== Census-designated places ===
- Dekorra
- Lake Wisconsin (partial)

=== Unincorporated communities ===
- Anacker
- Belle Fountain
- Durwards Glen
- East Friesland
- Englewood
- Harmony Grove
- Ingle
- Keyeser
- Leeds
- Leeds Center
- Lewiston
- Lowville
- Marcellon
- North Leeds
- Okee
- Otsego

=== Ghost town/neighborhood ===
- Moe Settlement

== Politics ==
United States presidential election results for Columbia County, Wisconsin
Year	Republican		Democratic		Third party(ies)	
Year	No.	%	No.	%	No.	%
1892	3,314	49.26%	2,957	43.95%	457	6.79%
1896	4,845	63.57%	2,380	31.23%	397	5.21%
1900	4,763	65.71%	2,181	30.09%	305	4.21%
1904	4,730	67.53%	1,907	27.23%	367	5.24%
1908	4,072	60.12%	2,363	34.89%	338	4.99%
1912	2,463	42.55%	2,473	42.73%	852	14.72%
1916	3,395	57.52%	2,299	38.95%	208	3.52%
1920	7,394	83.25%	1,201	13.52%	287	3.23%
1924	4,724	40.41%	907	7.76%	6,059	51.83%
1928	7,615	60.70%	4,819	38.41%	111	0.88%
1932	4,970	36.43%	8,455	61.98%	216	1.58%
1936	5,607	37.25%	8,936	59.36%	511	3.39%
1940	8,260	53.68%	7,021	45.63%	106	0.69%
1944	7,867	56.50%	5,997	43.07%	60	0.43%
1948	6,406	52.64%	5,615	46.14%	148	1.22%
1952	11,133	67.78%	5,272	32.10%	20	0.12%
1956	10,120	66.01%	5,158	33.65%	52	0.34%
1960	10,282	60.94%	6,576	38.97%	15	0.09%
1964	6,253	38.20%	10,093	61.66%	24	0.15%
1968	8,633	52.60%	6,698	40.81%	1,083	6.60%
1972	10,122	58.02%	7,083	40.60%	242	1.39%
1976	10,075	50.63%	9,457	47.52%	368	1.85%
1980	10,478	49.90%	8,715	41.51%	1,803	8.59%
1984	11,662	58.52%	8,125	40.77%	140	0.70%
1988	10,475	53.09%	9,132	46.28%	123	0.62%
1992	9,099	37.94%	9,348	38.98%	5,537	23.09%
1996	8,377	38.92%	10,336	48.03%	2,808	13.05%
2000	11,987	46.85%	12,636	49.38%	964	3.77%
2004	14,956	50.60%	14,300	48.38%	299	1.01%
2008	12,193	41.65%	16,661	56.92%	418	1.43%
2012	13,026	42.64%	17,175	56.23%	345	1.13%
2016	14,163	47.69%	13,528	45.55%	2,007	6.76%
2020	16,927	49.98%	16,410	48.45%	532	1.57%
2024	17,988	51.52%	16,388	46.94%	538	1.54%

For most of its history, Columbia County voters have backed the Republican Party candidate in national elections. Prior to 1992, the only times Republicans failed to win the county in the preceding 100 years of presidential elections were in the midst of a divided party vote in 1912, in 1924 when Wisconsinite Robert La Follette was on the ballot, and in the national Democratic Party landslides of 1932, 1936, & 1964. From 1992 onward, the county has been a swing county, voting for the statewide winner in all presidential elections since then except in 2004 and 2020, and voting for the national winner in all except 2000 and 2020. Republican Donald Trump won narrow pluralities in the county in 2016 and 2020, although a majority of county residents supported Democrat Tammy Baldwin's re-election to the United States Senate in 2018. Trump went on to win an absolute majority in the county in 2024, the strongest Republican performance since 1988.

== See also ==
- National Register of Historic Places listings in Columbia County, Wisconsin
- List of counties in Wisconsin
