= Crown Point (Sierra Nevada) =

Mountain in the American state of California

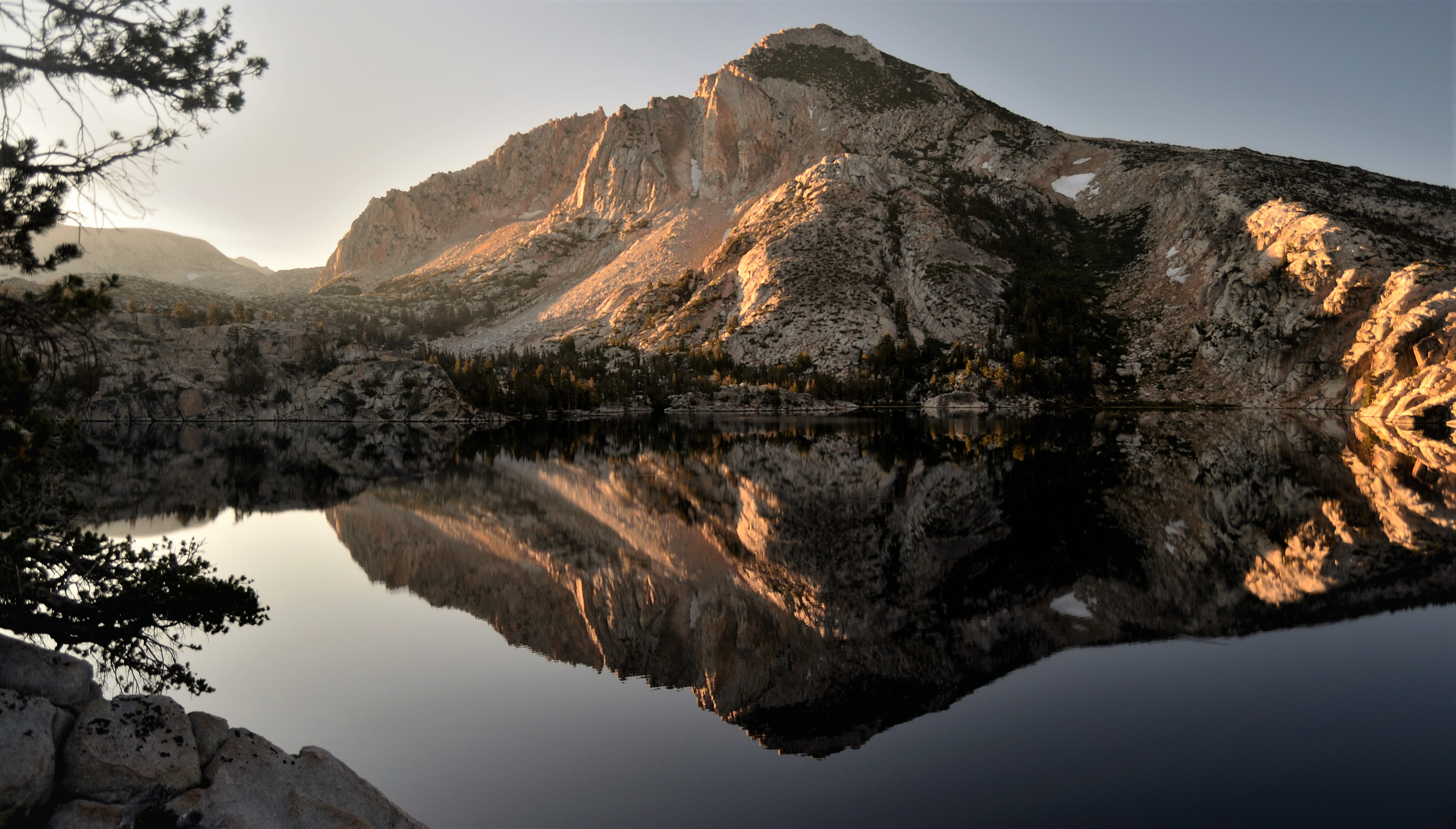
- Crown Point reflected in Peeler Lake

Highest point
- Elevation: 11,346 ft (3,458 m)
- Prominence: 1,306 ft (398 m)
- Parent peak: Eocene Peak
- Isolation: 2.18 mi (3.51 km)
- Listing: Vagmarken Club Sierra Crest List
- Coordinates: 38°06′39″N 119°27′27″W

Geography
- Location within California Location within the United States
- Location: Mono and Tuolumne counties, California, U.S.
- Parent range: Sierra Nevada
- Topo map: USGS Matterhorn Peak

Geology
- Rock age: Cretaceous
- Mountain type: Fault block
- Rock type: Metamorphic rock

Climbing
- First ascent: 1905 by George R. Davis, A.H. Sylvester and Pearson Chapman
- Easiest route: Simple scramble, (class 2)

Crown Point is a mountain with a summit elevation of 11,346 feet (3,458 m) located in the Sierra Nevada mountain range, in Mono County of northern California, United States. The summit is set in the Hoover Wilderness on land managed by Humboldt–Toiyabe National Forest, whereas the lower southwest slope is set within Yosemite National Park and Tuolumne County. The peak is situated approximately five miles southwest of Twin Lakes, one mile southeast of Peeler Lake, three miles southeast of Kettle Peak, and 4.3 miles (6.9 km) west-northwest of Matterhorn Peak. Topographic relief is significant as the northeast aspect rises over 2,100 feet (640 meters) above the Robinson Lakes in one mile. The first ascent of the summit was made in 1905 by George R. Davis, Albert Hale Sylvester, and Pearson Chapman, all with the United States Geological Survey.

== Climate ==
According to the Köppen climate classification system, Crown Point is located in an alpine climate zone. Most weather fronts originate in the Pacific Ocean, and travel east toward the Sierra Nevada mountains. As fronts approach, they are forced upward by the peaks, causing moisture in the form of rain or snowfall to drop onto the range (orographic lift). Precipitation runoff from this mountain drains into headwaters of Robinson Creek which is a tributary of the Walker River, as well as west into Rancheria Creek which is a Tuolumne River tributary.

== Gallery ==
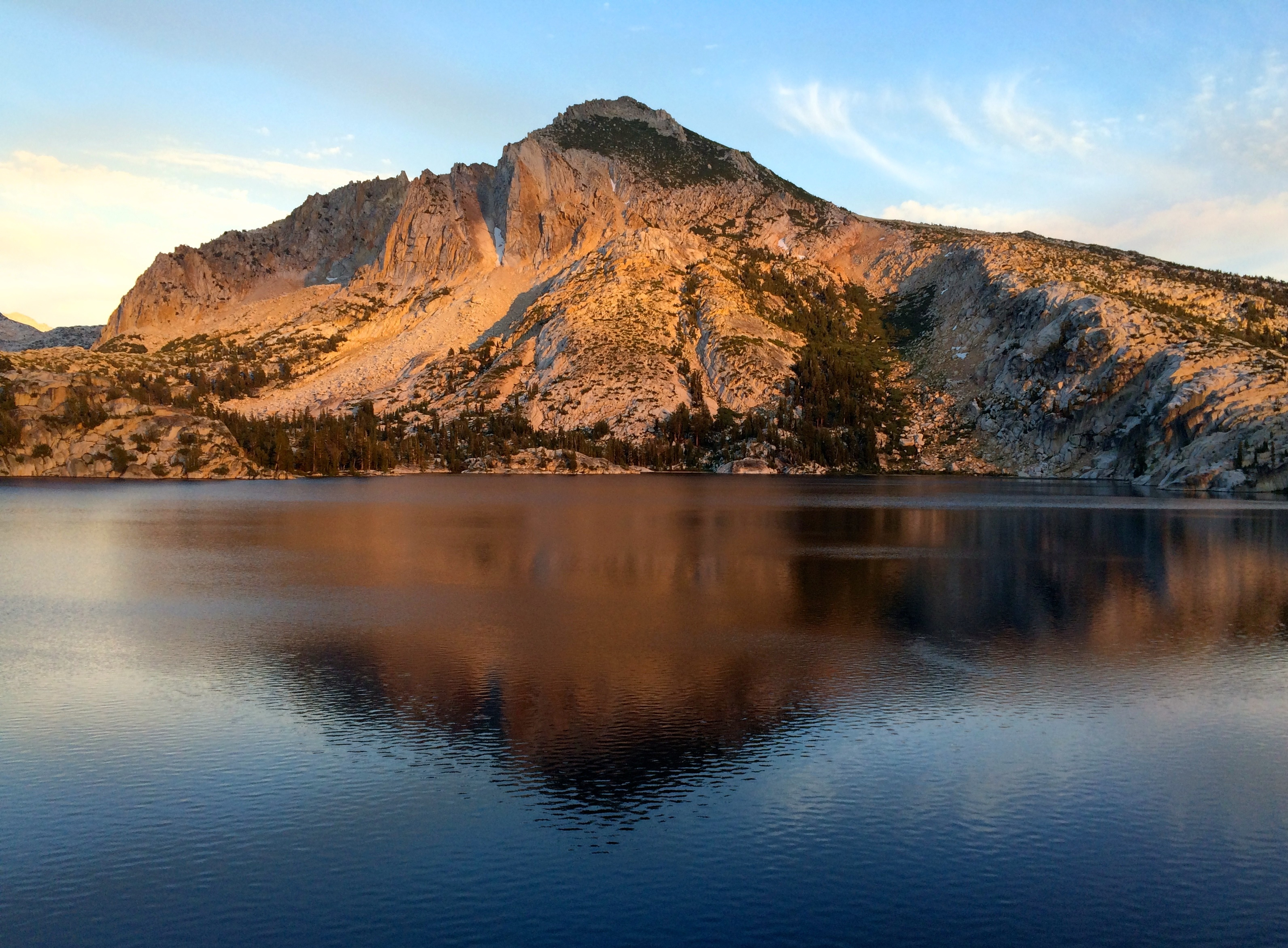
Crown Point with Peeler Lake

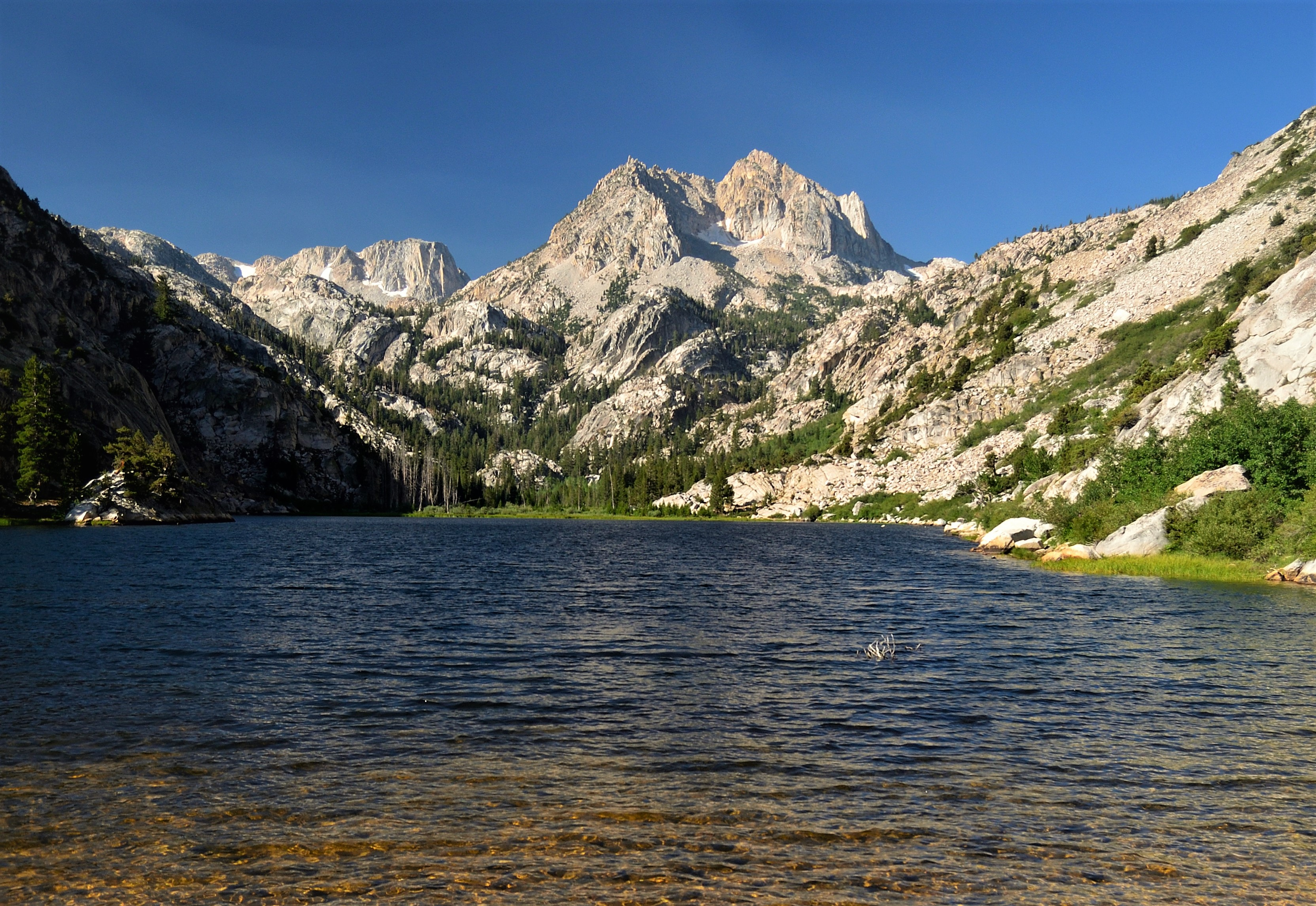
Crown Point from Barney Lake

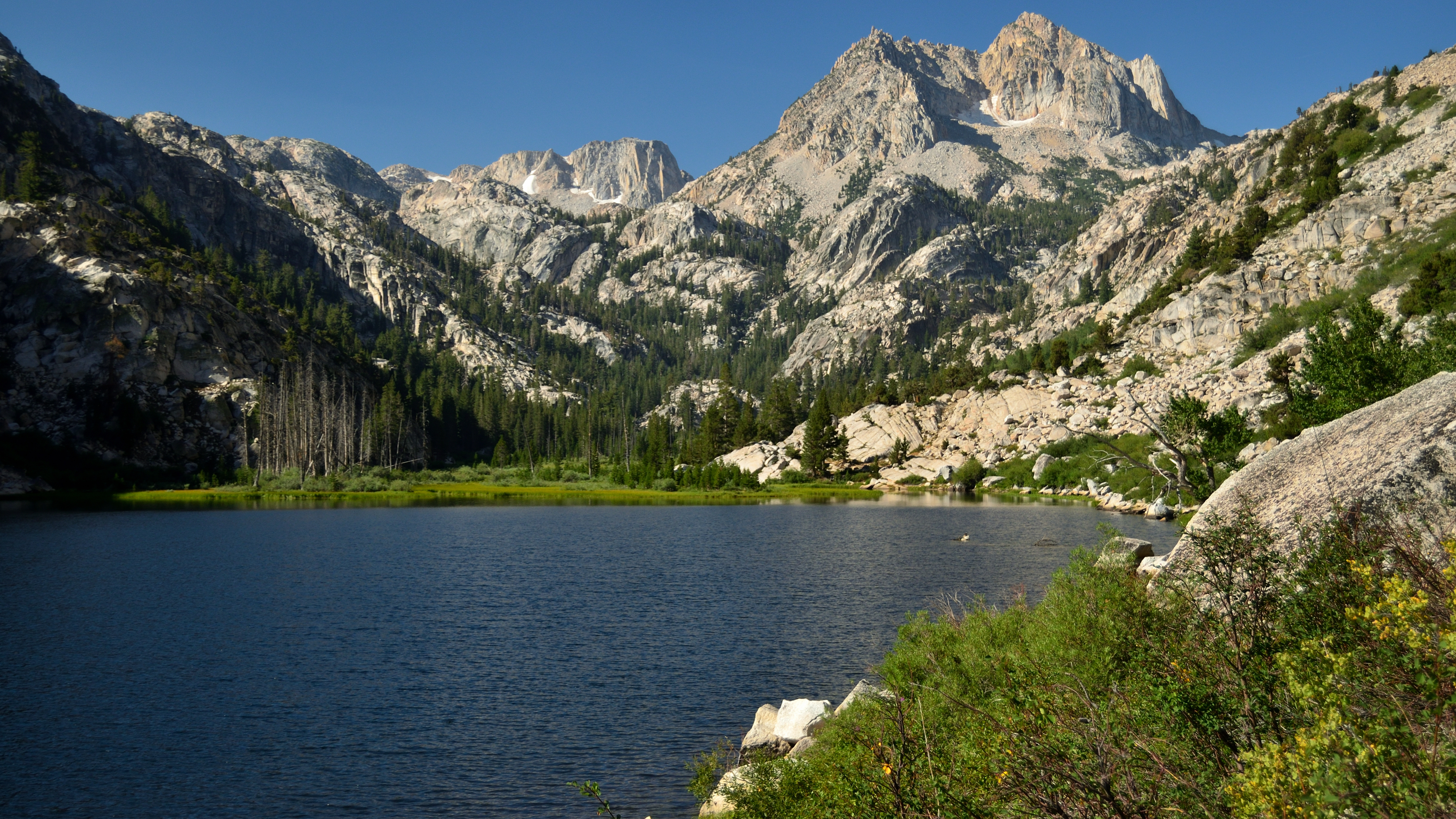
From Barney Lake

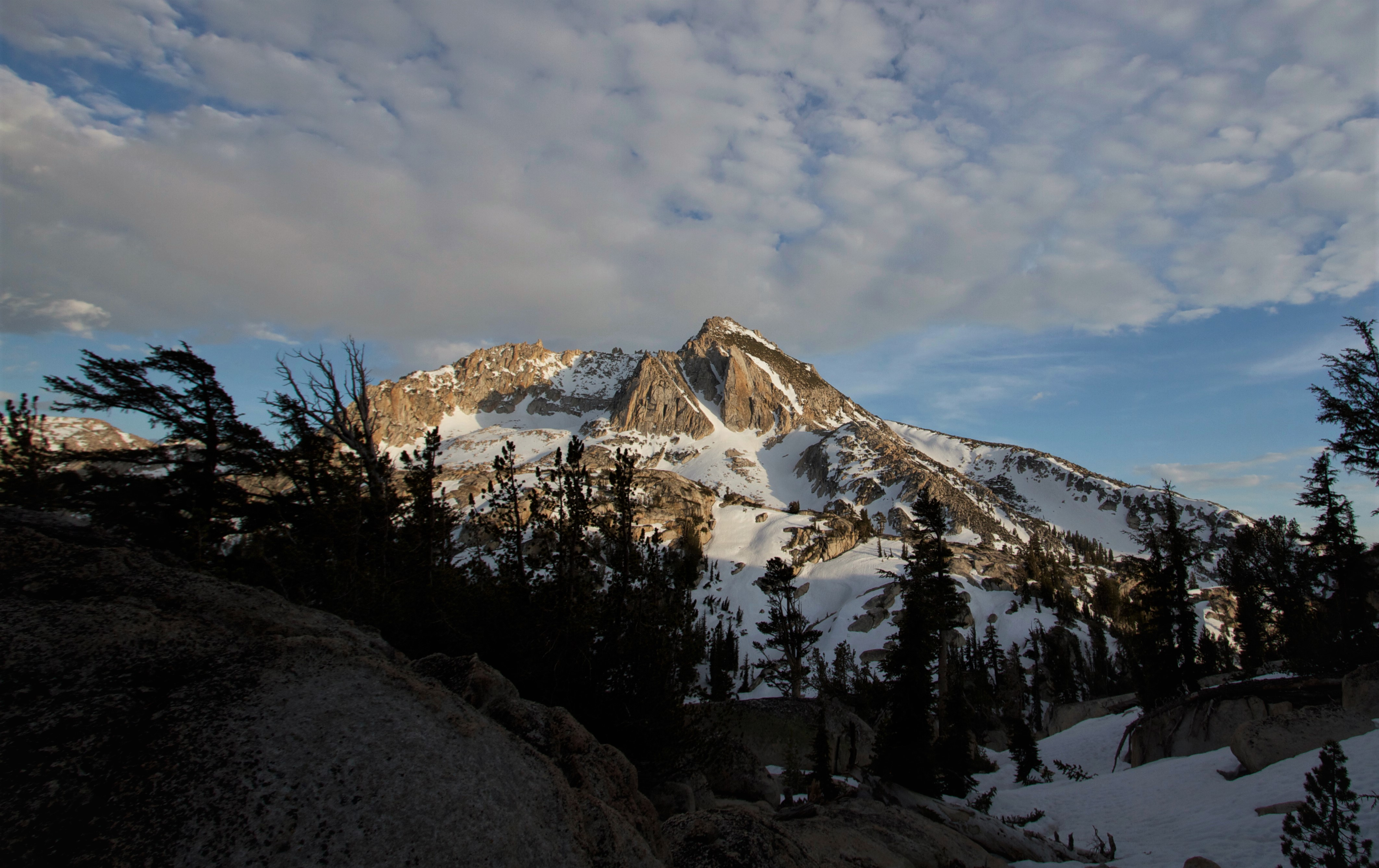
Northwest aspect

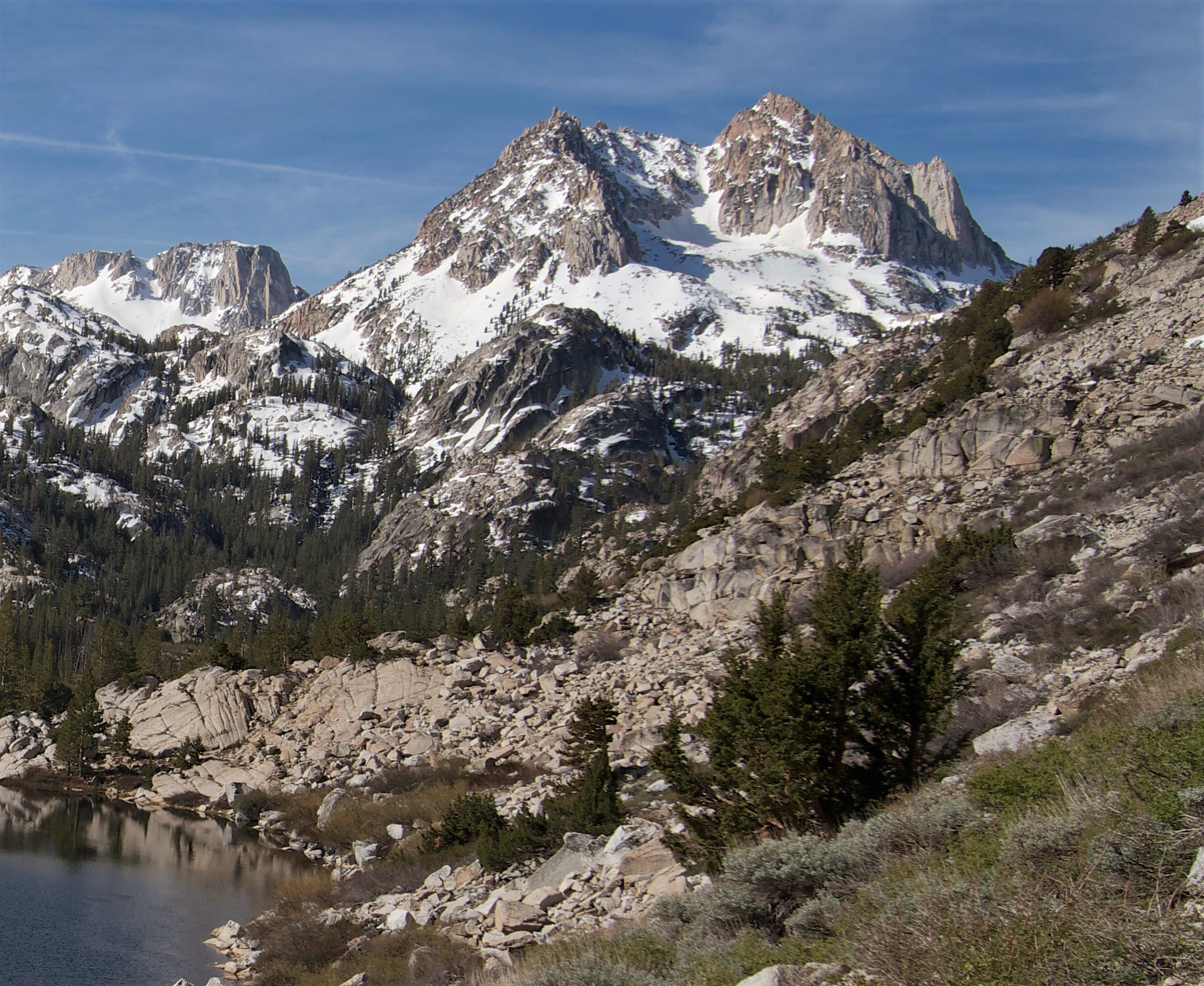
NNE aspect

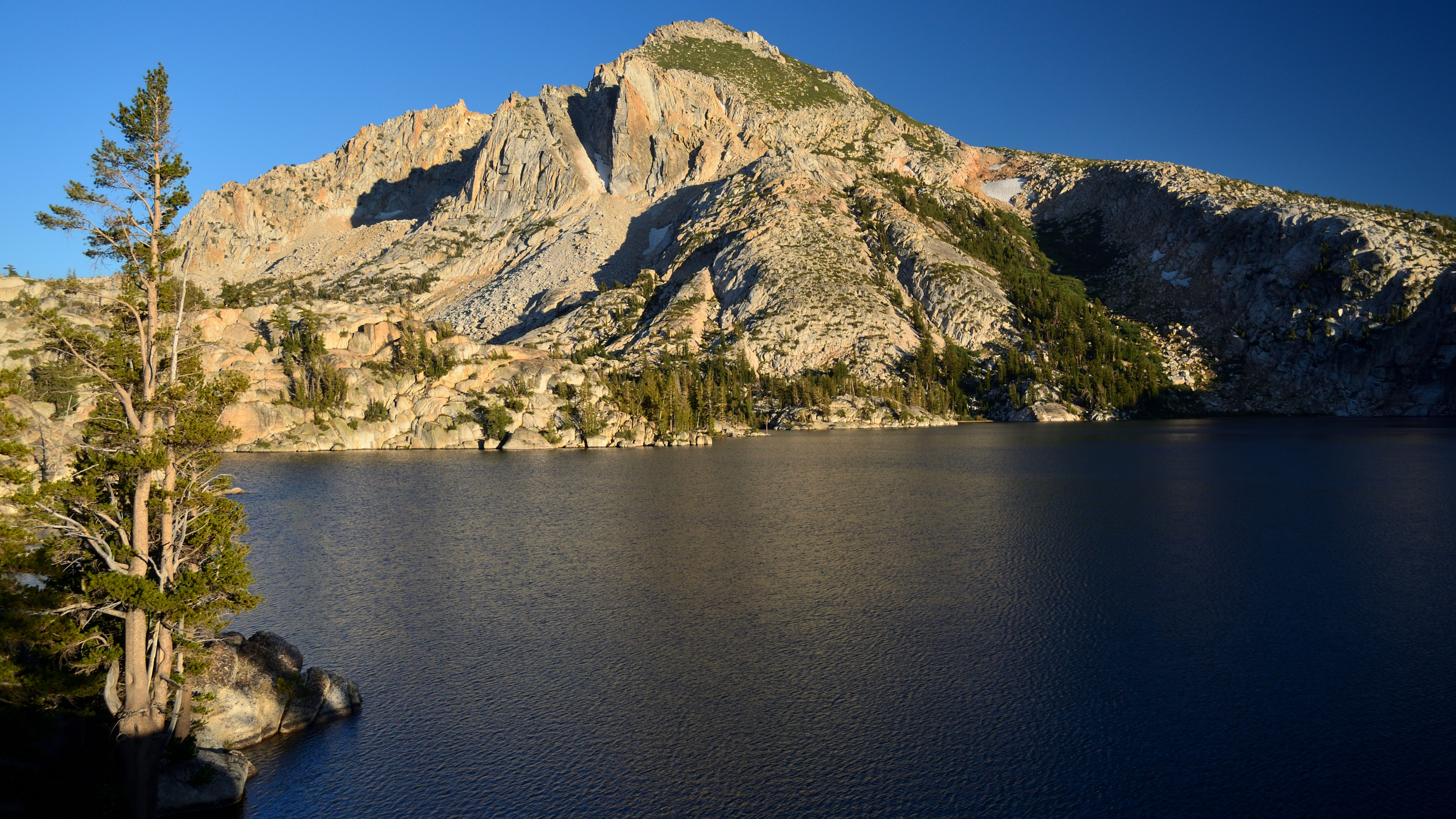
From Peeler Lake

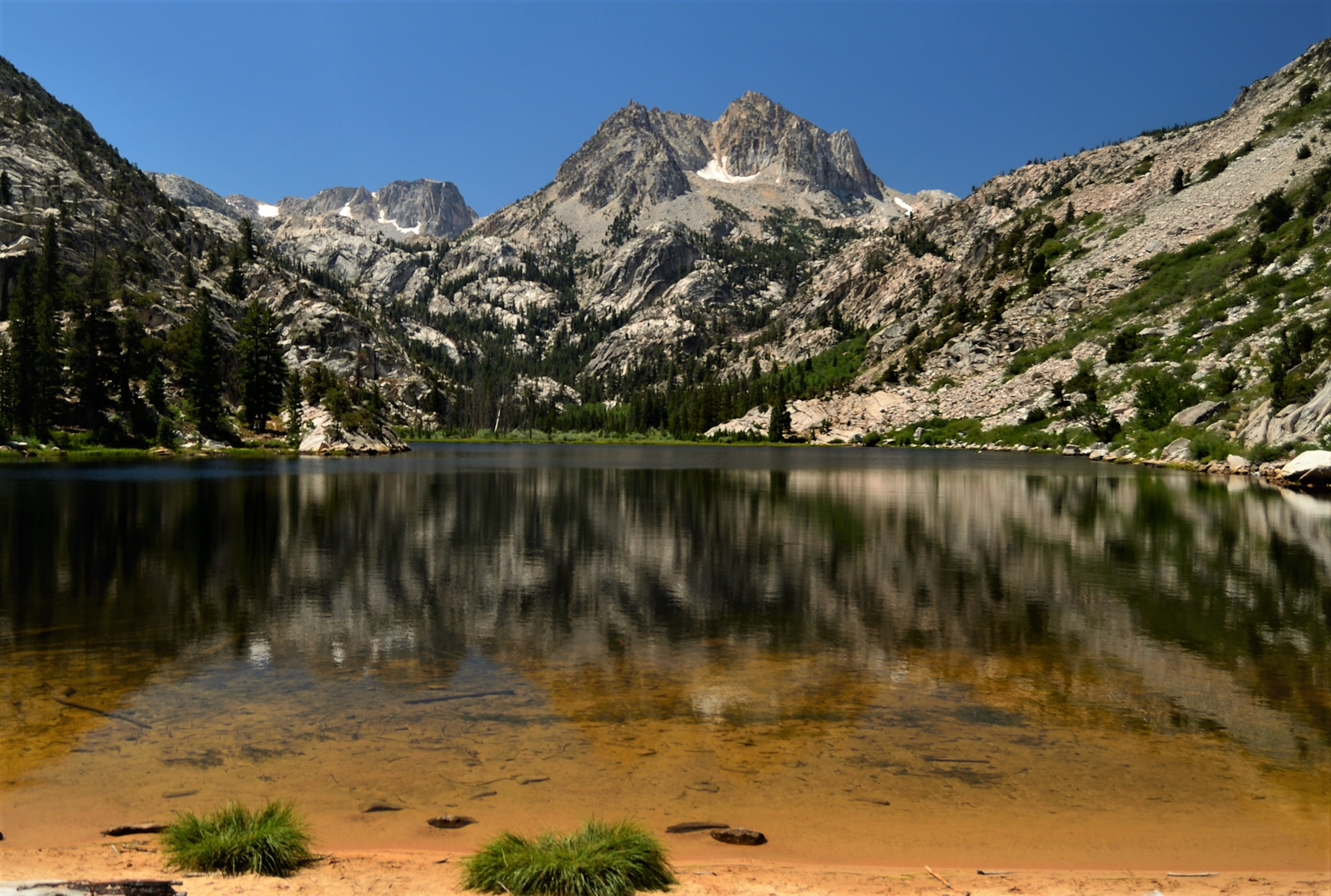
From Barney Lake

== See also ==
- List of mountain peaks of California
