= Twin Lakes (Mono County, California) =

Twin Lakes in Mono County, California can refer to:

- Twin Lakes (Mammoth Lakes, California), approximately 3 miles (5 km) southwest of Mammoth Lakes town center
- Twin Lakes (Bridgeport, California), approximately 9 miles (14 km) southwest of Bridgeport
- Twin Lakes, Mono County, California, a census-designated place surrounding the Twin Lakes southwest of Bridgeport
