= Eocene Peak =

Mountain in the state of California

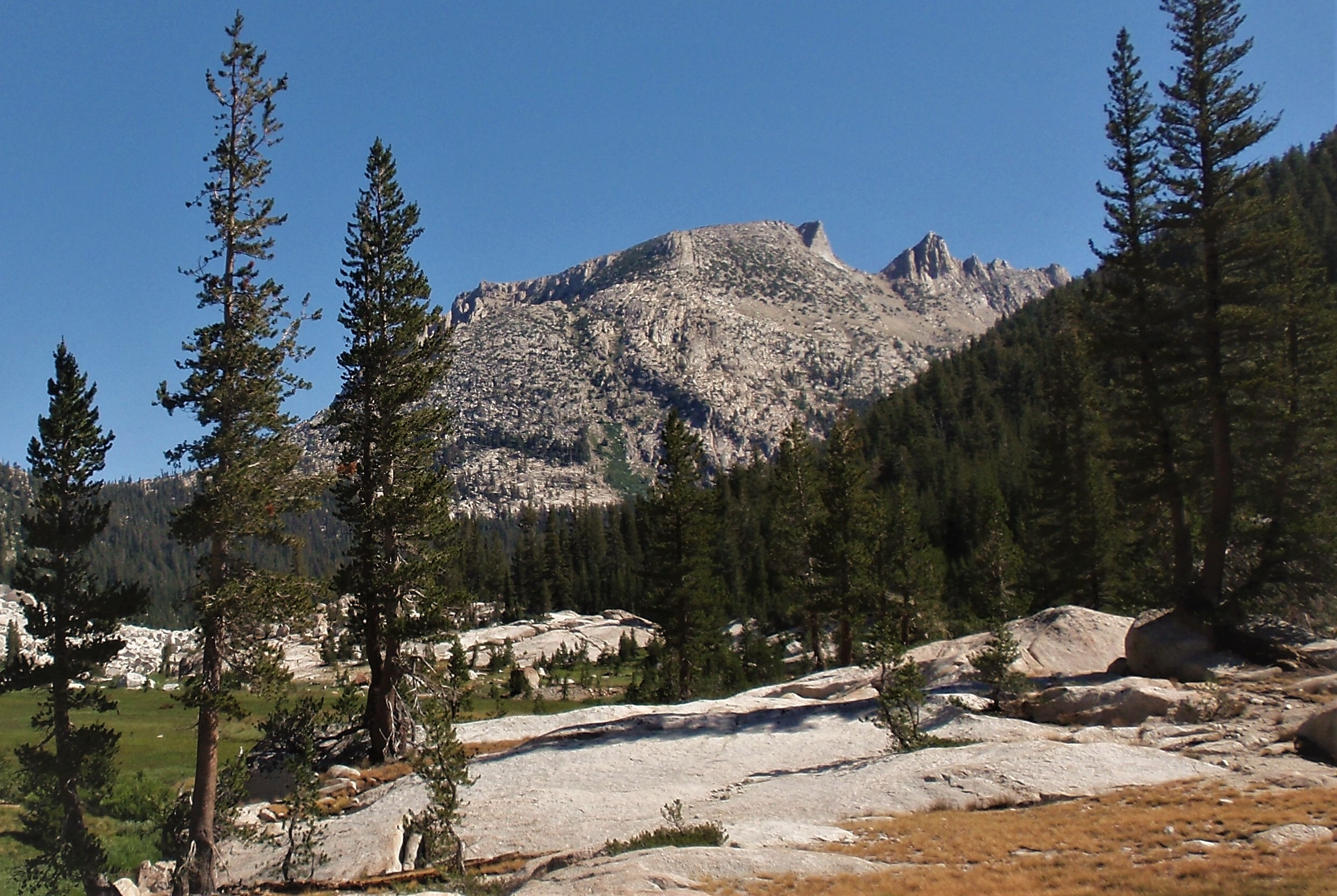
- Southwest aspect, from Slide Canyon

Highest point
- Elevation: 11,569 ft (3,526 m)
- Prominence: 409 ft (125 m)
- Parent peak: Sawtooth Ridge (11,780 ft)
- Isolation: 1.05 mi (1.69 km)
- Coordinates: 38°06′29″N 119°24′51″W

Naming
- Etymology: Eocene

Geography
- Location within California Location within the United States
- Location: Yosemite National Park; Mono / Tuolumne counties California, U.S.
- Parent range: Sierra Nevada
- Topo map: USGS Matterhorn Peak

Geology
- Rock age: Cretaceous
- Mountain type: Fault block
- Rock type: Granodiorite

Climbing
- First ascent: 1932
- Easiest route: class 2 Southwest slope

Eocene Peak is a granitic summit with an elevation of 11,569 feet (3,526 m) located on the crest of the Sierra Nevada mountain range, in northern California, United States. The summit is situated on the common boundary shared by Yosemite National Park with Hoover Wilderness, as well as the common border of Mono County and Tuolumne County. The peak is set approximately three miles southwest of Twin Lakes, 1.3 mile southeast of Kettle Peak, and one mile south of The Incredible Hulk. The nearest town is Bridgeport, 15 miles to the northeast. Topographic relief is significant as the summit rises nearly 2,000 feet (610 meters) above Piute Creek in one mile. The first ascent of the summit was made July 16, 1932, by Richard M. Leonard and Herbert B. Blanks. This landform's name has not been officially adopted by the U.S. Board on Geographic Names, so the feature is not labeled on USGS maps.

== Climate ==
According to the Köppen climate classification system, Eocene Peak is located in an alpine climate zone. Most weather fronts originate in the Pacific Ocean, and travel east toward the Sierra Nevada mountains. As fronts approach, they are forced upward by the peaks (orographic lift), causing moisture in the form of rain or snowfall to drop onto the range. Precipitation runoff from this landform drains north into Blacksmith Creek which is part of the Walker River drainage basin, and south into Piute Creek which is a tributary of the Tuolumne River.

== See also ==
- Geology of the Yosemite area
- Tuolumne Intrusive Suite

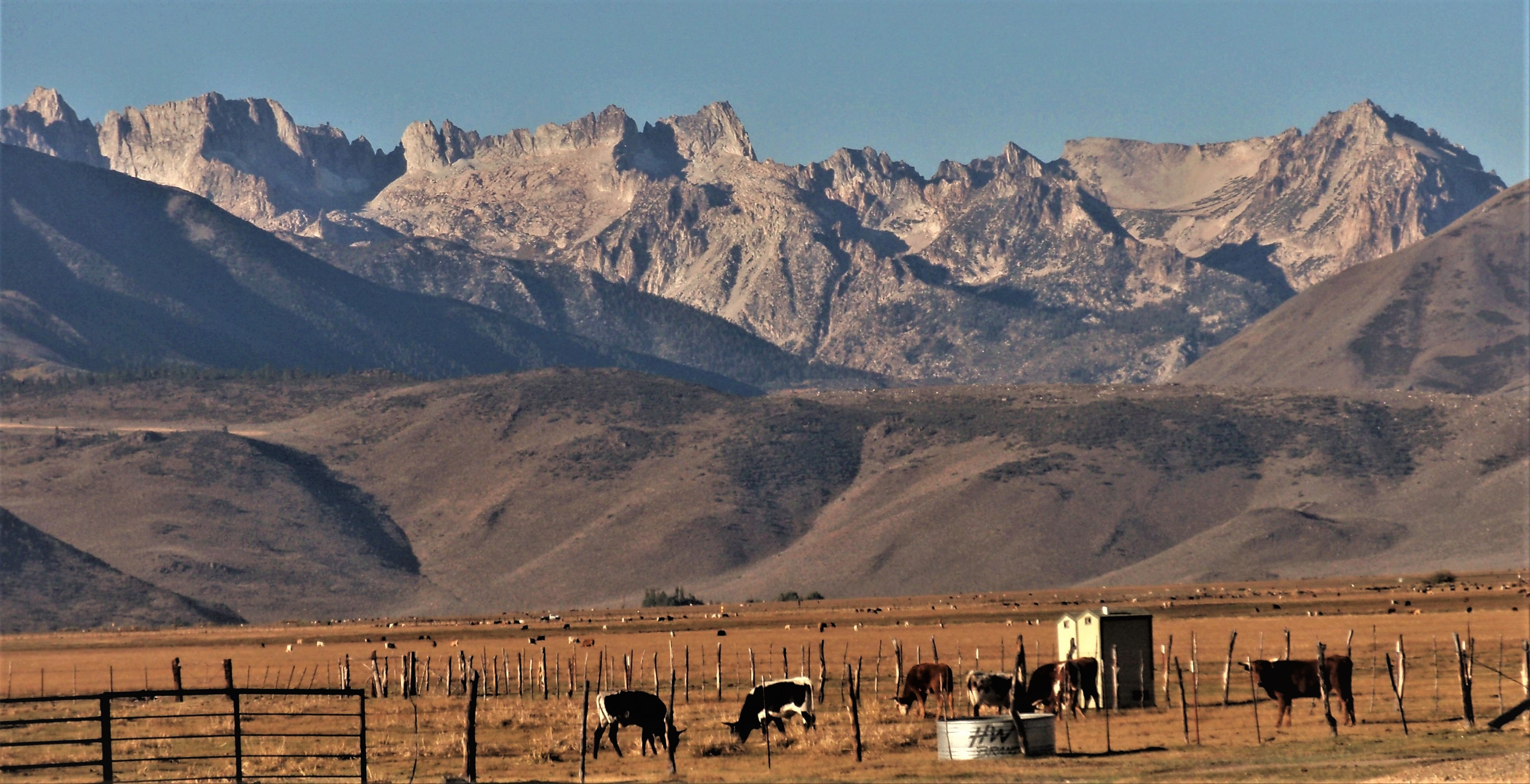
Sawtooth Ridge with Eocene Peak in upper right. Northeast aspect.
