= Peeler Lake =

Lake in the state of California, United States

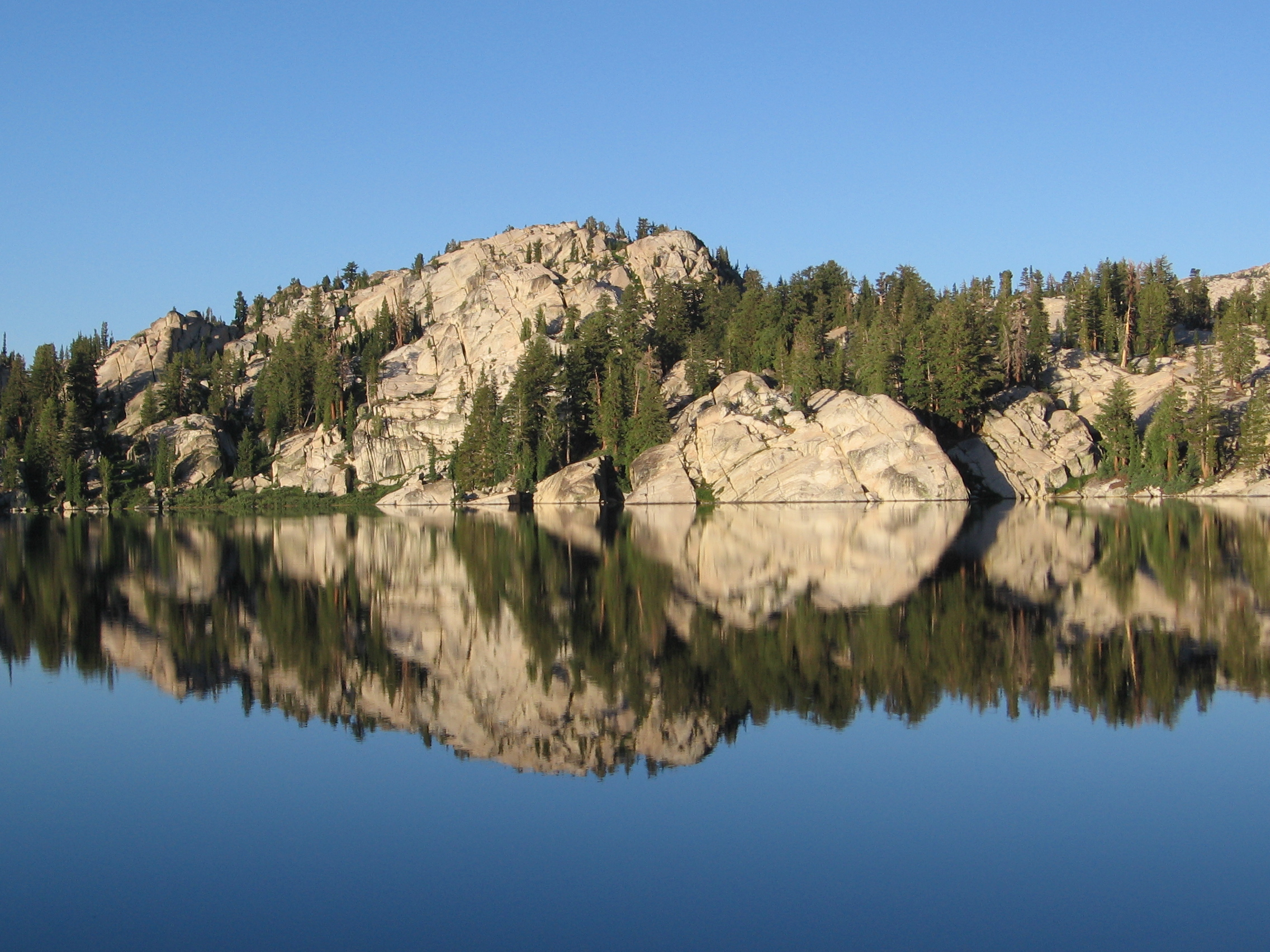
- Peeler Lake in July 2009

- Location within California Location within the United States
- Location: Mono County, California
- Coordinates: 38°07′14″N 119°28′04″W
- Basin countries: United States
- Surface elevation: 9,488 feet (2,892 m)

Peeler Lake is a California landform within the Toiyabe National Forest and on the west edge of the Hoover Wilderness. One of the few bodies of water on the Great Basin Divide, Peeler Lake's inflow is sufficient for outlet streams over 2 Sierra Crest sills of similar elevation to respectively drain westward to the Pacific Ocean (Rancheria Creek, Tuolumne & San Joaquin Rivers, and Suisun & San Francisco Bays) and eastward into the Great Basin (Robinson Creek, East Walker & Walker Rivers, Walker Lake sink). Peeler Lake's saddle area is a mountain pass between the west Sierra slope (Tuolumne County) and the Sierra Escarpment (Mono County) to the east, and the lake level of 9,488 ft (2,892 m) is over 1,000 ft (300 m) below the summits of Cirque Mountain (north) and Crown Point (south). The namesake Peeler Lake Trail of 1.5 mi (2.4 km) from the east reaches the lake from the Robinson Creek Trailhead parking at the west side of Twin Lakes (formerly Mono Village), and the Bridgeport Ranger Station issues overnight permits for the backcountry area of the lake.

Peeler Lake was named in 1925 for Barney Peeler (1833–1920) of nearby Bridgeport (as was Barney Lake downstream to the east), and the lake was added to the Geographic Names Information System in 2000. In 2006, an environmental evaluation of the lake concluded "the nitrate concentration of 17 μeq/L to be too high to come from atmospheric deposition alone."

== See also ==
- List of lakes in California
