= The Incredible Hulk (California) =

Summit in the Sierra Nevada of California

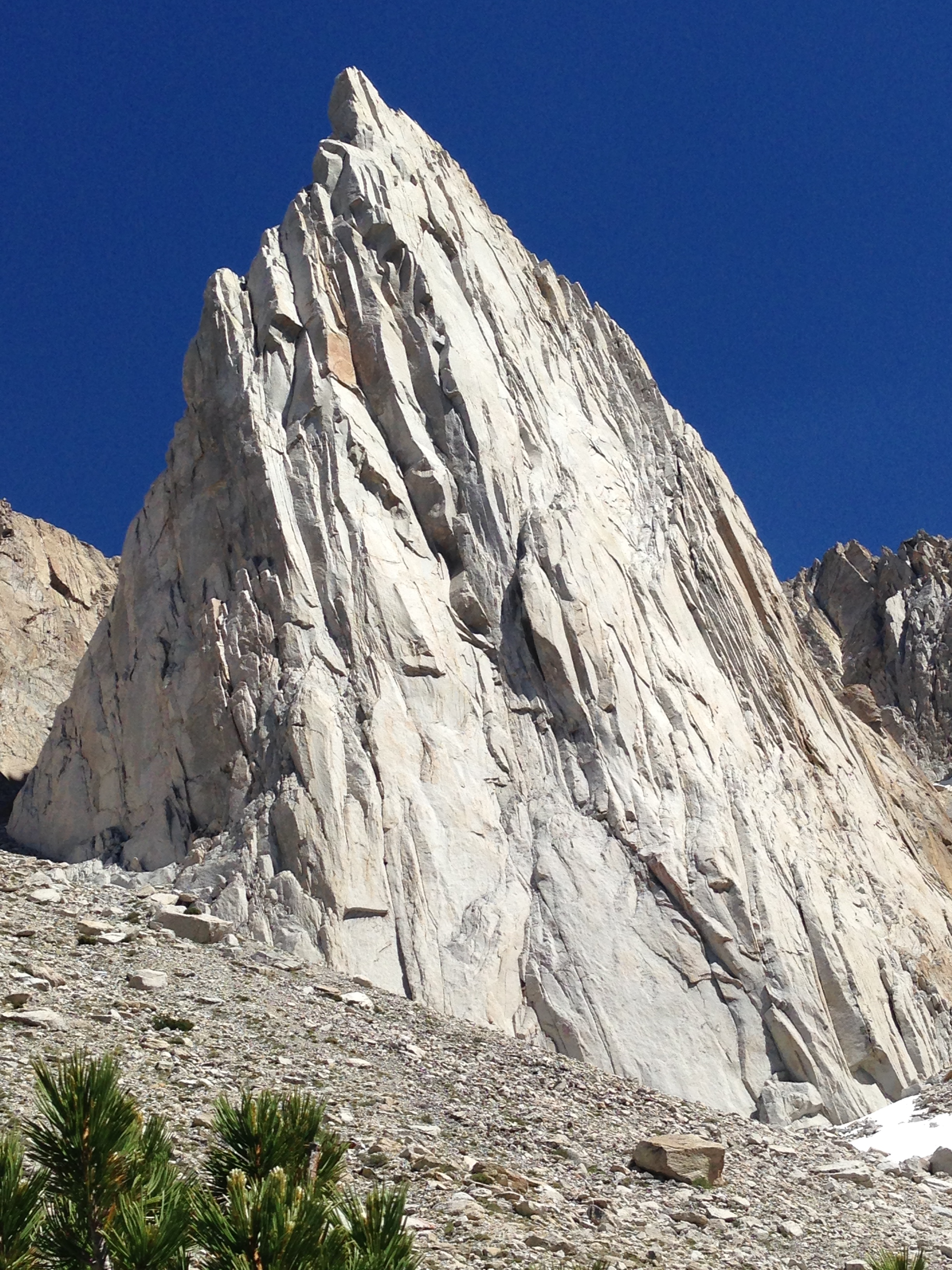
- West aspect

Highest point
- Elevation: 11,300 ft (3,444 m)
- Prominence: 240 ft (73 m)
- Parent peak: Eocene Peak (11,569 ft)
- Isolation: 0.90 mi (1.45 km)
- Coordinates: 38°07′16″N 119°24′52″W

Geography
- Location within California Location within the United States
- Location: Mono County, California, U.S.
- Parent range: Sierra Nevada
- Topo map: USGS Matterhorn Peak

Geology
- Rock age: Cretaceous
- Mountain type: Fault block
- Rock type: Granodiorite

Climbing
- First ascent: 1936
- Easiest route: climbing Southwest Couloir

The Incredible Hulk, or Incredible Hulk, is a granitic summit with an elevation of 11,300 feet (3,444 m) located in the Sierra Nevada mountain range, in Mono County of northern California, United States. The summit is set in Little Slide Canyon of the Hoover Wilderness, on land managed by Humboldt–Toiyabe National Forest, and is one mile outside the boundary of Yosemite National Park. The peak is situated approximately three miles southwest of Twin Lakes, three-quarters mile east of Kettle Peak, and 2.5 miles northwest of Matterhorn Peak. The nearest town is Bridgeport, 14 miles to the northeast. Topographic relief is significant as the summit rises 3,700 feet (1,100 meters) above Robinson Creek in one mile (1.6 km). Incredible Hulk is the unofficial name of this landform, and will remain unofficial as long as the USGS policy of not adopting new toponyms in designated wilderness areas remains in effect.

== Climbing ==
The first ascent of the summit was made September 6, 1936, by Bestor Robinson, Florence Robinson, Don Woods, and Carl Jensen.

Established rock climbing routes on the 1,200-foot-high walls of Incredible Hulk:

- The Donaldson Route – class 5.8 – First Ascent 1970 by Greg Donaldson, Joe Kiskis, Bob Grow
- Mountaineers Route (Southwest Couloir) – class 4-5 – FA 1971 by Bob Grow, Joe Kiskis
- Fallen Leaf – class 5.9 – FA 1970s by Mike Farrell, partner
- Red Dihedral – class 5.10 – FA 1975 by Dale Bard, Mike Farrell, Bob Locke
- Polish Route – class 5.10 – FA 1976 by Bob Harrington, Rick Wheeler
- Positive Vibrations – class 5.11b – FA 1981 by Bob Harrington, Alan Bartlett
- Astrohulk – class 5.11 – FA 1996 by Dave Nettle, Mike Davis
- Escape from Poland – class 5.10 – FA 1998 by Dave Nettle, John Fehrman
- Sun Spot Dihedral – class 5.11b – FA 1999 by Dave Nettle, Jimmy Haden
- Airstream – class 5.13 – FA 2004 by Peter Croft, Dave Nettle, Greg Epperson
- The Venturi Effect – class 5.13 – FA 2004 by Peter Croft, Dave Nettle
- Blowhard – class 5.12 – FA 2005 by Peter Croft, Andrew Stevens
- Solar Flare – class 5.12 – FA 2007 by Peter Croft, Conrad Anker
- Eye of the Storm – class 5.12 – FA 2007 by Nils Davis, Brent Obinger
- Sun Burn – class 5.12 – FA 2008 by Peter Croft, Dave Nettle
- Wind Shear – class 5.12 – FA 2016 by Peter Croft, Dave Nettle, Andy Puhvel
- Lenticular Gyrations – class 5.12 – FA 2016 by Aaron Cassebeer, Jeff Gicklhorn, Patrick O'Donnell

Red Dihedral (originally named "Yggdrasil") and Positive Vibrations are considered classic climbing routes in the Sierra Nevada.

== Climate ==
According to the Köppen climate classification system, The Incredible Hulk is located in an alpine climate zone. Most weather fronts originate in the Pacific Ocean, and travel east toward the Sierra Nevada mountains. As fronts approach, they are forced upward by the peaks (orographic lift), causing moisture in the form of rain or snowfall to drop onto the range. Precipitation runoff from this rock feature drains to Robinson Creek which is a tributary of the Walker River.

== See also ==
- Rock climbing

== Gallery ==
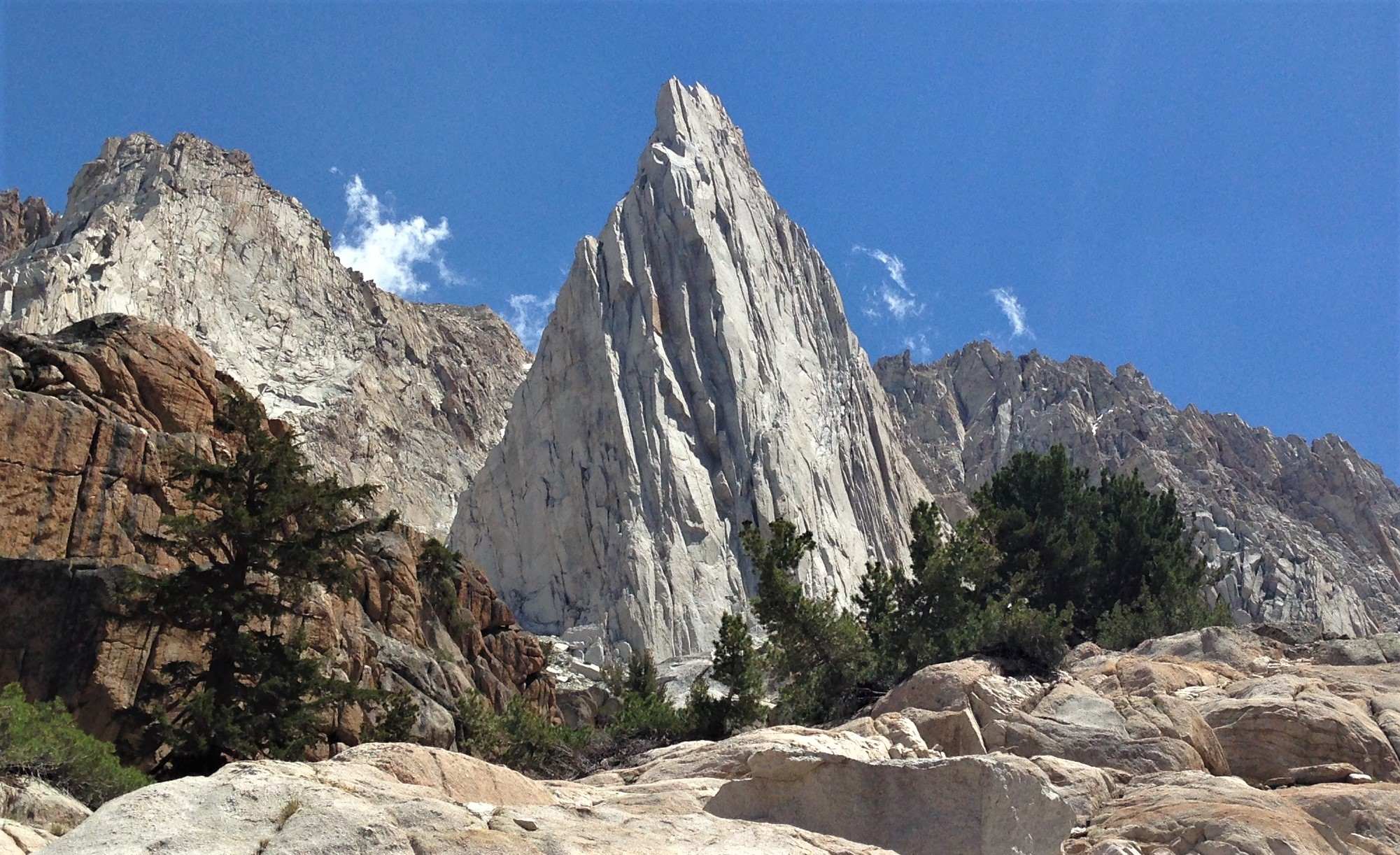
Northwest aspect

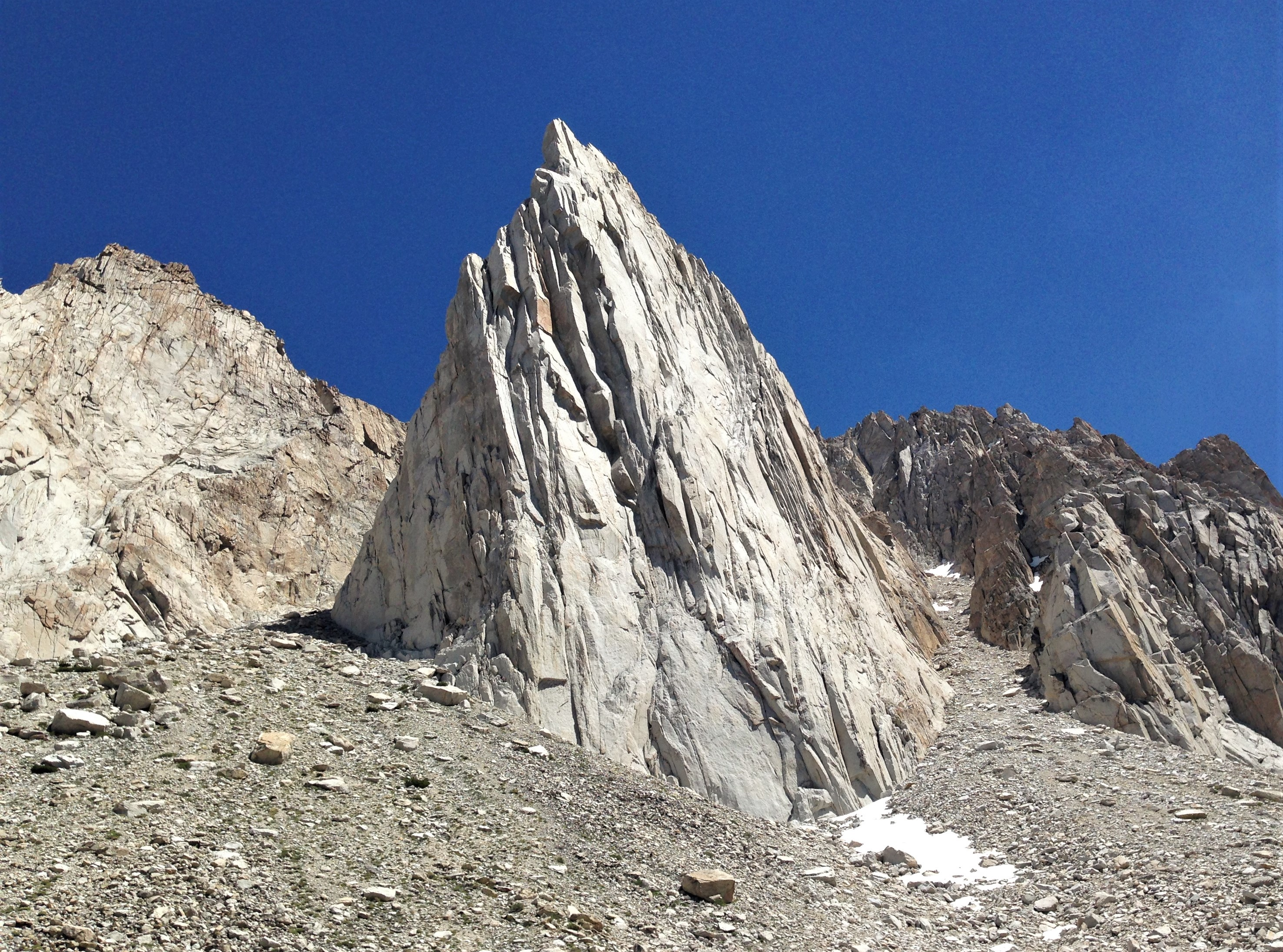

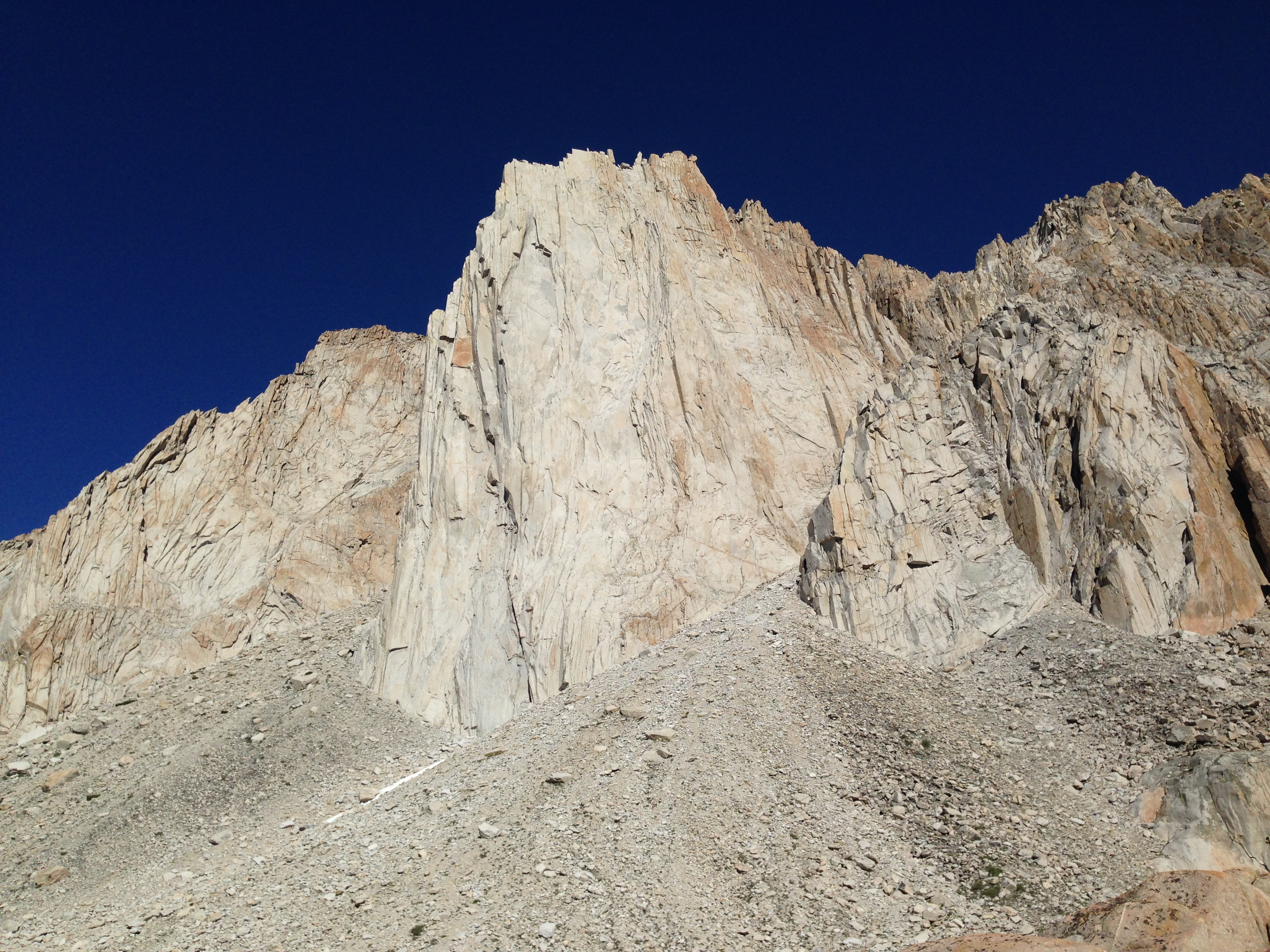
Southwest aspect

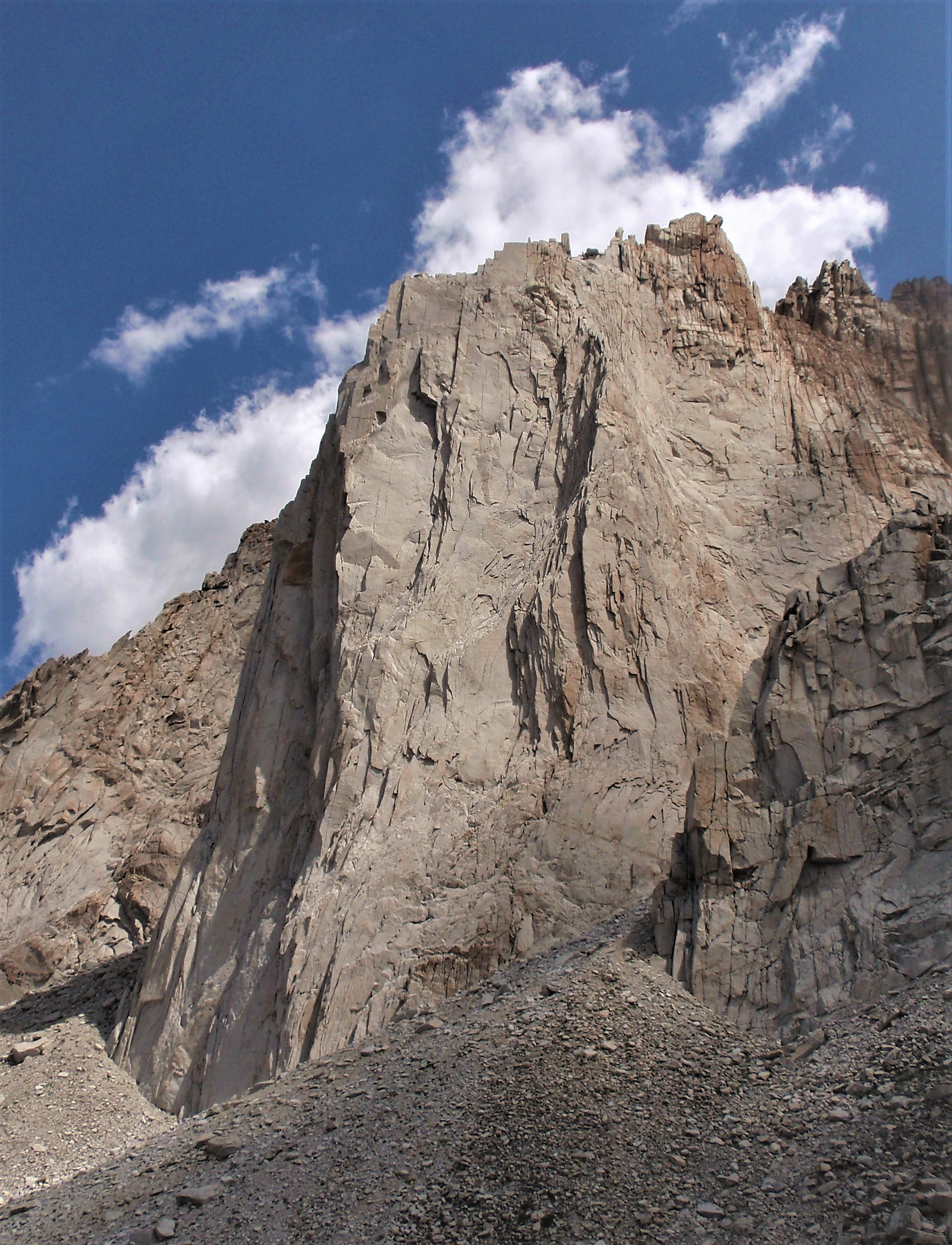

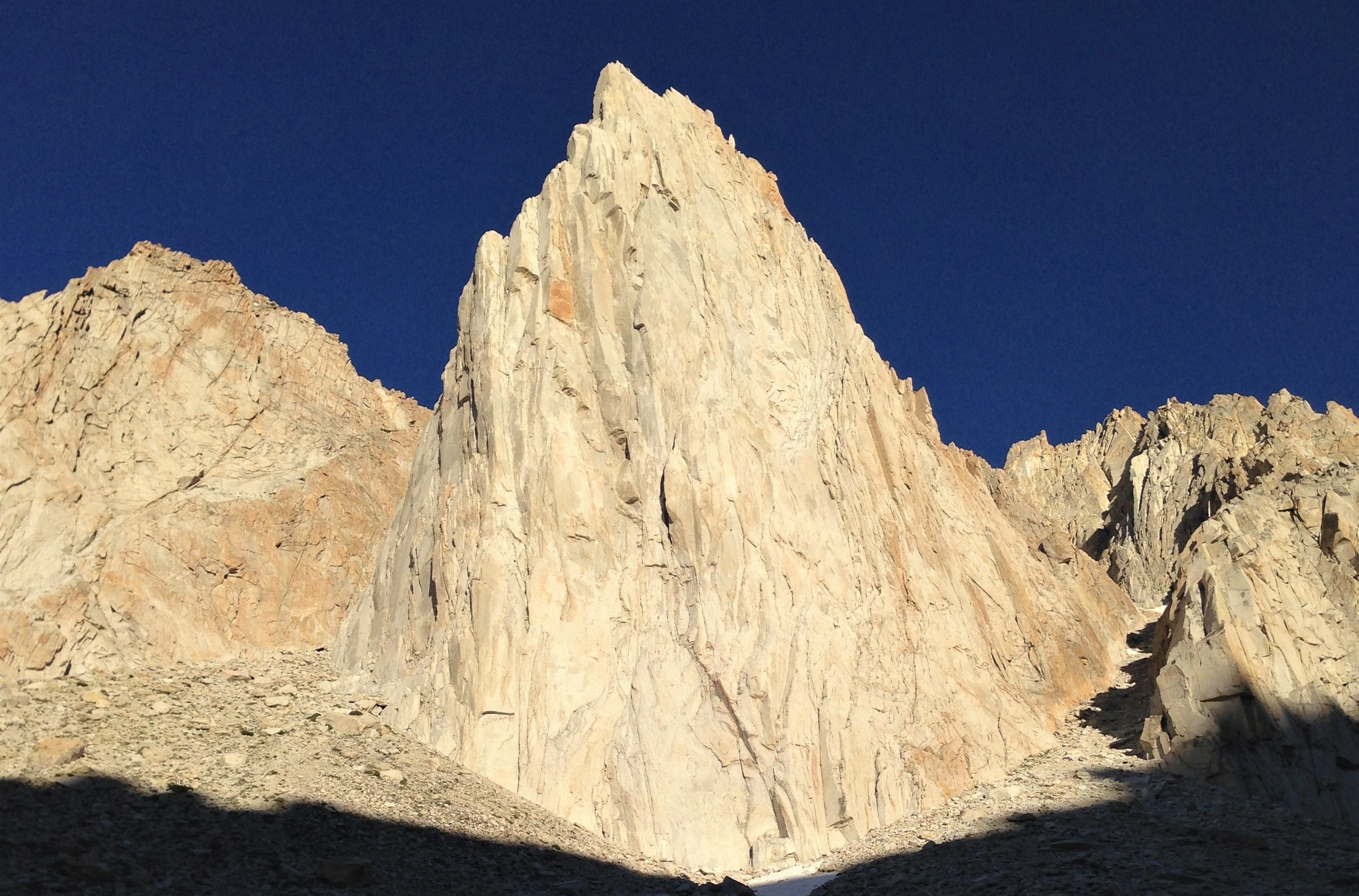

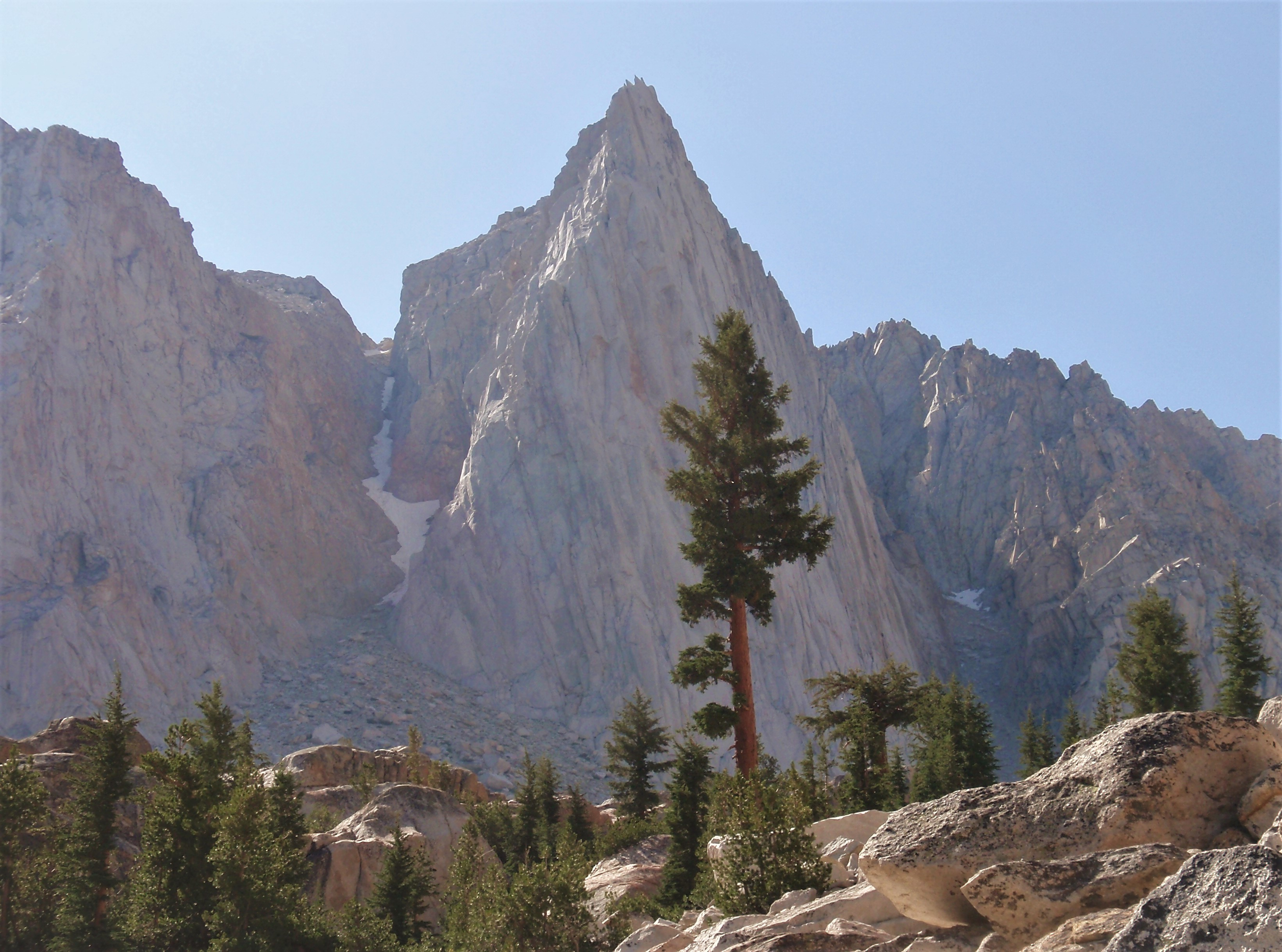

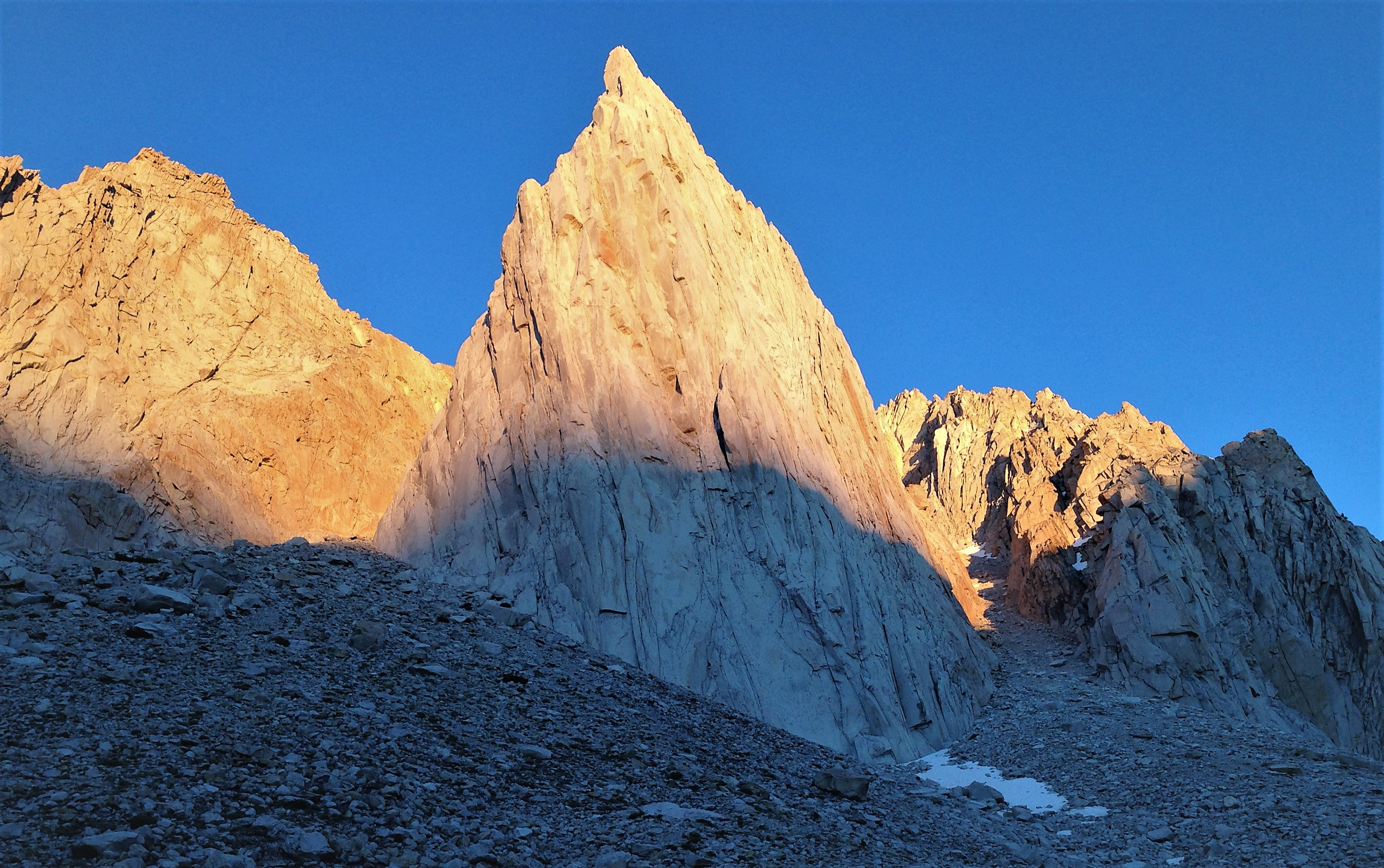

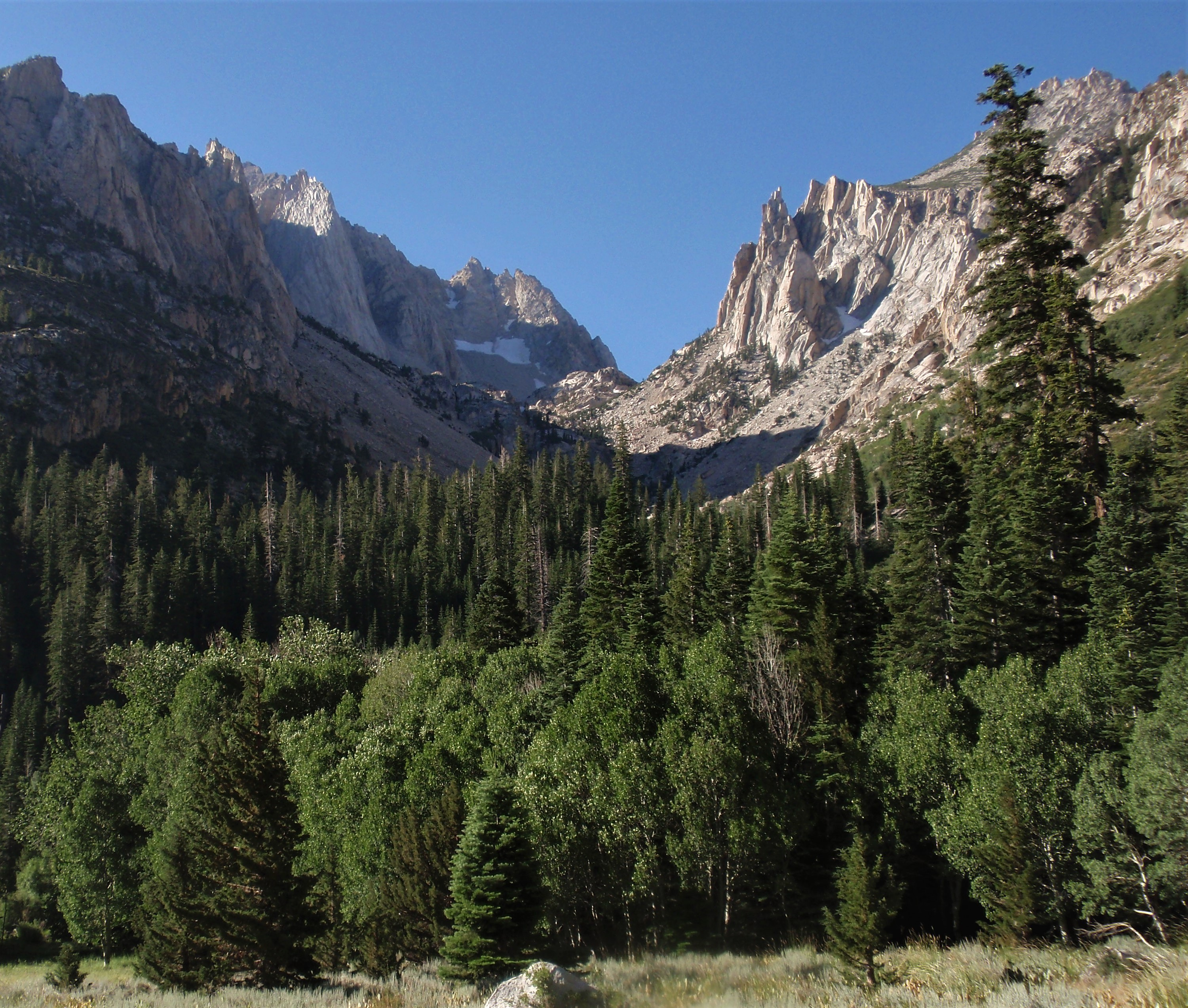
Little Slide Canyon with Incredible Hulk to left and Kettle Peak upper right
