= Kettle Peak =

Mountain in California, United States

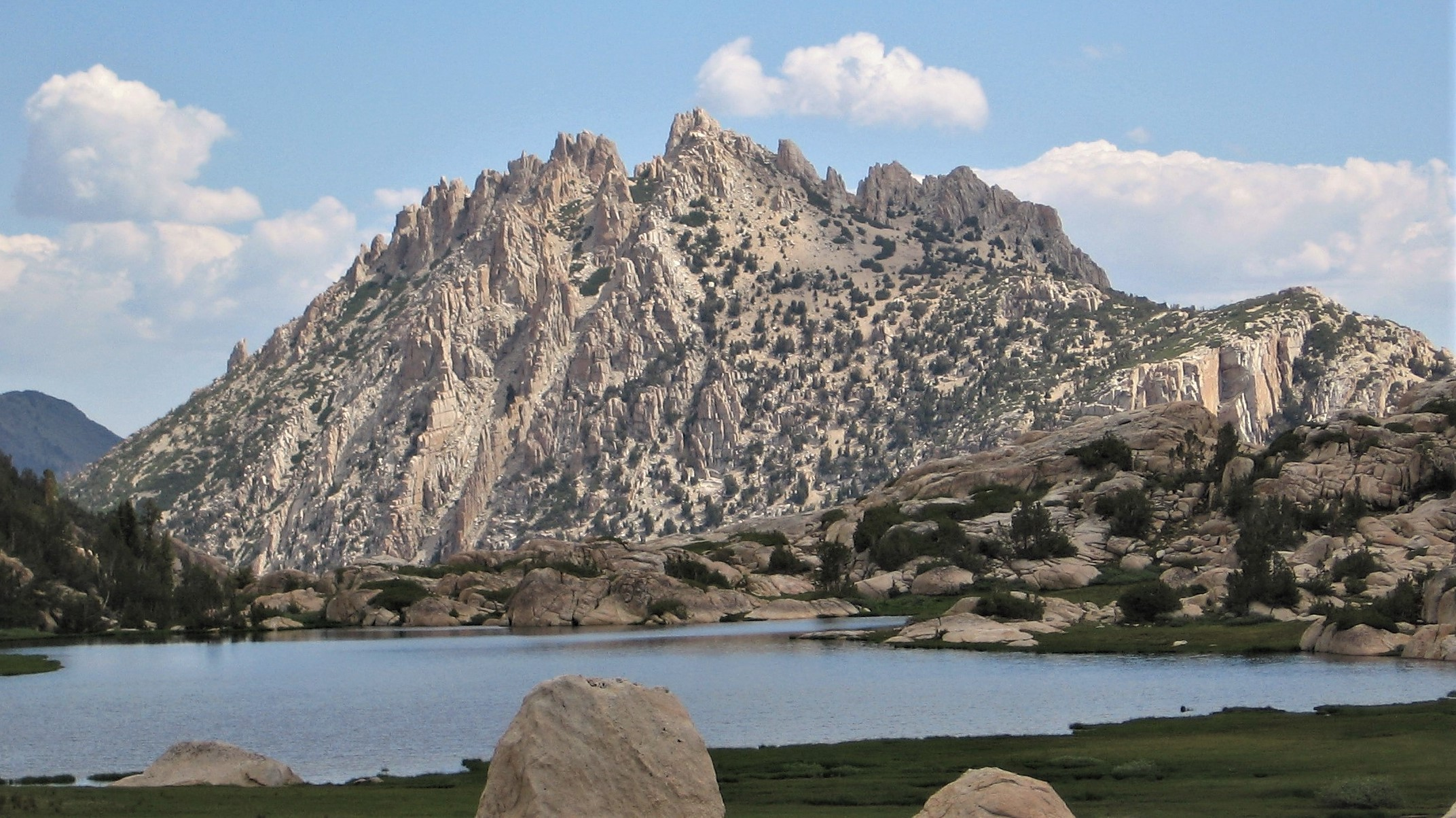
- Southwest aspect, from Snow Lake

Highest point
- Elevation: 11,010 ft (3,356 m)
- Prominence: 720 ft (219 m)
- Parent peak: Slide Mountain (11,084 ft)
- Isolation: 1.31 mi (2.11 km)
- Listing: Vagmarken Club Sierra Crest List
- Coordinates: 38°07′23″N 119°25′43″W

Geography
- Location within California Location within the United States
- Location: Mono County, California, U.S.
- Parent range: Sierra Nevada
- Topo map: USGS Matterhorn Peak

Geology
- Rock age: Cretaceous
- Mountain type: Fault block
- Rock type: Granodiorite

Climbing
- First ascent: 1948
- Easiest route: class 2 via Ice Lake Pass

Kettle Peak is a mountain with a summit elevation of 11,010 feet (3,356 m) located in the Sierra Nevada mountain range, in Mono County of northern California, United States. The summit is set in the Hoover Wilderness on land managed by Humboldt–Toiyabe National Forest, and is less than one-half mile outside the boundary of Yosemite National Park. The peak is situated approximately three miles southwest of Twin Lakes, three miles south of Victoria Peak, 2.9 miles northeast of Crown Point, and 3.1 miles northwest of Matterhorn Peak. Topographic relief is significant as the west aspect rises over 2,600 feet (790 meters) above Robinson Creek in one mile.

== History ==
Kettle Peak is the toponym officially adopted by the U.S. Board on Geographic Names for this 11,000-foot summit, which should not be confused with another Kettle Peak (10,000 ft) located in California's Sequoia National Park. This toponym was likely applied by the United States Geological Survey during a 1905–09 survey and it appears on the first edition of the 1911 Bridgeport Quadrangle map.

The first ascent of the summit was made in August 1948 by William Dunmire and Robert L. Swift.

== Climate ==
According to the Köppen climate classification system, Kettle Peak is located in an alpine climate zone. Most weather fronts originate in the Pacific Ocean, and travel east toward the Sierra Nevada mountains. As fronts approach, they are forced upward by the peaks, causing moisture in the form of rain or snowfall to drop onto the range (orographic lift). Precipitation runoff from this mountain drains into tributaries of Robinson Creek which is a tributary of the Walker River.

== See also ==
- List of mountain peaks of California

== Gallery ==
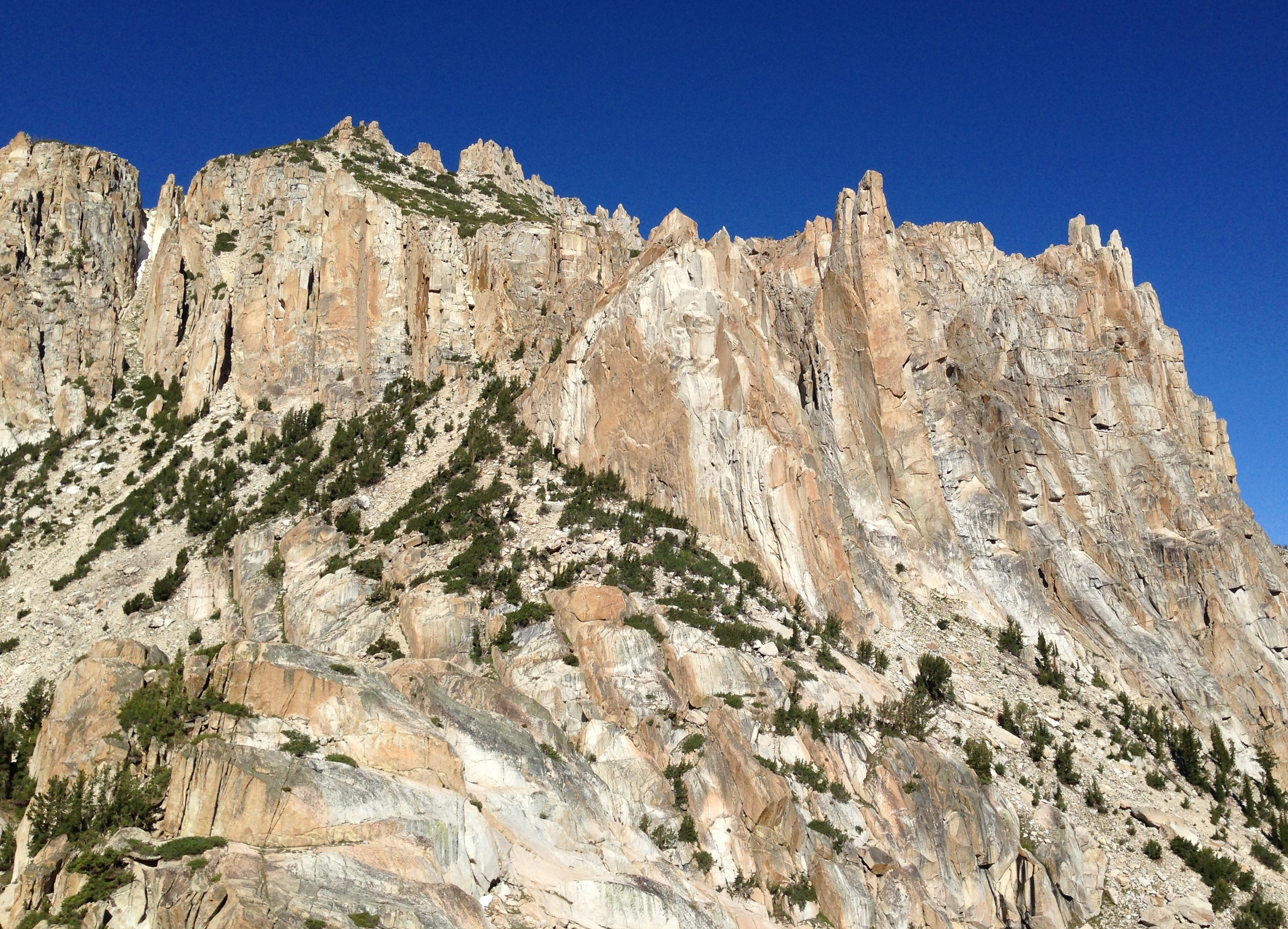
Kettle Peak, east aspect, from Little Slide Canyon

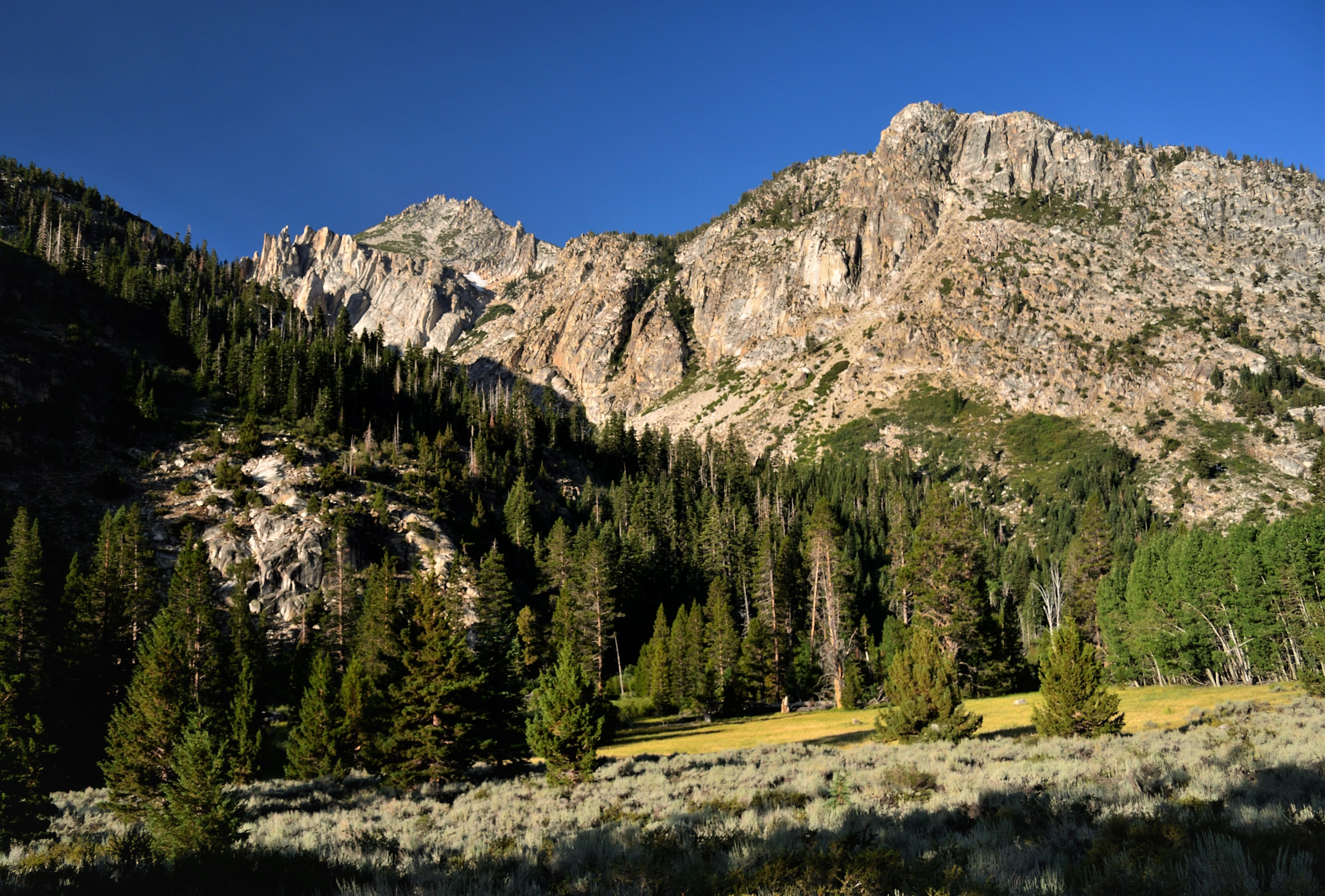
Kettle Peak seen from north-northeast. Summit left of center.

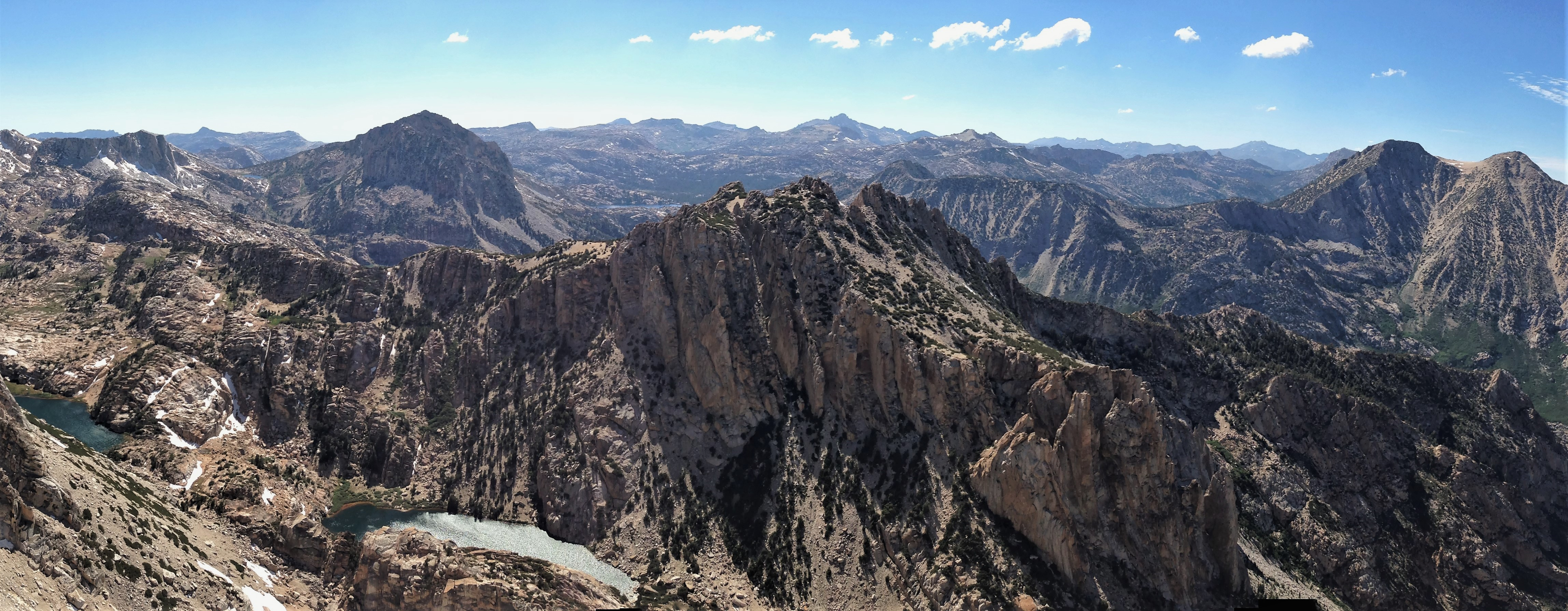
East aspect of Kettle Peak (centered) seen from The Incredible Hulk.
Crown Point (left) and Hunewill Peak (right).

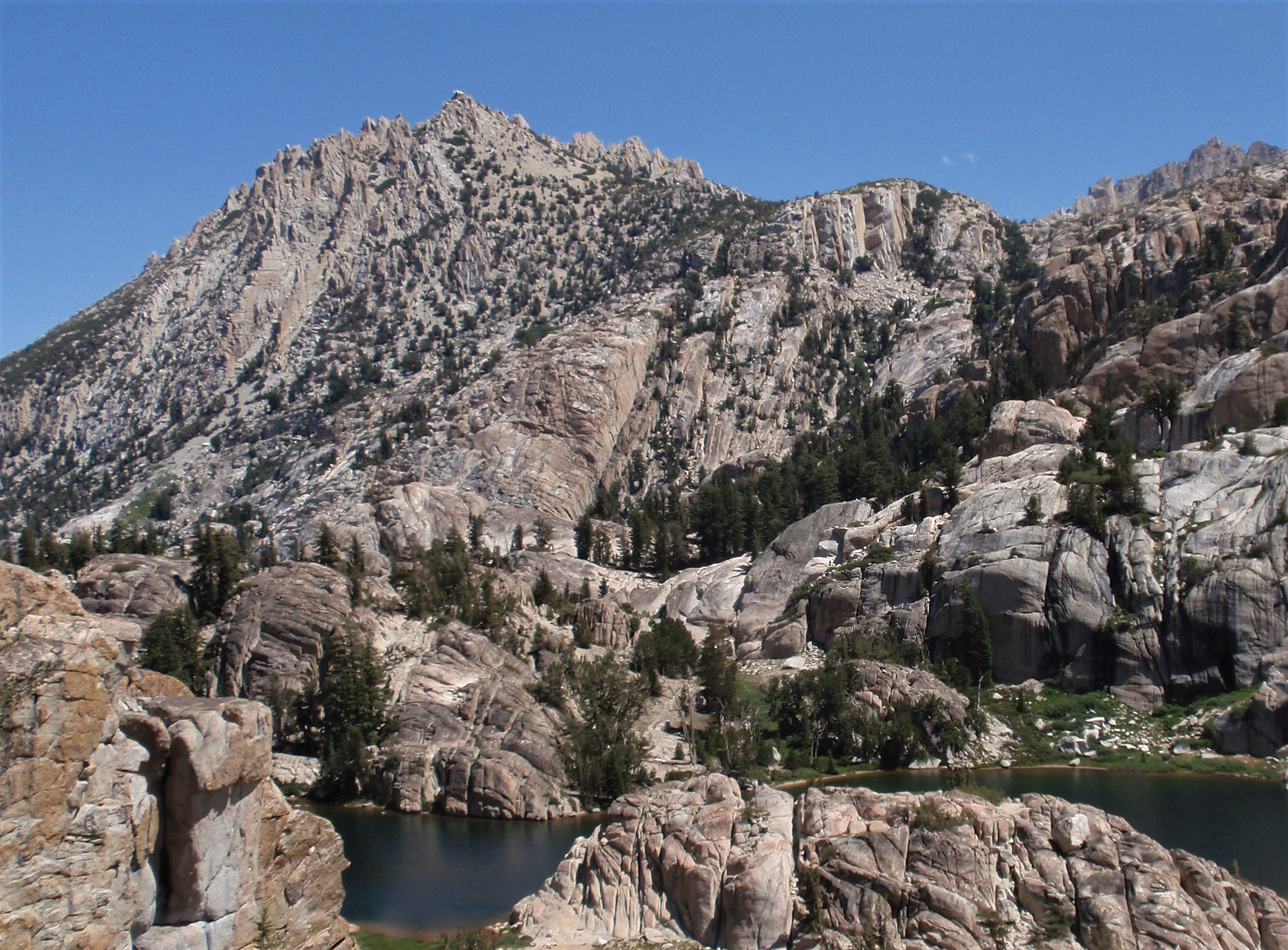
Kettle Peak seen from Crown Lake

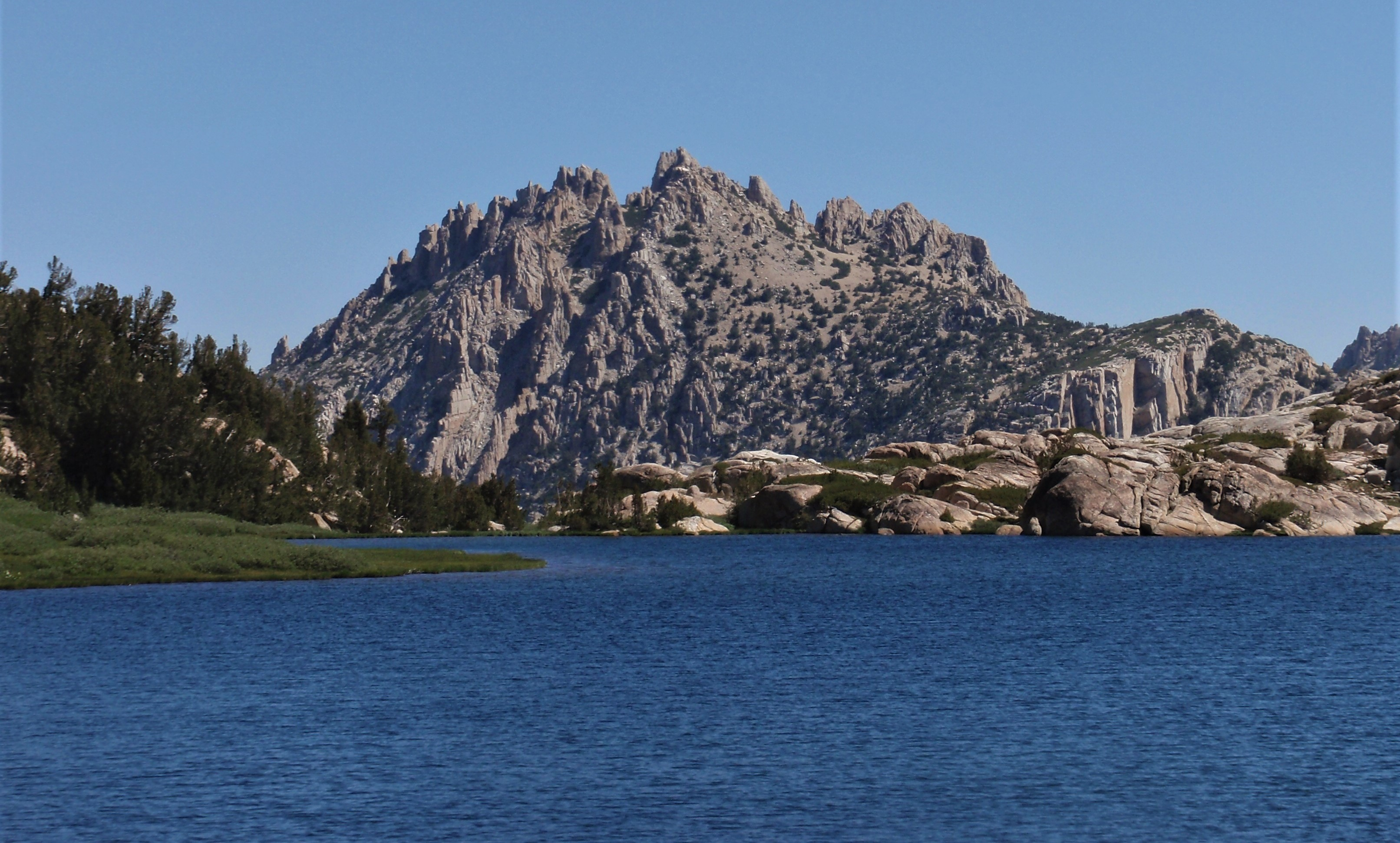
Snow Lake and Kettle Peak

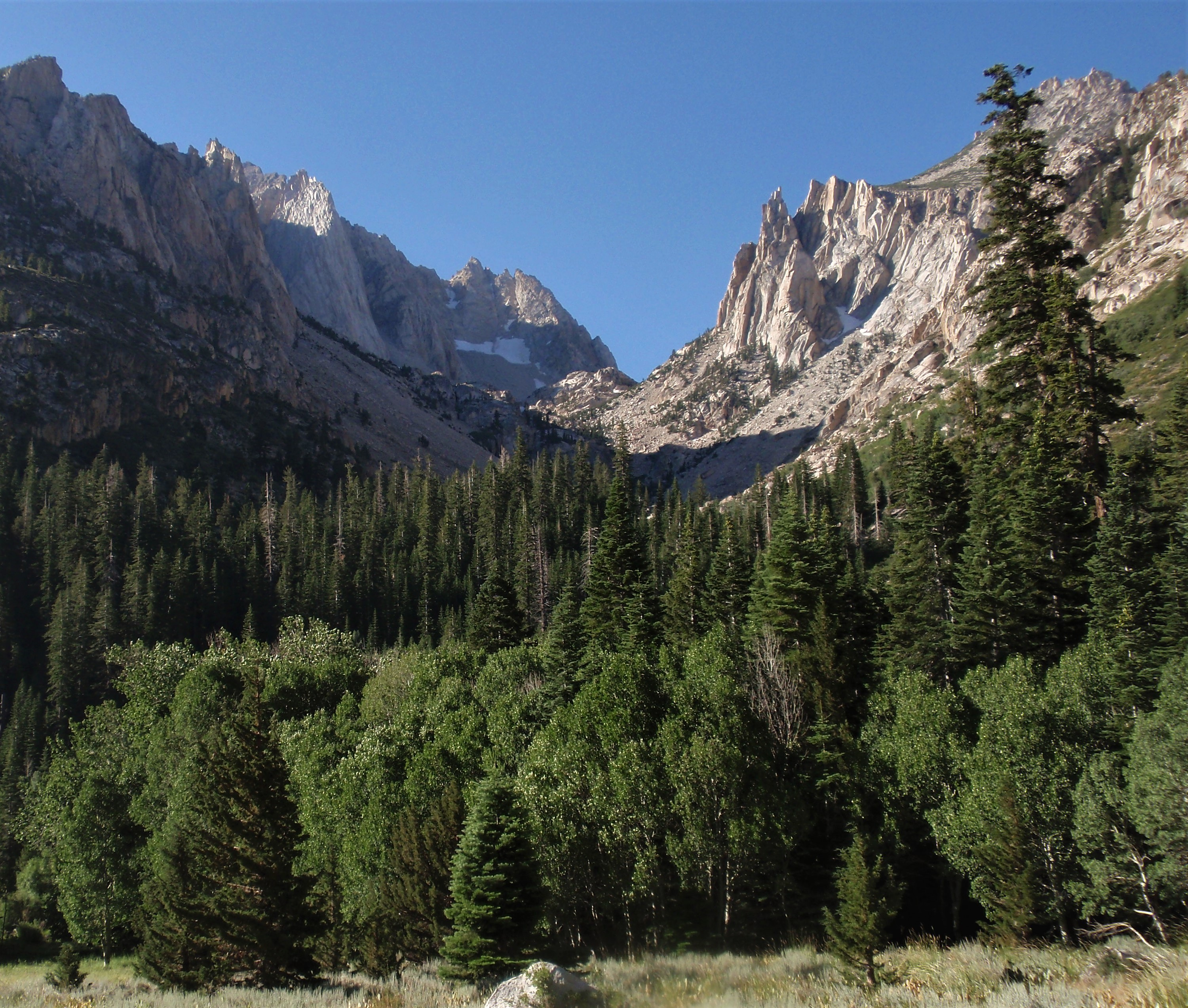
Little Slide Canyon with Incredible Hulk to left and Kettle Peak upper right

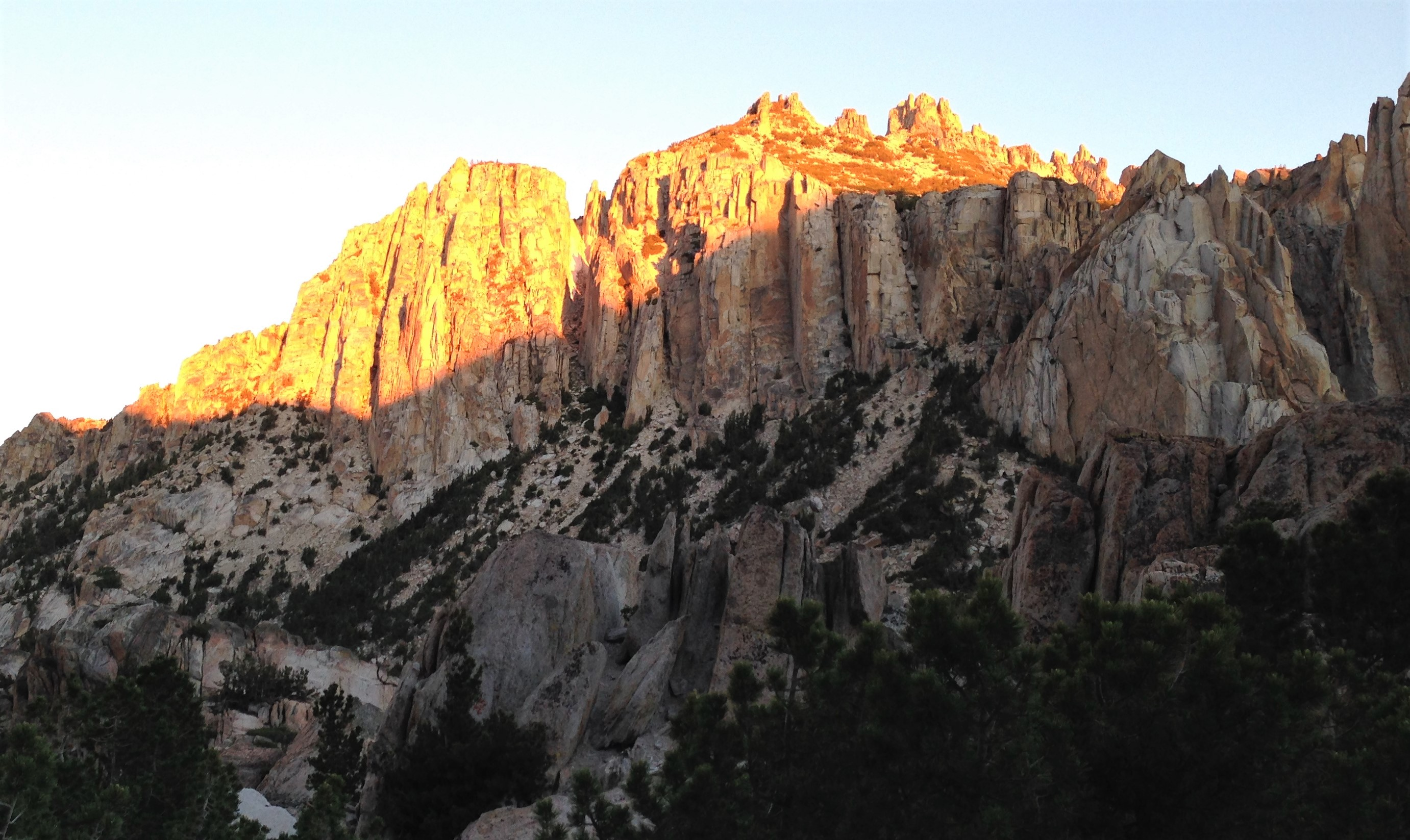
Kettle Peak seen from Little Slide Canyon at sunrise

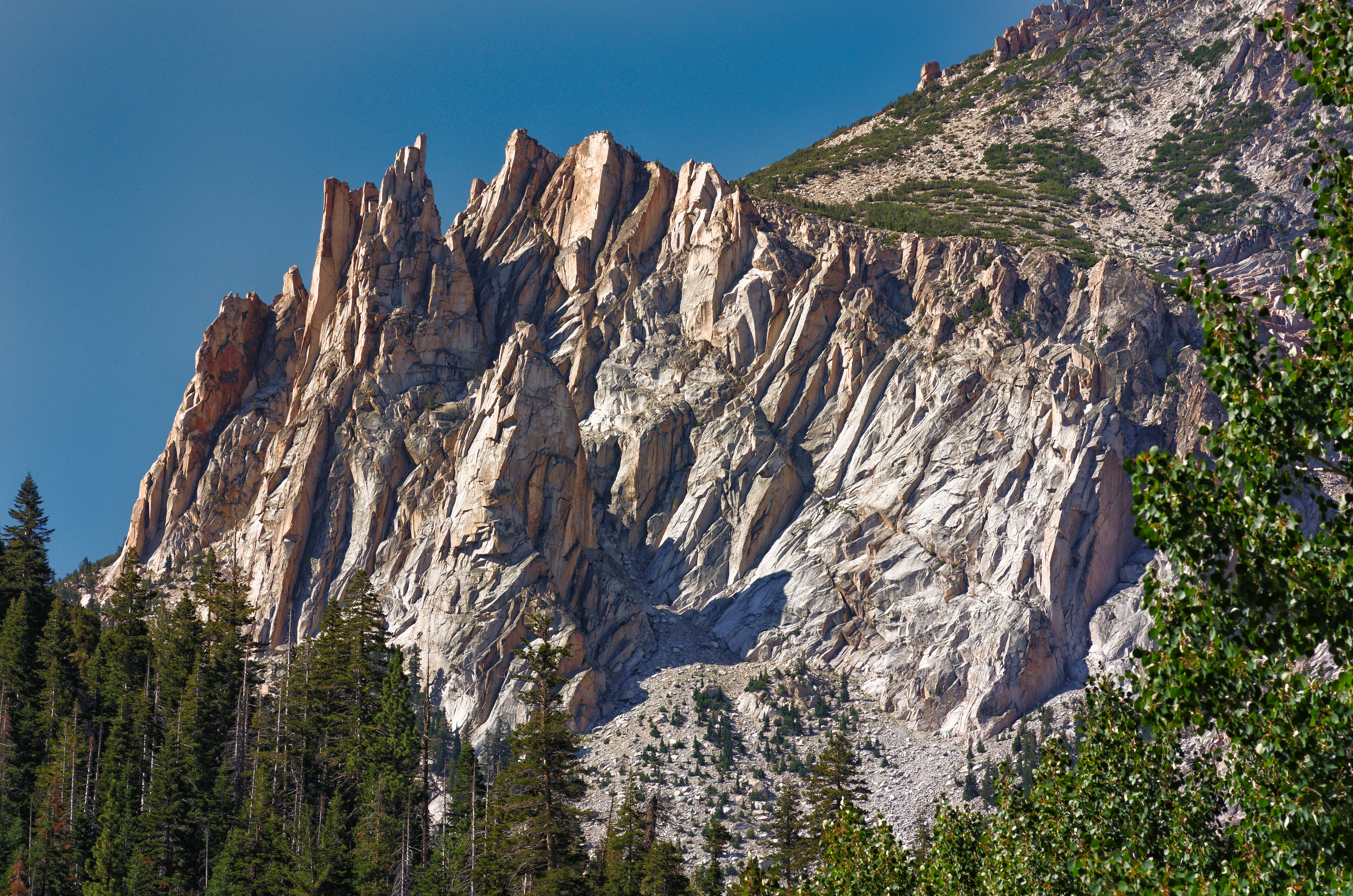
Spires on the northeast aspect of Kettle Peak. Unofficial names include "Outguard Spire", "The Turret", "Regge Pole", and "The Duck".
