= Peter Croft (climber) =

Canadian rock climber and mountaineer (born 1958)

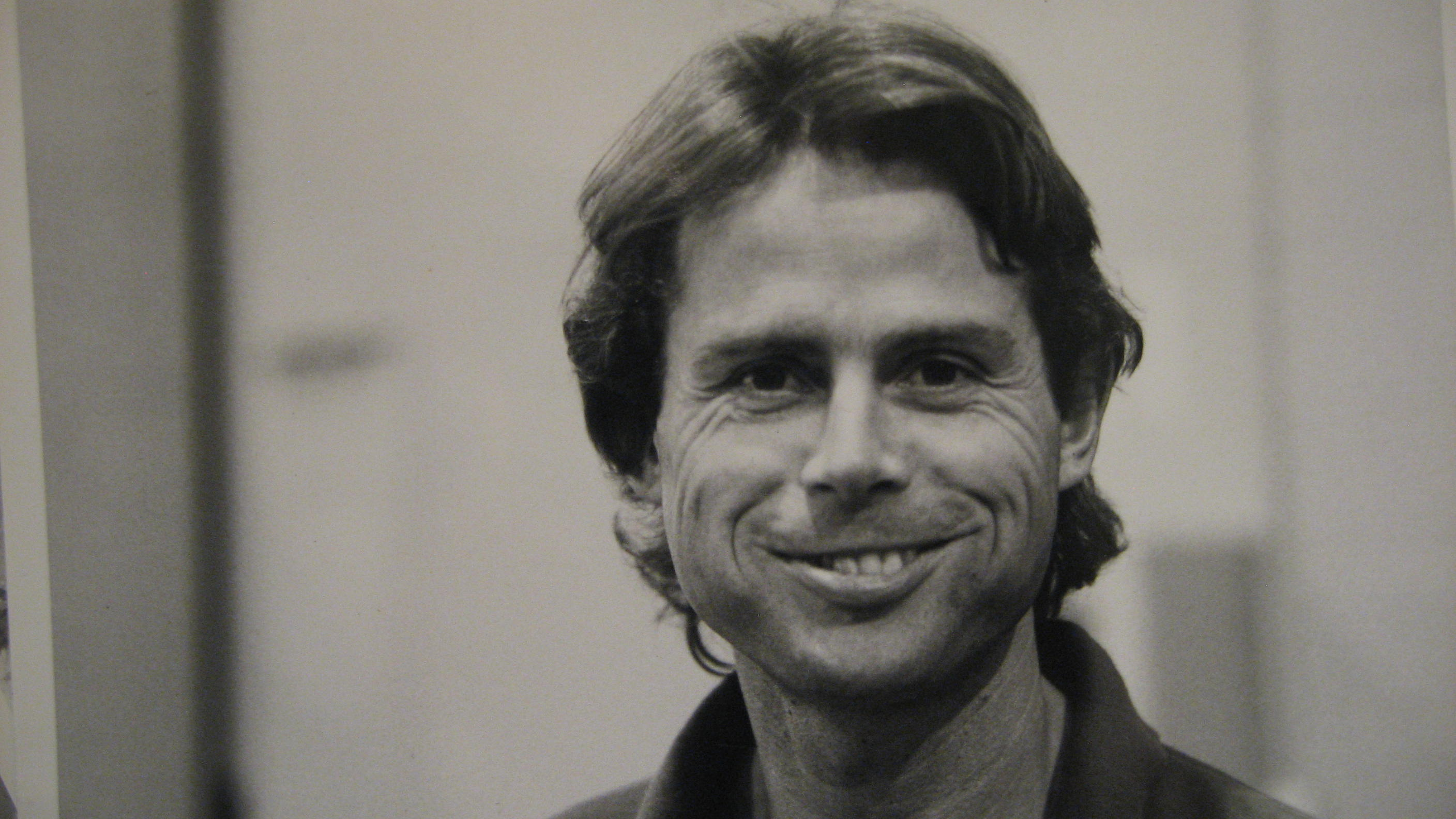
- Peter Croft in Salt Lake City, circa 1990

Personal information
- Born: May 18, 1958 (age 68) Nanaimo, British Columbia, Canada

Climbing career
- Type of climber: Traditional climbing; Big wall climbing; Free solo climbing
- Highest grade: Free solo: 5.11c (6c+)
- Known for: One of the first-ever multi-pitch free solo climbs at grade 5.11c (6c+)

Peter Croft (born May 18, 1958) is a Canadian rock climber and mountaineer, and early pioneer of free solo climbing of multi-pitch and big wall routes. He has concentrated much of his rock climbing career on big routes in Yosemite National Park, Squamish, British Columbia as well as the High Sierra. He received The American Alpine Club’s Robert & Miriam Underhill Award in 1991.

Croft listed The Evolution Traverse (YDS class 5.9 grade VI) which links Mount Mendel, Mount Darwin, Mount Haeckel, Mount Fiske, Mount Warlow and Mount Huxley as one of his favorite climbs in Fifty Favorite Climbs: The Ultimate North American Tick List.

Royal Robbins, a leading big wall climber of the previous generation, wrote about Croft and his climbing achievements in 2000: "Peter has been my hero for many years, ever since he came blazing out of nowhere with his stunning free solo ascent of Astroman on Washington Column in Yosemite. Tom Frost and I had made the second ascent of this route, mostly with direct aid in the early sixties. That one could climb this route without resorting to direct aid was impressive. To do it without a rope was astonishing. But such was Peter's level of mastery. That it was mastery, and not mere daring was proven by a string of free solos of similar stature, executed to perfection."

== Early life ==
Croft was born in Nanaimo, British Columbia on May 18, 1958. He grew up in Departure Bay, British Columbia where he was introduced to climbing. Speaking with Peter in the early 2000s at Joshua Tree, he was asked what got him into free solo climbing. Peter said he was so drawn to climbing that at the end of the day when his other buddies were done and into campfire activities, he needed more. With no partner it evolved into free solo climbing.

== Career highlights ==
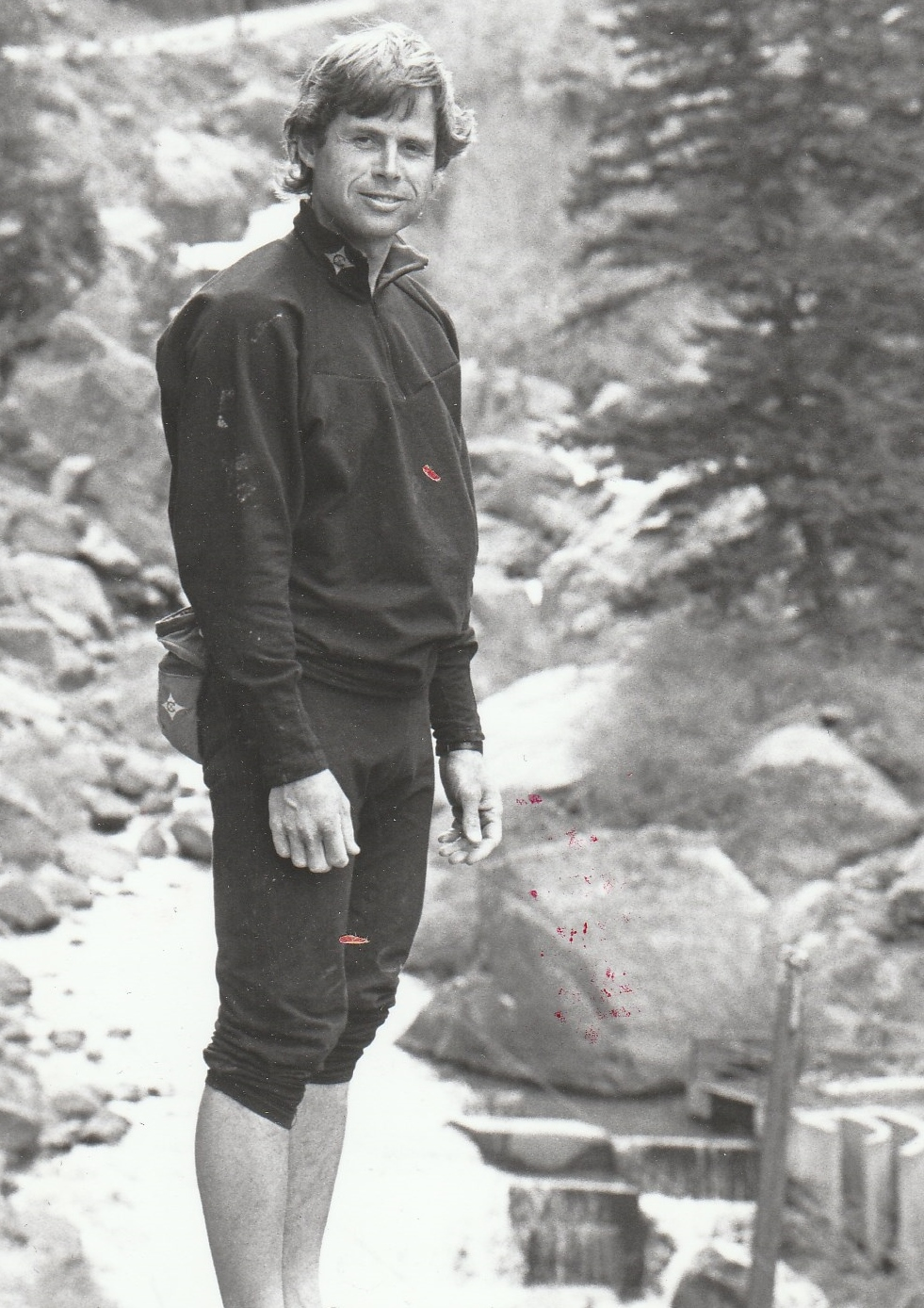
Peter Croft in Eldorado Canyon in the 1990s

Croft has completed a large number of first ascents including a number of free solo ascents.

- First ascent of Blowhard, 5.12+, on The Incredible Hulk, High Sierra, 2005
- First ascent of Samurai Warrior, 5.12a, High Sierra, 2005
- First ascent of Venturi Effect 5.12+, on The Incredible Hulk, High Sierra, 2004
- First ascent of Airstream 5.13, on The Incredible Hulk, High Sierra, 2004
- First ascent of the Evolution Traverse, High Sierra, 2000
- First ascent of Sponsar Brakk via 8,000-ft. rock route 5.11, Pakistan, 1998
- First solo and one-day Minaret Traverse, the Sierras, 1992
- First one-day link-up of the Nose and Salathé Wall on El Capitan, Yosemite, 1992
- First free ascent of Moonlight Buttress 5.12d/13a, 1991
- First free ascent of the Shadow 5.13a (7c+), onsight of crux pitch, 1988
- First free solo link-up of Astroman and the Rostrum, 1987
- First free solo of Astroman 5.11, 1987
- First free ascent of The Monument 5.12d, 1987 (onsight)
- First one-day link-up of the Nose of El Capitan and Half Dome, Yosemite, 1986
- First traverse of the Waddington Range, 1985
- First free solo of the Rostrum 5.11, Yosemite, 1985
- First free ascent of University Wall 5.12, Squamish, 1982

== Books authored by Croft ==
- Croft, Peter (July 2002). The Good, the Great, and the Awesome: The Top 40 High Sierra Rock Climbs. Maximus Pr. ISBN 0-9676116-4-4.
- Croft, Peter; Steve Boga (August 1996). Lightweight Alpine Climbing With Peter Croft (1st ed.). Stackpole Books. ISBN 0-8117-2841-2.
- Croft, Peter; Wynne Benti (2005-09-01). Climbing Mt. Whitney (3rd ed.). Spotted Dog Press Inc. ISBN 1-893343-14-6.
