= Twin Lakes, Mono County, California =

Twin Lakes
- Unincorporated community Census-designated place
- Location within California Location within the United States
- Coordinates: 38°9′56″N 119°19′36″W
- Country: United States
- State: California
- County: Mono

Area
  - Total: 5.22 sq mi (13.52 km^{2})
  - Land: 4.17 sq mi (10.80 km^{2})
  - Water: 1.05 sq mi (2.72 km^{2}) 20.1%
- Elevation: 7,090 ft (2,160 m)

Population (2020)
  - Total: 45
  - Density: 11/sq mi (4.2/km^{2})
- Time zone: UTC-8 (Pacific (PST))
  - Summer (DST): UTC-7 (PDT)
- ZIP Code: 93517 (Bridgeport)
- Area codes: 442/760
- FIPS code: 06-81048
- GNIS feature ID: 2804105

Twin Lakes is an unincorporated community and census-designated place (CDP) in Mono County, California, United States. It is located on the east side of the Sierra Nevada, encompassing the lakes of the same name and extending north down the outlet valley of Robinson Creek. The area is part of Toiyabe National Forest and is 10 miles (16 km) southwest of Bridgeport. It was first listed as a CDP for the 2020 census, with a population of 45.

Mono Village Resort is part of the community. The resort attracts hundreds of fishermen and outdoor enthusiasts every year.

The main tourist attraction of the settlement is the two lakes known as Twin Lakes. Both of these lakes are filled with water from Robinson's Creek which flows down from the top of the mountains and ends at the Bridgeport Reservoir. Both lakes have boat access and the Upper Twin allows for water sports. The area has trailheads for many backcountry hiking trails. The settlement is on the back side of Yosemite which makes it attractive to expert backpackers and horseback tours.

== Demographics ==
Historical population
Census	Pop.	Note	%±
2020	45		—
U.S. Decennial Census; 2010 2020

Twin Lakes first appeared as a census designated place in the 2020 U.S. census.

=== 2020 Census ===
Twin Lakes CDP (Mono County), California – Racial and ethnic composition Note: the US Census treats Hispanic/Latino as an ethnic category. This table excludes Latinos from the racial categories and assigns them to a separate category. Hispanics/Latinos may be of any race.
Race / Ethnicity (NH = Non-Hispanic)	Pop 2020	% 2020
White alone (NH)	40	88.89%
Black or African American alone (NH)	0	0.00%
Native American or Alaska Native alone (NH)	0	0.00%
Asian alone (NH)	0	0.00%
Pacific Islander alone (NH)	0	0.00%
Other race alone (NH)	0	0.00%
Mixed race or Multiracial (NH)	1	2.22%
Hispanic or Latino (any race)	4	8.89%
Total	45	100.00%

== Education ==
Twin Lakes is served by the Eastern Sierra Unified School District for grades PK-12.
