= Twin Lakes (Bridgeport, California) =

Pair of lakes in California, United States

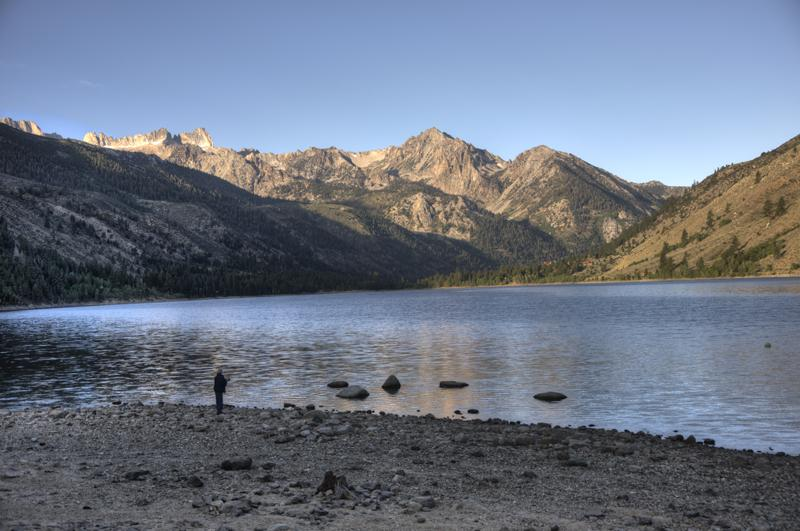

- Location within California Location within the United States
- Location: Mono County, California, United States
- Coordinates: 38°09′45″N 119°20′11″W
- Primary inflows: Cattle Creek, Robinson Creek, Tamarack Creek
- Primary outflows: Robinson Creek
- Surface elevation: 7,087 ft (2,160 m)
- Settlements: Bridgeport, California

Twin Lakes is a pair of lakes approximately 9 miles (14 km) southwest of the town of Bridgeport in Mono County, California. Mono Village and Twin Lakes resorts lie along the lakeside. The communities around the lake are part of the Twin Lakes census-designated place.

The lakes serve as the northern terminus of the Sierra High Route.

== See also ==
- List of lakes in California
