= Mono Basin =

Endorheic basin in California

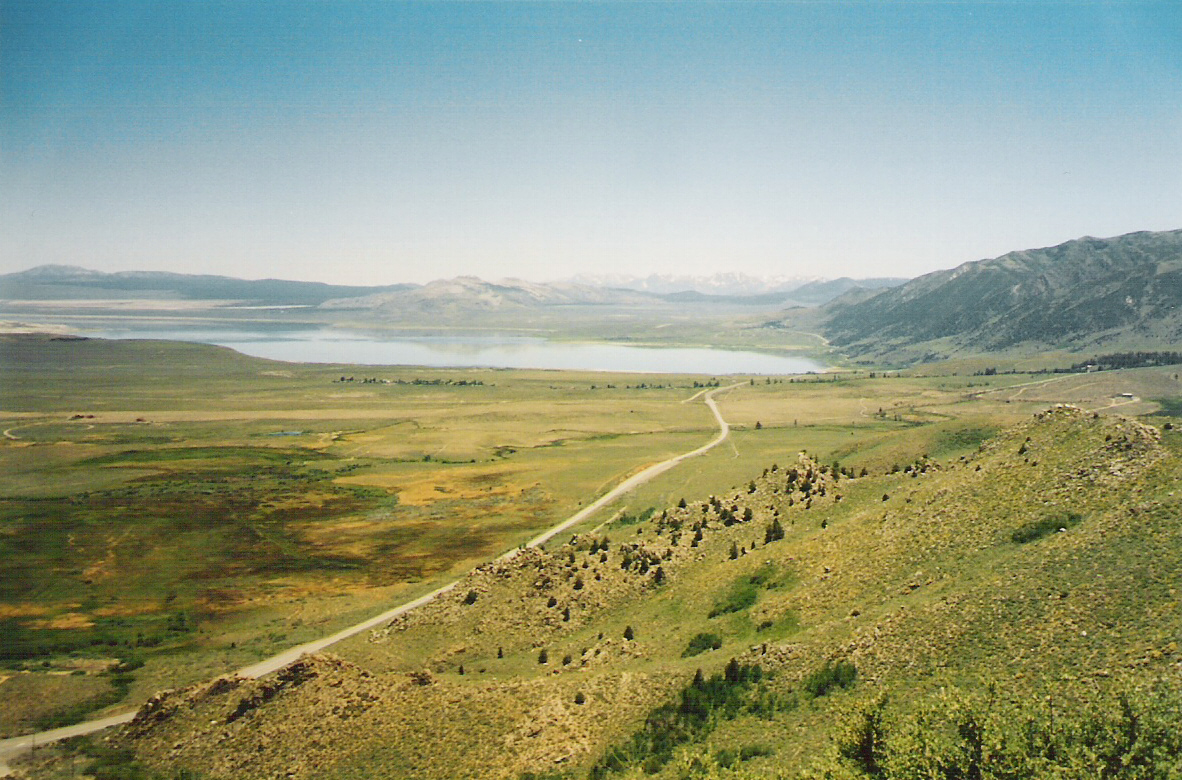
- Mono Basin from near Conway Summit, 2005.
- Floor elevation: 6,380 feet (1,940 m)
- Area: 631 to 801 square miles (1,630 to 2,070 km^{2})
- Depth: 6,680 feet (2,040 m)

Geography
- Location: Mono County, California, United States
- Borders on: W: Sierra Crest; N: Bodie Hills; E: Cowtrack Mountains; S: Long Valley Caldera
- Coordinates: 37°57′N 118°57′W
- Interactive map of Mono Basin

The Mono Basin is an endorheic drainage basin located east of Yosemite National Park in California and Nevada. It is bordered to the west by the Sierra Nevada, to the east by the Cowtrack Mountains, to the north by the Bodie Hills, and to the south by the north ridge of the Long Valley Caldera.

Estimates of the size of the basin range from 634 to 801 square miles, and the basin's elevation ranges from around 6,380 feet (level of Mono Lake as of 1986) to 13,061 feet atop Mount Dana near the Sierra Crest.

Notable features in the basin include Mono Lake and the Mono-Inyo Craters, as well as the town of Lee Vining.

== Geology ==
Geologically the basin is a structural basin that is bordered to the west by the frontal fault of the Sierra Nevada. The basin is part of the Walker Lane, an area where much of the deformation between the North American Plate and the Pacific Plate occurs.

The basin was formed by geological forces over the last five million years: basin and range crustal stretching and associated volcanism and faulting at the base of the Sierra Nevada.

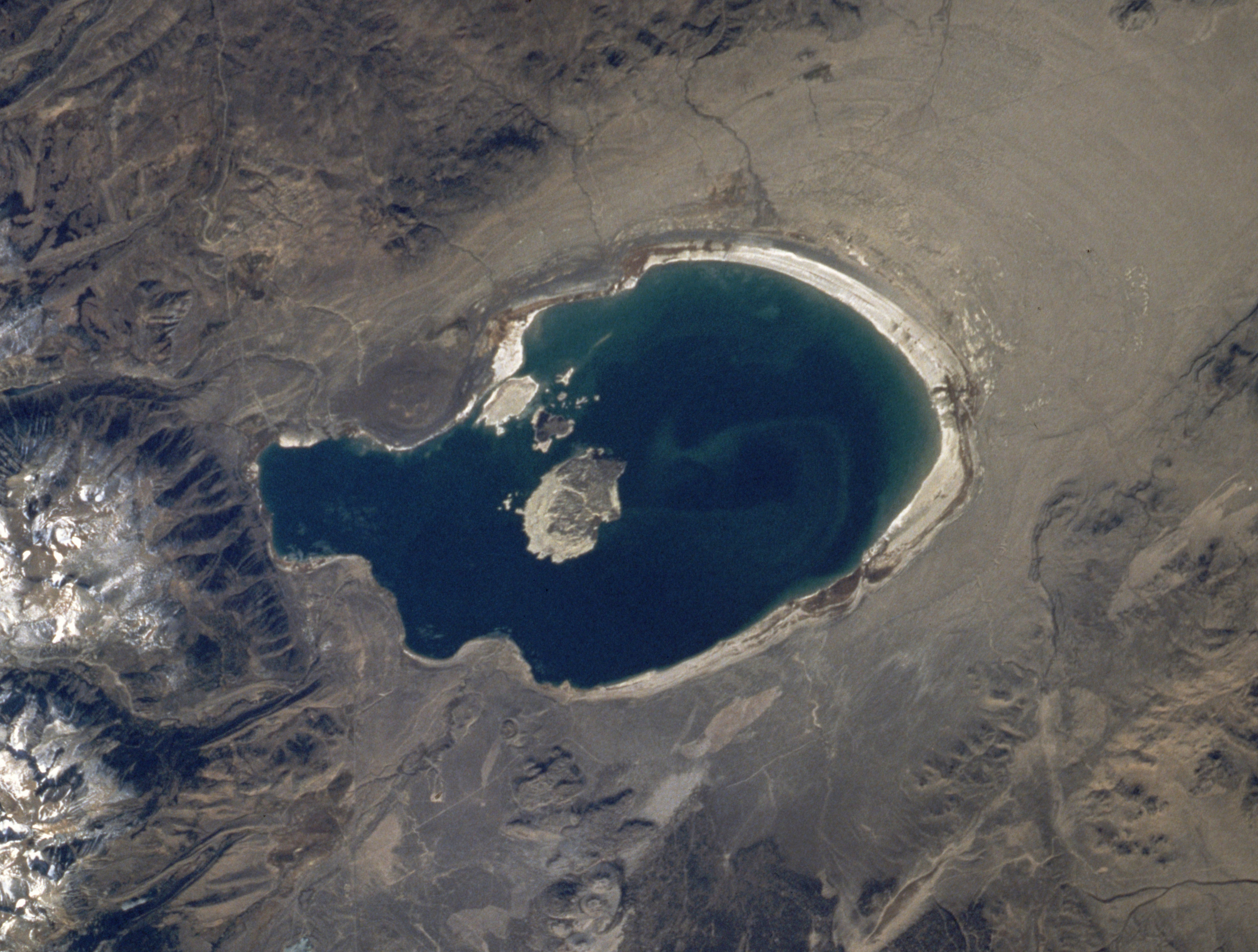
Image of Mono Lake from space, 1985

From 4.5 to 2.6 million years ago, large volumes of basalt were extruded around what is now Cowtrack Mountain (east and south of Mono Basin); eventually covering 300 square miles (780 km^{2}) and reaching a maximum thickness of 600 feet (180 m). Later volcanism in the area occurred 3.8 million to 250,000 years ago. This activity was northwest of Mono Basin and included the formation of Aurora Crater, Beauty Peak, Cedar Hill (later an island in the highest stands of Mono Lake), and Mount Hicks.

Lake Russell was the prehistoric predecessor to Mono Lake, during the Pleistocene. Its shoreline reached the modern-day elevation of 2,280 metres (7,480 ft), about 330 metres (1,100 ft) higher than the present-day lake. As of 1.6 million years ago, Lake Russell discharged to the northeast, into the Walker River drainage. After the Long Valley Caldera eruption 760,000 years ago, Lake Russell discharged into Adobe Lake to the southeast, then into the Owens River, and eventually into Lake Manly in Death Valley. Prominent shore lines of Lake Russell, called strandlines by geologists, can be seen west of Mono Lake.

Mono Basin is currently geologically active. Volcanic activity is related to the Mono-Inyo Craters: the most recent eruption occurred 350 years ago, resulting in the formation of Paoha Island. Panum Crater is an example of a combined rhyolite dome and cinder cone.

== See also ==
- Mono Basin National Scenic Area
