= Negit Island =

Island in Mono County, California, United States

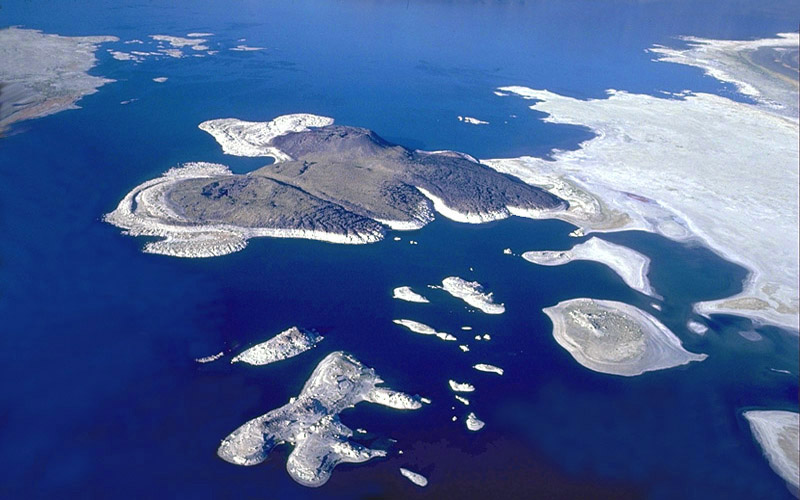
- Aerial photo of Negit Island. As of 2004, the land bridge shown in the photo has submerged.
- Interactive map of Negit Island

Geography
- Location: Mono Lake, Mono County, California
- Coordinates: 38°01′N 119°03′W
- Highest elevation: 6,522 ft (1987.9 m); 141 ft (43 m) above the 2004 lake level.

Administration
- United States

Negit Island is an island in Mono Lake. Negit (along with nearby Paoha Island) is a volcanic cone less than 2000 years old. It can be considered to be the northernmost of the Mono Craters. Negit is composed of three dark dacite lava flows.

Historically, Negit served as an important nesting ground for California gulls. However, the fall of the lake level since 1941 created a land bridge to the island, which first appeared in 1977. An attempt at blasting out the land bridge failed to be a long-term fix. The land bridge permitted predators, especially coyotes, to raid the bird eggs and nests on the island. Surveys done from 1976 to 1978 reported that 38,000 California gulls nested on Negit Island annually; this number was reported to be greatly reduced in 1979. Officials with the Los Angeles Department of Water and Power attributed the decline in the gull population to the gulls choosing other locations to nest, while environmental groups believed that even accounting for gulls nesting elsewhere, the overall gull population had decreased significantly. After 1979, the gulls generally avoided Negit Island and moved to nest in islets off its north shore.

Negit Island is accessible by boats (commonly kayaks). However, the island is off-limits from April 1 through August 1, to protect the nesting gulls.

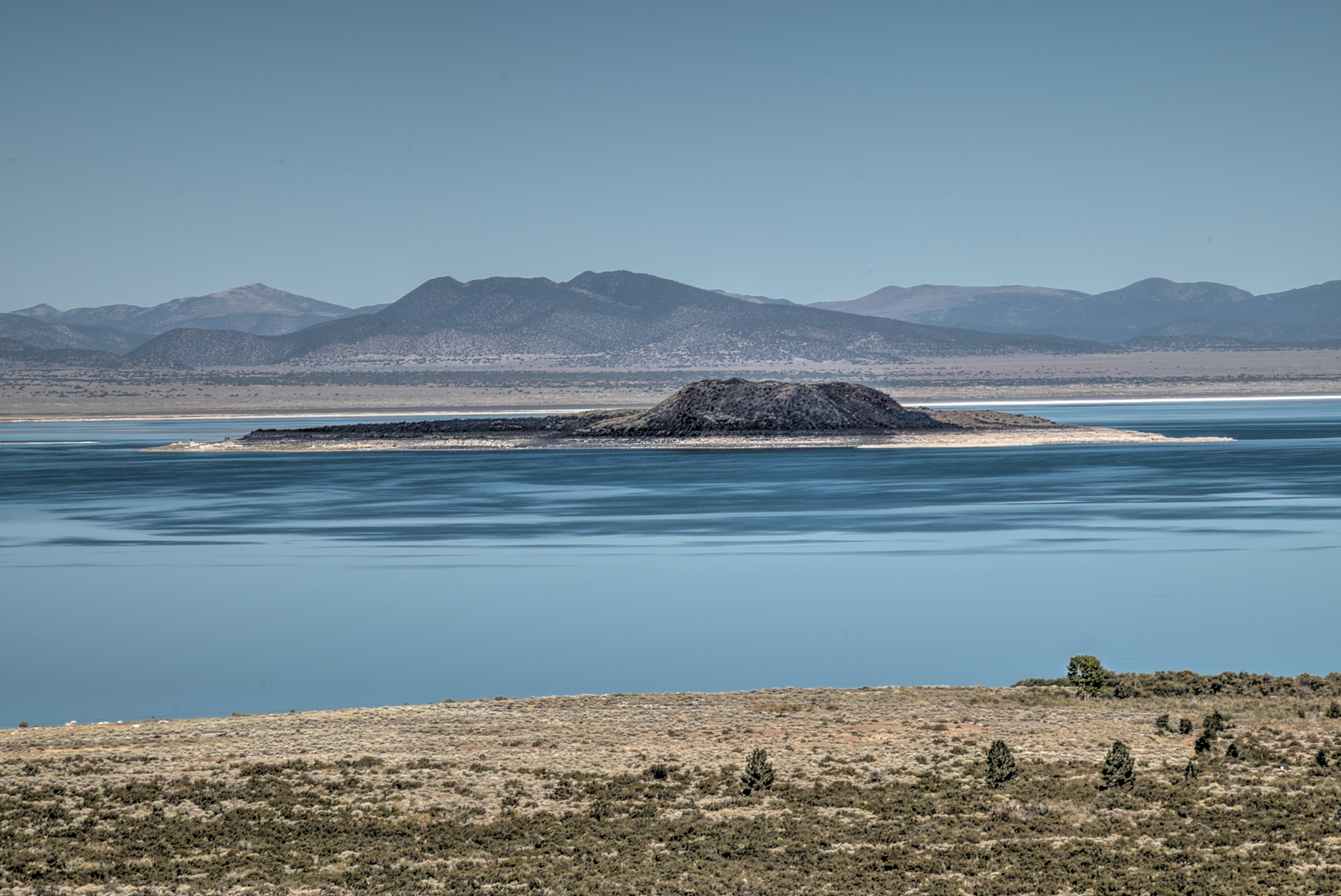

== See also ==
- Mono Lake Tufa State Reserve
- Mono Basin National Scenic Area
- List of islands of California
