= Red Cones =

Pair of cinder cones near Devils Postpile National Monument, California, United States

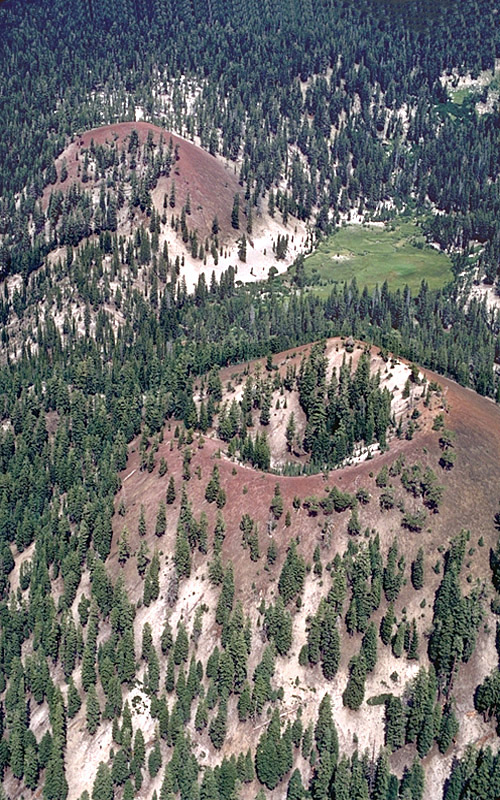
- Close aerial view of the Red Cones toward the east-northeast. During eruption of both cones, lava poured through the breaches and spilled to the left.

Highest point
- Elevation: 8,960 ft (2,730 m)
- Coordinates: 37°35′19″N 119°03′28″W

Geography
- Location: Madera County, California, United States

Geology
- Rock age: 8500 years
- Mountain type: Cinder cone
- Last eruption: 5000 years ago

The Red Cones are a pair of cinder cones near Devils Postpile National Monument, in eastern Madera County of central California. They are within the eastern Sierra Nevada and Inyo National Forest.

== Volcanic geology ==
The Red Cones last erupted approximately 5000 years ago, with both cinder eruption (forming the cones), and a basalt flow from the southern cone, which flowed approximately 1.5 kilometers (0.9 mi) towards the upper Middle Fork of the San Joaquin River.

The Red Cones are at the southern end of the Mono-Inyo Craters, the magma for the Red Cones shares its origin with the other Mono-Inyo craters.

== See also ==
- Long Valley caldera
- Panum Crater
