= Lake Russell (prehistoric) =

Former lake in California and Nevada, United States

Coordinates: 38°00′N 119°00′W

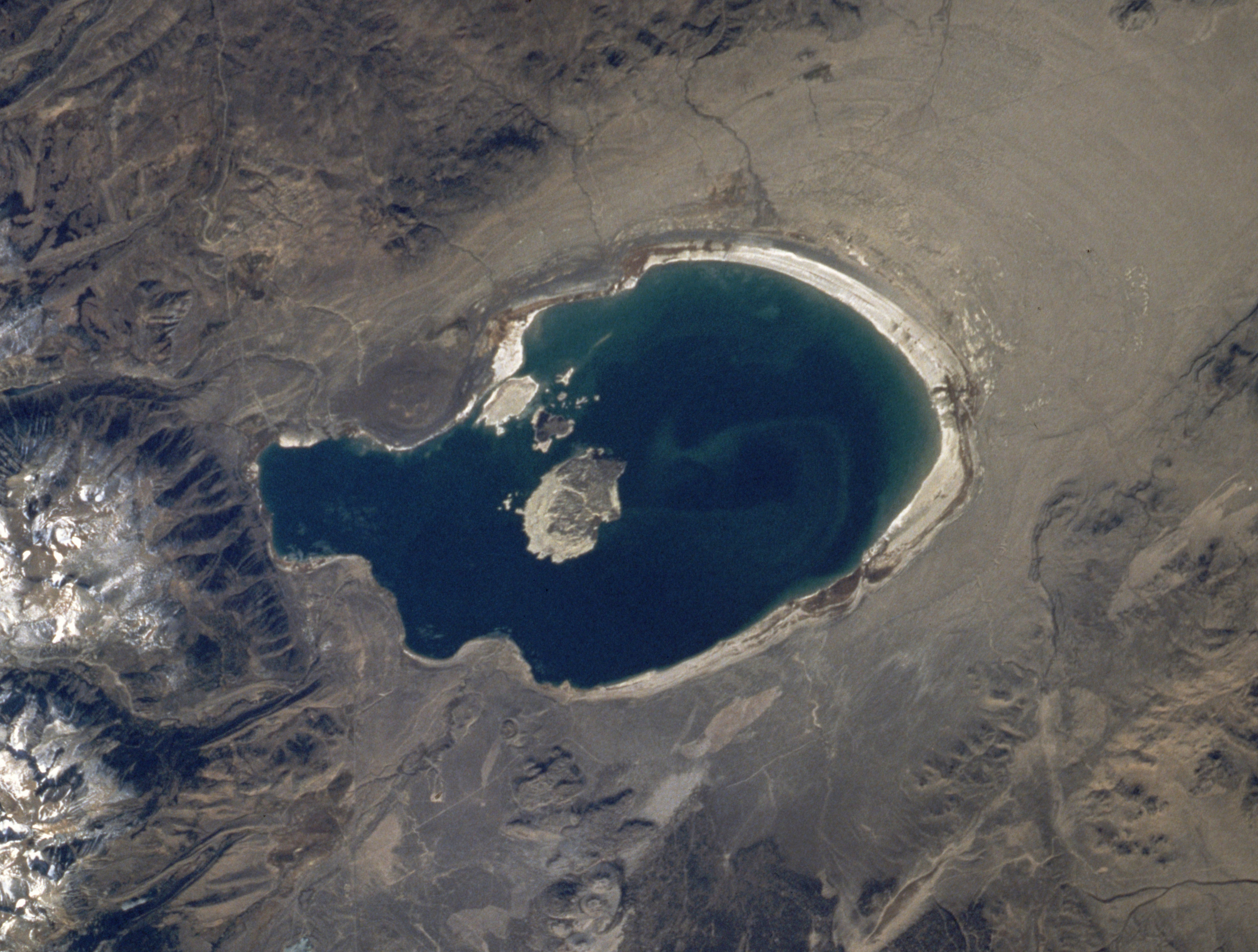
Present-day Mono Lake

Lake Russell is a former lake stage of Mono Lake. It was named in honour of Israel Russell, but is also known as Lake Mono in contrast to the present-day lake. This lake was larger than present-day Mono Lake and occasionally overflowed first into the East Walker River and later into the Owens River. During its existence, glaciers from the Sierra Nevada reached to its shore.

== Geography and geomorphology ==
The lake was larger than present-day Mono Lake, especially in the east where it extended as far as the California-Nevada border and farther. There the land is lower and some valleys could operate as overflow sills during different epochs. The lake was periodically impacted by volcanic eruptions, which deposited the Wilson Creek Formation as a combined volcanic-lake sediment formation. Some volcanoes grew in the lake waters.

Tectonically, the Mono Lake basin started forming 4–3 million years ago mostly in response to subsidence along the Sierra Nevada Fault.

=== Inflow ===
Lee Vining Creek, Mill Creek and Rush Creek originate in the Sierra Nevada and form the principal inflow of Mono Lake and former Lake Russell. At the time of Lake Russell, June Lake overflowed into the lake.

=== Glaciers ===
During glacial stages, glaciers along Lee Vining Creek, Mill Creek and Rush Creek extended farther down and into Lake Russell. Thus, their moraines were subject to wave erosion by the waters of Lake Russell. These moraines record various pulses of lake and glacier growth and shrinkage. Evidence indicates that at least the Tioga stage glaciation coincided with a lake highstand.

=== Overflow ===
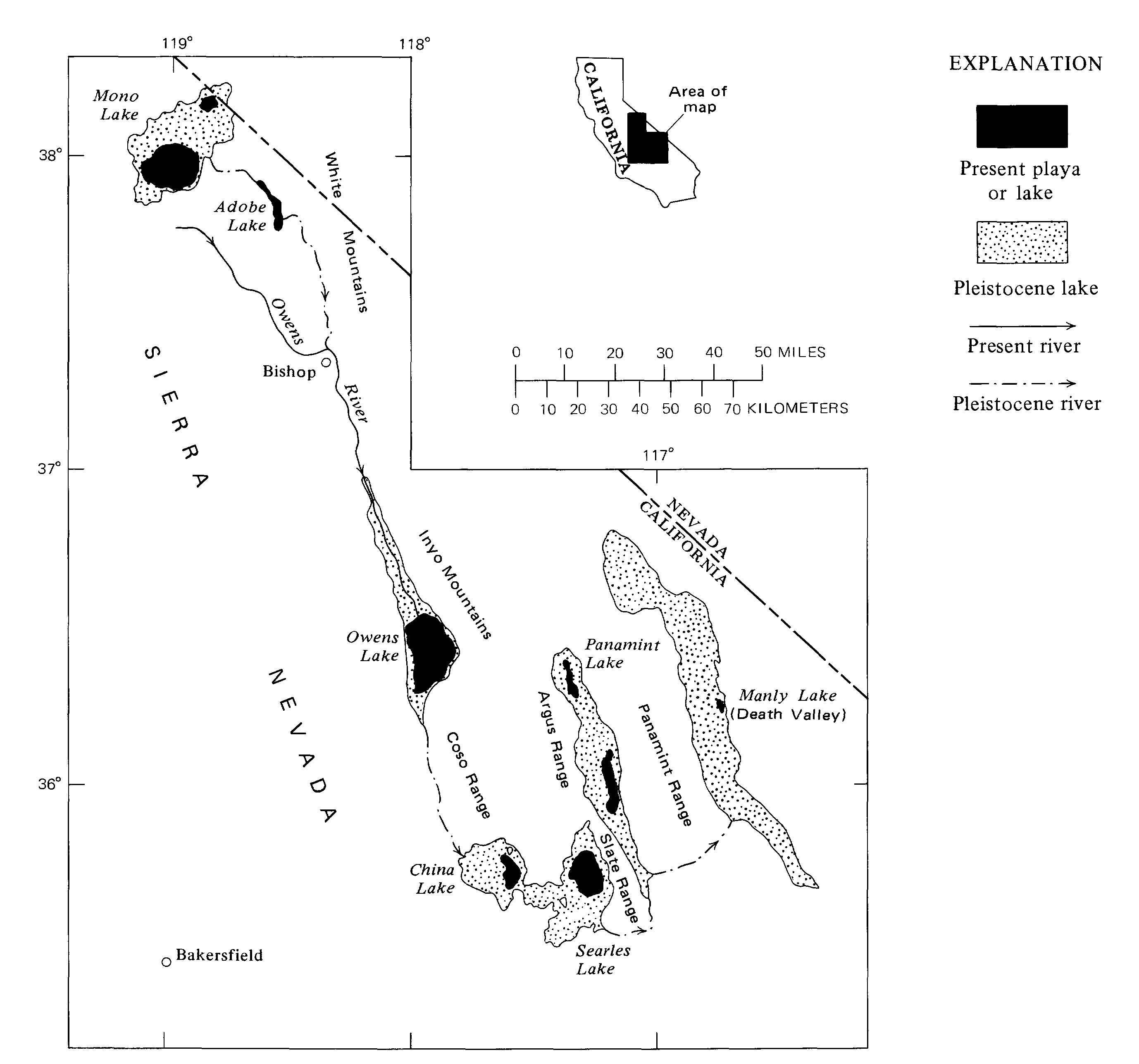
The enlarged Owens River

During highstands, Lake Russell overflowed through the Adobe Valley into Owens Valley. This outflow path formed a narrow inset into the south-eastern shorelines of Lake Russell, and proceeded through a fault-influenced zone with several basins first into Lake Adobe and then through a narrow valley in the Benton Mountains in the Benton Valley arm of Owens Valley. This overflow is biogeographically important, as it connected Lake Russell via the Owens River to Owens Lake, Searles Lake, Panamint Lake and Lake Manly in Death Valley. Overflow along this pathway however did not occur very frequently; it is further possible that the eruption of the Bishop Tuff of Long Valley Caldera prompted a catastrophic flood through the Adobe Valley overflow path into Owens Valley.

The overflow channel was not always located at Adobe Valley, however; a more northerly spillway existed until faulting and volcanism shifted the overflow sill towards Adobe Valley. The northerly "Mount Hicks spillway" is presently 47 metres (154 ft) higher than the Adobe Valley sill, and passes between the Bodie Hills and the Wassuk Range into Mud Spring Canyon, Rough Creek and eventually East Walker River. This change in spillways is biologically important, as it allowed animals to use Lake Russell as a "transfer point" between different drainages.

== Lake level history ==
During the Tahoe glaciation (150,000–130,000 years ago, oxygen isotope stage 6), Lake Russell reached a highstand and overflowed into Owens Valley. During such overflow, the lake levels stabilized at c. 2,205 metres (7,234 ft) elevation.

During oxygen isotope stage 2 and possibly late stage 3, water levels reached a lower highstand of 2,152–2,161 metres (7,060–7,090 ft) above sea level. This stage caused the formation of wavecut terraces in moraines of Tioga and Tahoe stage. The shorelines from this lake stage are better preserved. Intermediate stands reached elevations of 2,035 metres (6,677 ft) and 2,095 metres (6,873 ft). Based on radiocarbon dating and other methods, this latest highstand commenced starting from 36,000 years before present and reached two distinct high points between 21,000 and 35,000 years before present and 15,000 and 13,000 years before present. After 10,000 years before present lake levels were low.

== Lake deposits ==
Sandy beach deposits, lacustrine deposits and ooliths and tufa were deposited by Lake Russell, many of these lacustrine formations are known as the Wilson Creek beds. Furthermore, as lake levels dropped thinolite was deposited in the lake, where calcium-rich groundwater emerged into the lake. Pumice and tephra shards are also found within lake deposits and may originate in the Mono Craters. The Mono-Inyo Craters formed in part after the retreat of Lake Russell, thus their deposits are not heavily modified by lacustrine phenomena.

Deltaic landforms also exist at Lake Russell and formed during times where the lake levels were stable; the town of Lee Vining is constructed on such a delta.

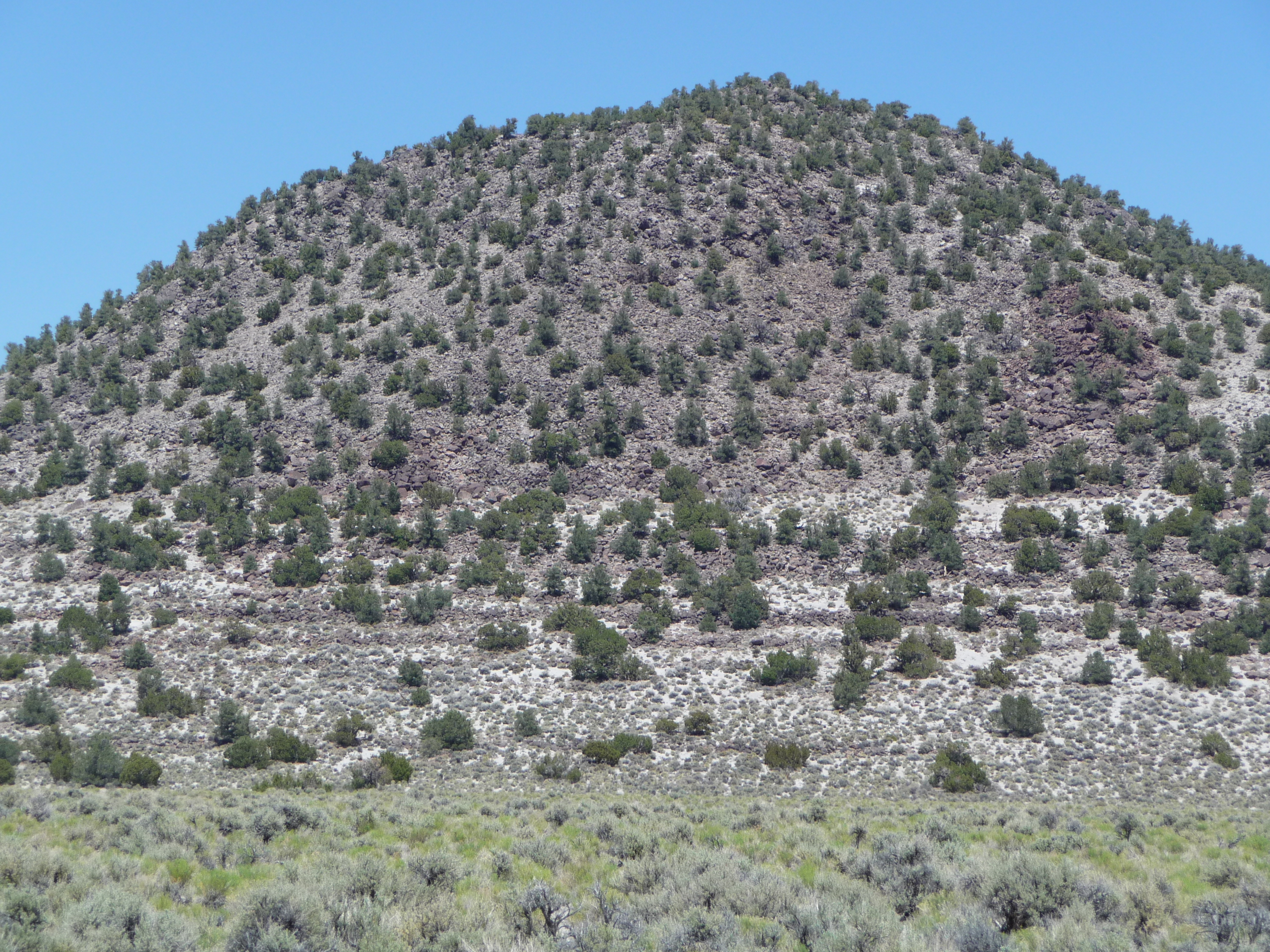
Strandlines of Lake Russell

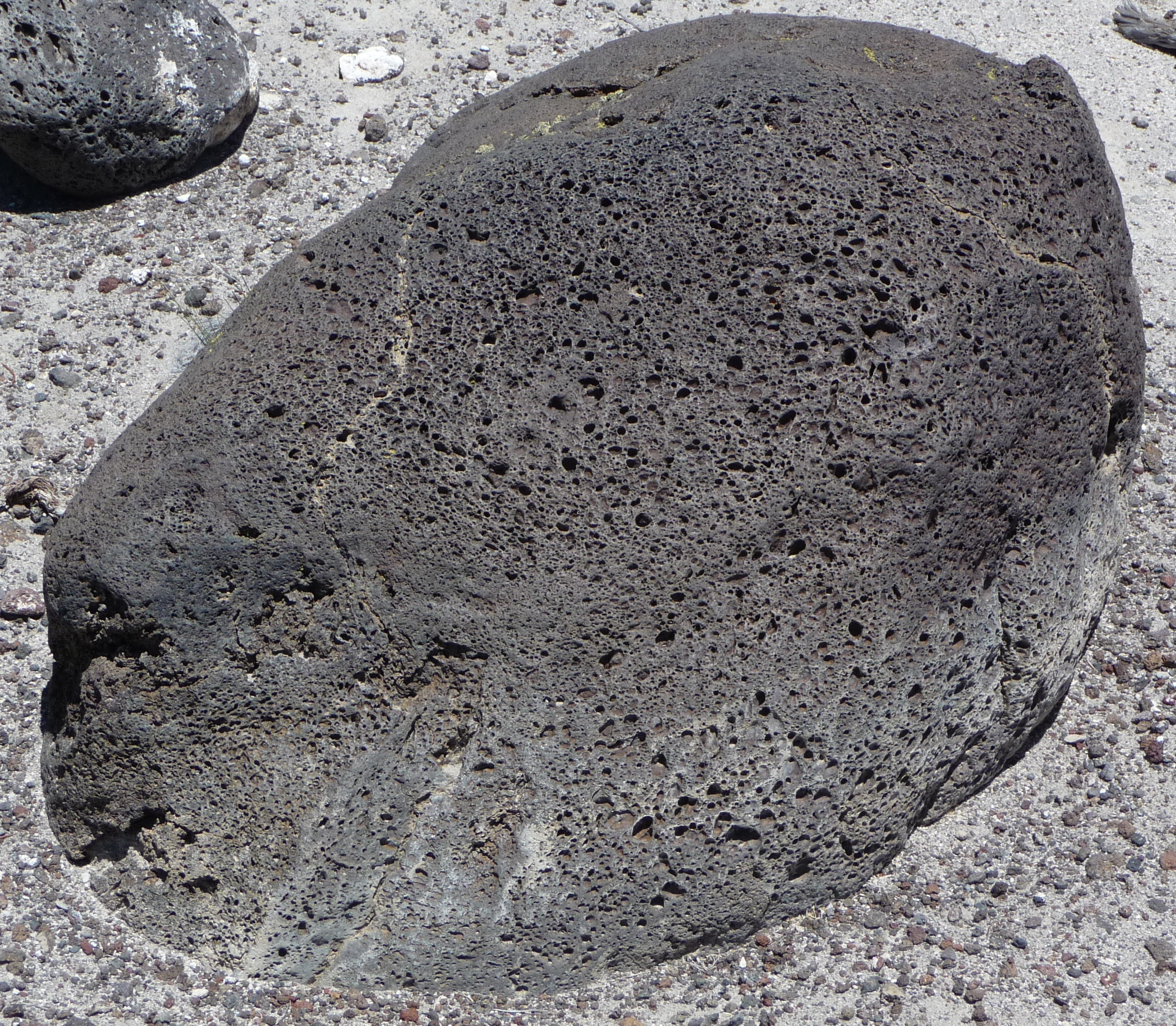
A boulder of Lake Russell

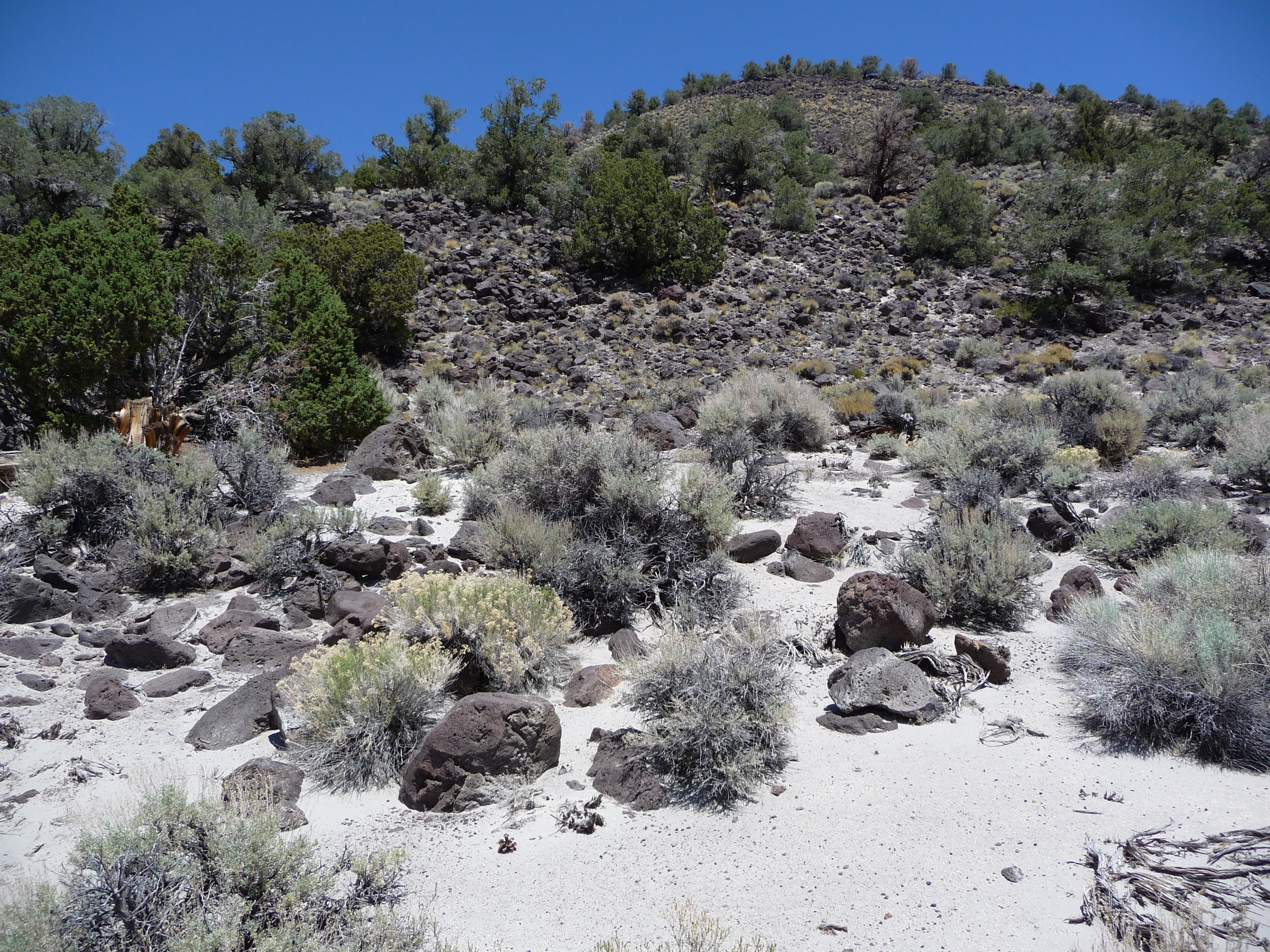
A wavecut platform of Lake Russell

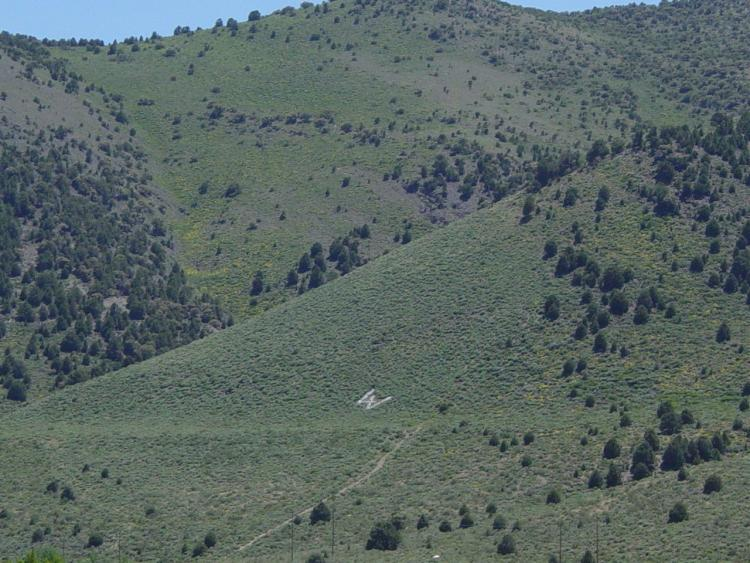
Shorelines close to Lee Vining

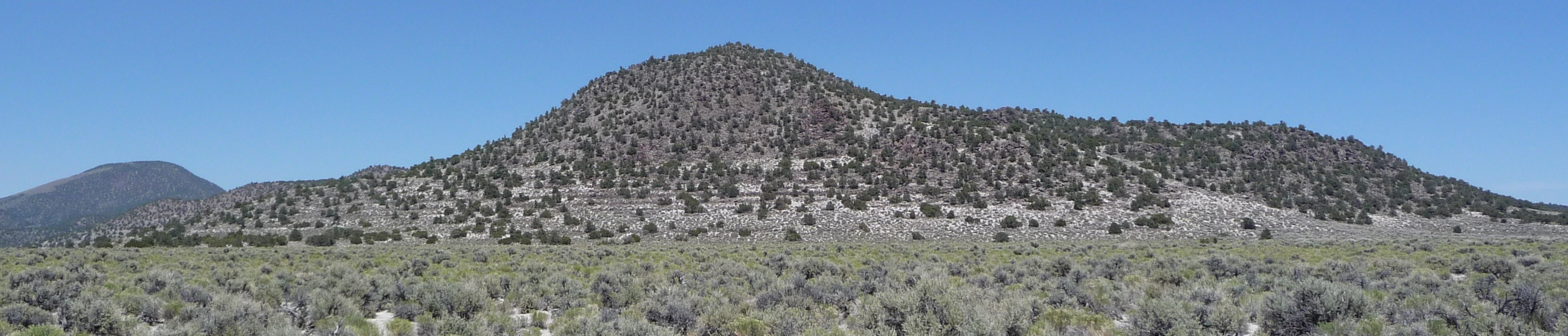
Wavecut platform and shorelines

== Biology ==
Species found include the bivalve Helisoma newberri, bivalve Ragia lecontei (also found in the Salton Trough), Pisidium bivalve taxa, Sphaerium bivalve taxa, the gastropods Amnicola longinqua, Valvata humeralis, Vorticifex effusa and Vorticifex gesteri. The Ragia bivalves are marine species and were probably transported to Lake Russell by birds as has been observed at other inland locations in the United States.

Fish of the Catostomus, Chasmistes, Oncorhynchus clarkii, Prosopium and Ptychocheilus genera and molluscs may have been propagated between the Owens River system and the Lake Lahontan system through Lake Russell.

== Sources ==
- Benson, L. V.; Currey, D. R.; Dorn, R. I.; Lajoie, K. R.; Oviatt, C. G.; Robinson, S. W.; Smith, G. I.; Stine, S. (1990-06-01). "Chronology of expansion and contraction of four great Basin lake systems during the past 35,000 years". Palaeogeography, Palaeoclimatology, Palaeoecology. 78 (3): 241–286. Bibcode:1990PPP....78..241B. doi:10.1016/0031-0182(90)90217-U.
- Hershler, Robert; Jayko, Angela S. (2009-05-01). "A Mactrid Bivalve from Pleistocene Deposits of Lake Russell, Mono Basin, California". Journal of Paleontology. 83 (3): 496–499. Bibcode:2009JPal...83..496H. doi:10.1666/08-132.1. ISSN 0022-3360. S2CID 131678875.
- Putnam, William C. (1949-08-01). "Quaternary Geology of the June Lake District, California". Geological Society of America Bulletin. 60 (8): 1281–1302. doi:10.1130/0016-7606(1949)60[1281:QGOTJL]2.0.CO;2. ISSN 0016-7606.
- Putnam, William C. (1950-02-01). "Moraine and Shoreline Relationships at Mono Lake, California". Geological Society of America Bulletin. 61 (2): 115–122. doi:10.1130/0016-7606(1950)61[115:MASRAM]2.0.CO;2. ISSN 0016-7606.
- Reheis, Marith C.; Stine, Scott; Sarna-Wojcicki, Andrei M. (2002-08-01). "Drainage reversals in Mono Basin during the late Pliocene and Pleistocene". Geological Society of America Bulletin. 114 (8): 991–1006. Bibcode:2002GSAB..114..991R. doi:10.1130/0016-7606(2002)114<0991:DRIMBD>2.0.CO;2.
- Whiticar, Michael J.; Suess, Erwin (1998-09-01). "The Cold Carbonate Connection Between Mono Lake, Californiaand the Bransfield Strait, Antarctica". Aquatic Geochemistry. 4 (3–4): 429–454. doi:10.1023/A:1009696617671. ISSN 1380-6165. S2CID 130488236.
- Yang, Qingyuan; Bursik, Marcus; Pouget, Solène (1 April 2019). "Stratigraphic and sedimentologic framework for tephras in the Wilson Creek Formation, Mono Basin, California, USA". Journal of Volcanology and Geothermal Research. 374: 197–225. arXiv:1806.02830. Bibcode:2019JVGR..374..197Y. doi:10.1016/j.jvolgeores.2019.02.007. ISSN 0377-0273. S2CID 119092674.
