= Mono Lake Tufa State Natural Reserve =

Natural reserve in California, United States

- IUCN category V (protected landscape/seascape)
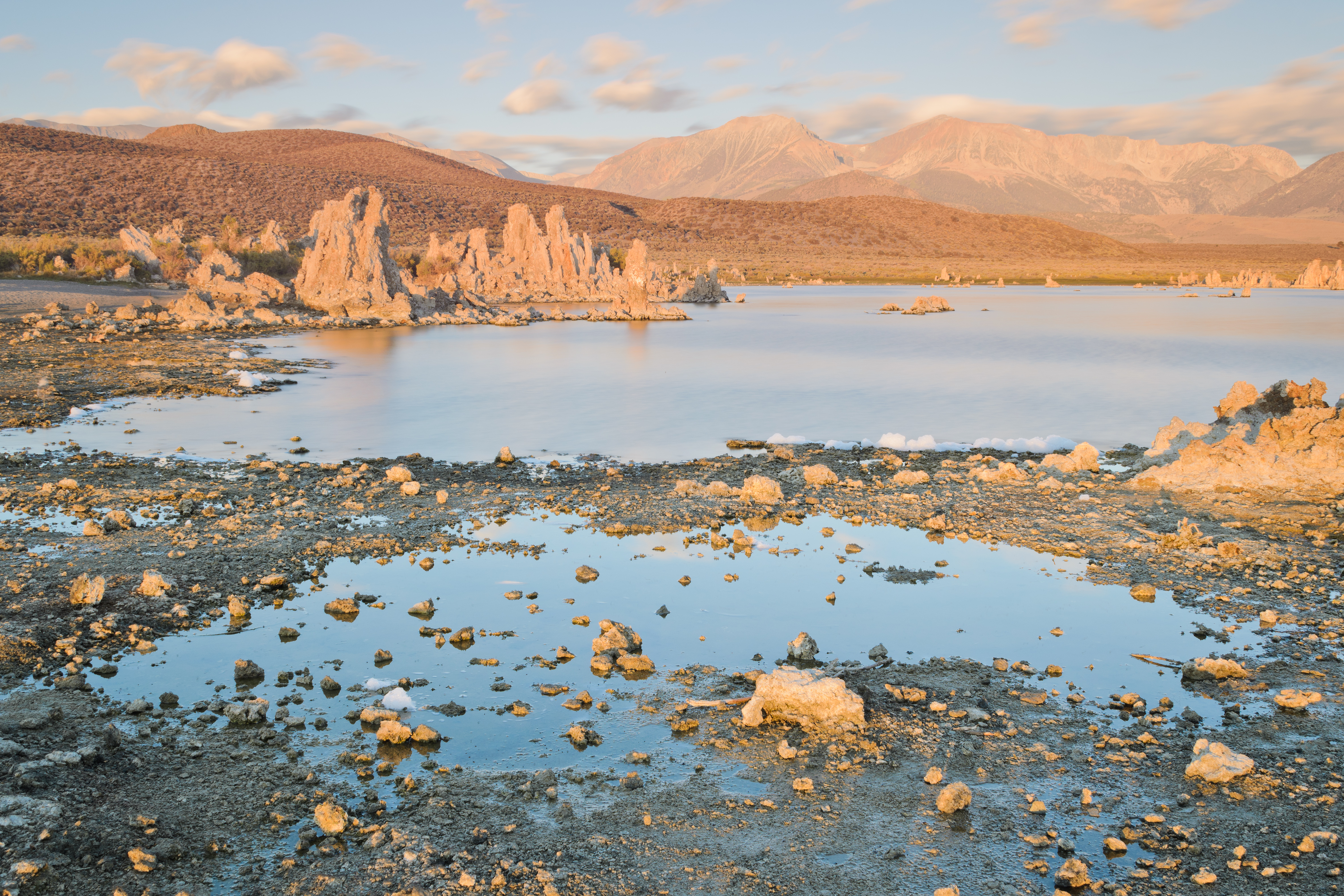
- Mono Lake's "South Tufa" area

- Location within California Location within the United States
- Location: Mono County, United States
- Nearest city: Lee Vining, California
- Coordinates: 37°56′43″N 119°2′8″W
- Established: 1984
- Governing body: California Department of Parks and Recreation

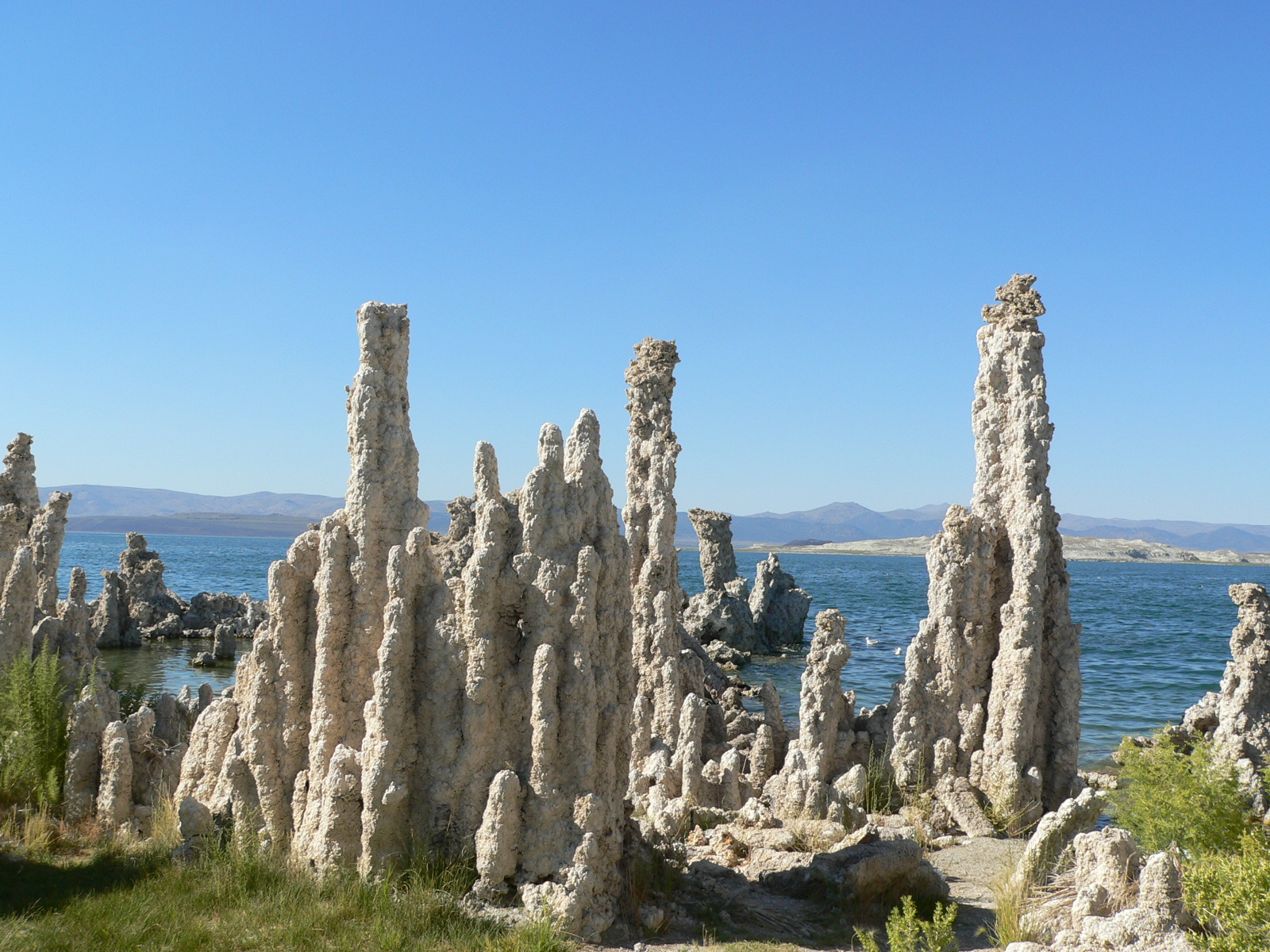
Close-up of tufa columns

Mono Lake Tufa State Natural Reserve is located near Yosemite National Park within Mono County, in eastern California. It was established in 1981 by the California State Legislature to preserve the natural limestone "tufa tower" formations at Mono Lake.

== Access ==
California State Park Rangers were charged with conducting interpretive talks and tours along the shores of Mono Lake, as well as protecting the resources. In 1984 the Federal Government designated surrounding lands as the Mono Basin National Scenic Area. Since that time visitor services have been offered as a cooperative effort between these two agencies, as well as the Mono Lake Committee.

== See also ==
- Mono-Inyo Craters
- Bishop Tuff
