= Bodie Mountains =

Mountain range in Nevada and California, US

- Location within Nevada

Highest point
- Elevation: 2,269 m (7,444 ft)

Geography
- Country: United States
- State: Nevada
- District: Mineral County
- Range coordinates: 38°17′21.715″N 118°52′12.505″W
- Topo map: USGS Mount Hicks

The Bodie Mountains are a mountain range primarily in western Mineral County, Nevada.

They extend westward into Mono County, California, where they become the Bodie Hills with the mining district and town of Bodie, California.

The Sierra Nevada tower high to the west.

== Bodie State Historic Park ==
The mining town of Bodie, California is now a preserved ghost town in Bodie State Historic Park, designated a National Historic Landmark.

Roads to Bodie and beyond it allow ease of exploring the Bodie Mountains and Hills.
