= Mono–Inyo Craters =

Volcanic chain in eastern California, United States

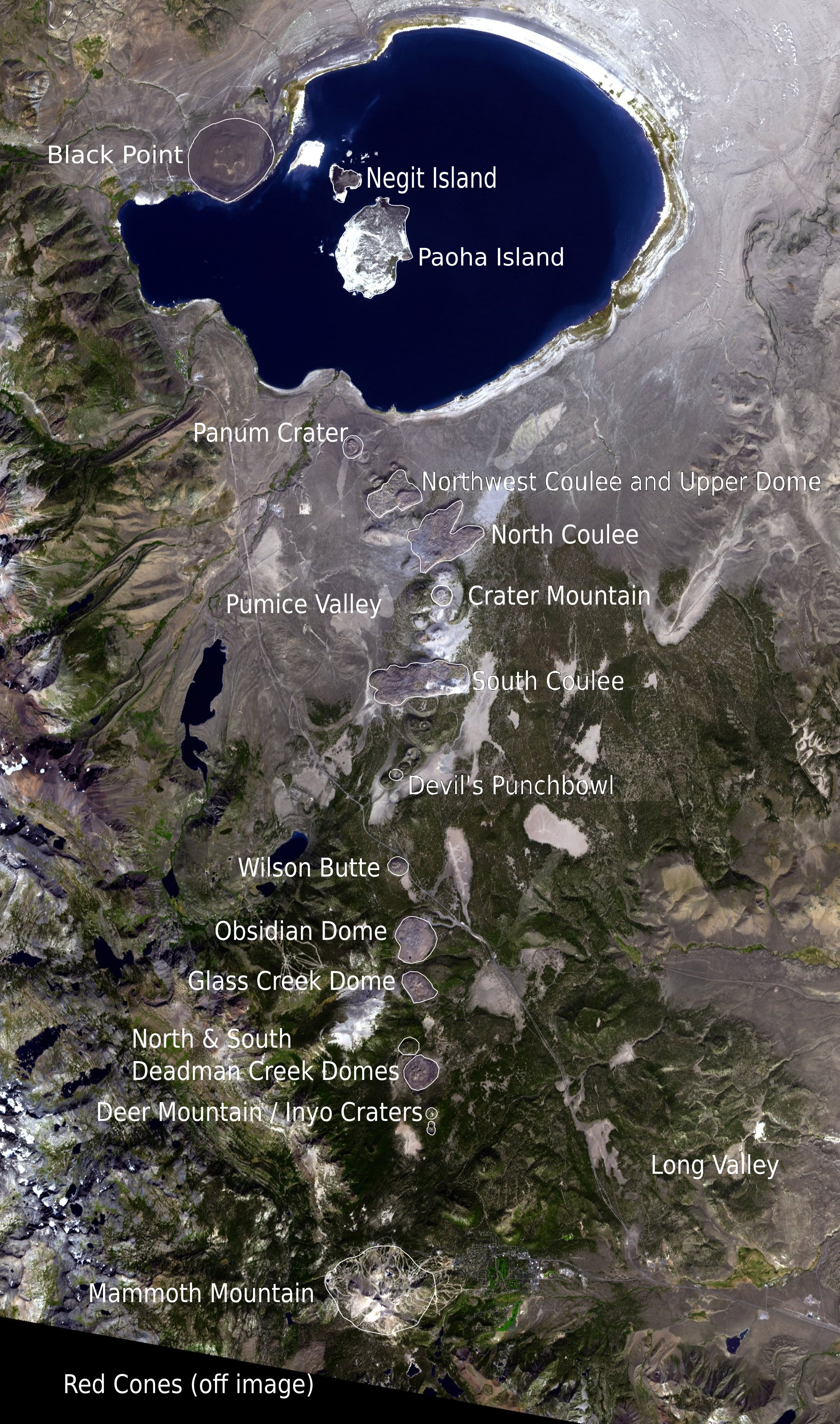
- Annotated satellite image of the chain

Highest point
- Peak: Crater Mountain (Note: Geographically, Mammoth Mountain (11,059 feet or 3,371 meters) is considered part of the Sierra Nevada mountain range, not the Mono–Inyo Craters mountain range, but volcanically, Mammoth Mountain and the southern part of the Mono–Inyo Craters share the same precursor activity. Explosion pits and fumaroles on the mountain formed in the last 1,000 years are considered part of the volcanic activity directly related to the Mono–Inyo Craters.)
- Elevation: 9,172 ft (2,796 m)
- Coordinates: 37°52′40″N 119°0′25″W

Dimensions
- Length: 25 mi (40 km)

Geography
- Country: United States
- State: California
- Region: Eastern California
- County: Mono
- Town: Mammoth Lakes, California
- Range coordinates: 37°53′N 119°0′W

Geology
- Rock age: About 40,000 years
- Rock type(s): Lava domes,cinder cones

The Mono–Inyo Craters are a volcanic chain of craters, domes and lava flows in Mono County, Eastern California, United States. The chain stretches 25 miles (40 km) from the northwest shore of Mono Lake to the south of Mammoth Mountain. The Mono Lake Volcanic Field forms the northernmost part of the chain and consists of two volcanic islands in the lake and one cinder cone volcano on its northwest shore. Most of the Mono Craters, which make up the bulk of the northern part of the Mono–Inyo chain, are phreatic (steam explosion) volcanoes that have since been either plugged or over-topped by rhyolite domes and lava flows. The Inyo volcanic chain form much of the southern part of the chain and consist of phreatic explosion pits, and rhyolitic lava flows and domes. The southernmost part of the chain consists of fumaroles and explosion pits on Mammoth Mountain and a set of cinder cones south of the mountain; the latter are called the Red Cones.

Eruptions along the narrow fissure system under the chain began in the west moat of Long Valley Caldera 400,000 to 60,000 years ago. Mammoth Mountain was formed during this period. Multiple eruptions from 40,000 to 600 years ago created the Mono Craters and eruptions 5,000 to 500 years ago formed the Inyo volcanic chain. Lava flows 5,000 years ago built the Red Cones, and explosion pits on Mammoth Mountain were excavated in the last 1,000 years. Uplift of Paoha Island in Mono Lake about 250 years ago is the most recent activity. These eruptions most likely originated from small magma bodies rather than from a single, large magma chamber like the one that produced the massive Long Valley Caldera eruption 760,000 years ago. During the past 3,000 years, eruptions have occurred every 250 to 700 years. In 1980, a series of earthquakes and uplift within and south of Long Valley Caldera indicated renewed activity in the area.

The region has been used by humans for centuries. Obsidian was collected by Mono Paiutes for making sharp tools and arrow points. Glassy rock continues to be removed in modern times for use as commercial scour and yard decoration. Mono Mills processed timber felled on or near the volcanoes for the nearby boomtown Bodie in the late 19th to early 20th centuries. Water diversions into the Los Angeles Aqueduct system from their natural outlets in Mono Lake started in 1941 after a water tunnel was cut under the Mono Craters. Mono Lake Volcanic Field and a large part of the Mono Craters gained some protection under Mono Basin National Forest Scenic Area in 1984. Resource use along all of the chain is managed by the United States Forest Service as part of Inyo National Forest. Various activities are possible along the chain, including hiking, bird watching, canoeing, skiing, and mountain biking.

== Geography and description ==
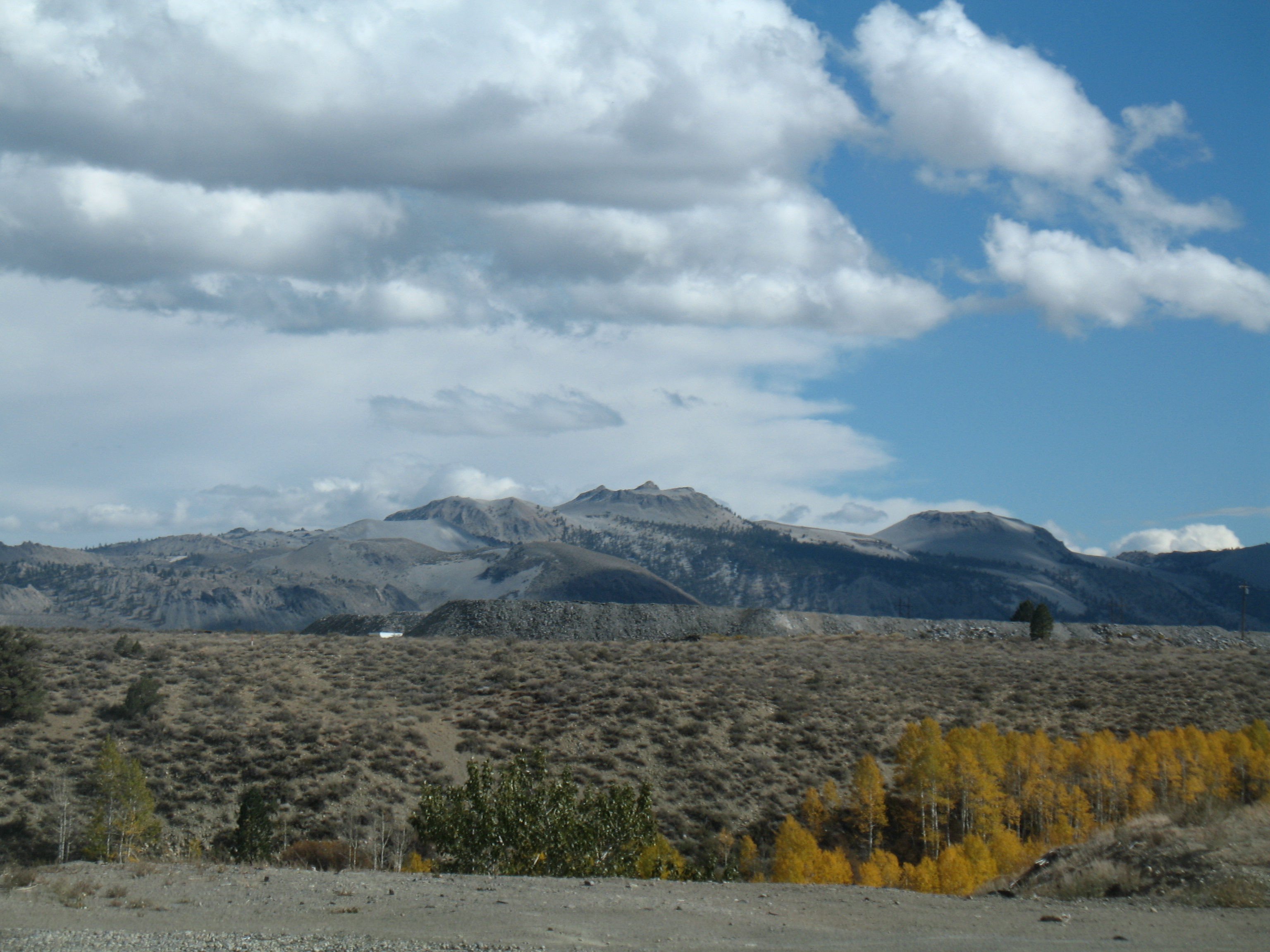
Mono Craters

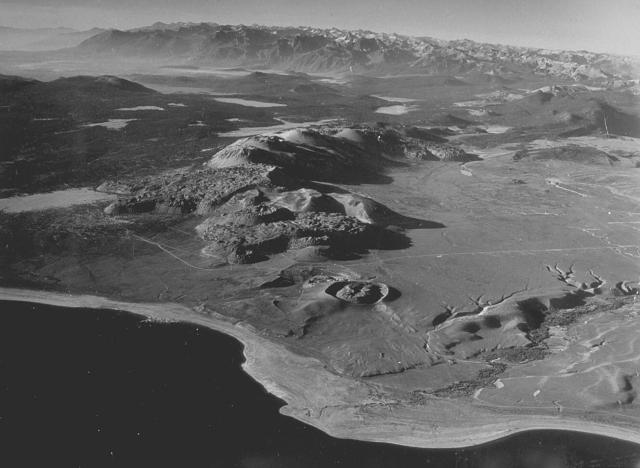
The Mono Craters form an arc of overlapping lava domes and flows.

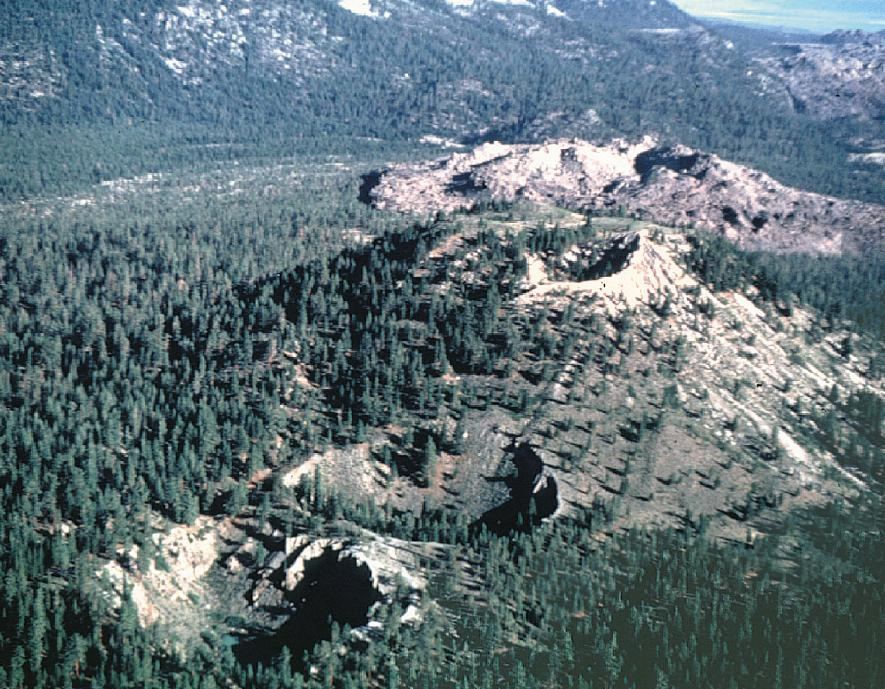
The Inyo Craters are a set of explosion pits.

=== Setting ===
The Mono–Inyo Craters form a volcanic chain in Eastern California that sits along a narrow north–south-trending fissure system extending from the north shore of Mono Lake through the western Long Valley Caldera, south of Mammoth Mountain. The chain is within the Inyo National Forest and Mono County; the nearest incorporated community is Mammoth Lakes. The craters are in the Great Basin geographic area.

==== Mono Craters ====
The Mono Craters are a 10.5-mile (17 km) chain of at least 27 volcanic domes, three large glass flows called coulees and various explosion pits and other associated volcanic features. The domes of the chain lie on a roughly north–south-trending arc that is concave to the west and located south of Mono Lake. The highest of the Mono Craters domes is Crater Mountain (elevation 9,172 feet or 2,796 m), which rises 2,400 feet (730 m) above Pumice Valley to the west. Associated volcanic features are located in Mono Lake (Paoha and Negit Islands) and on its north shore (Black Point). The coulees cluster north and south of the overlapping chain of domes.

==== Inyo volcanic chain ====
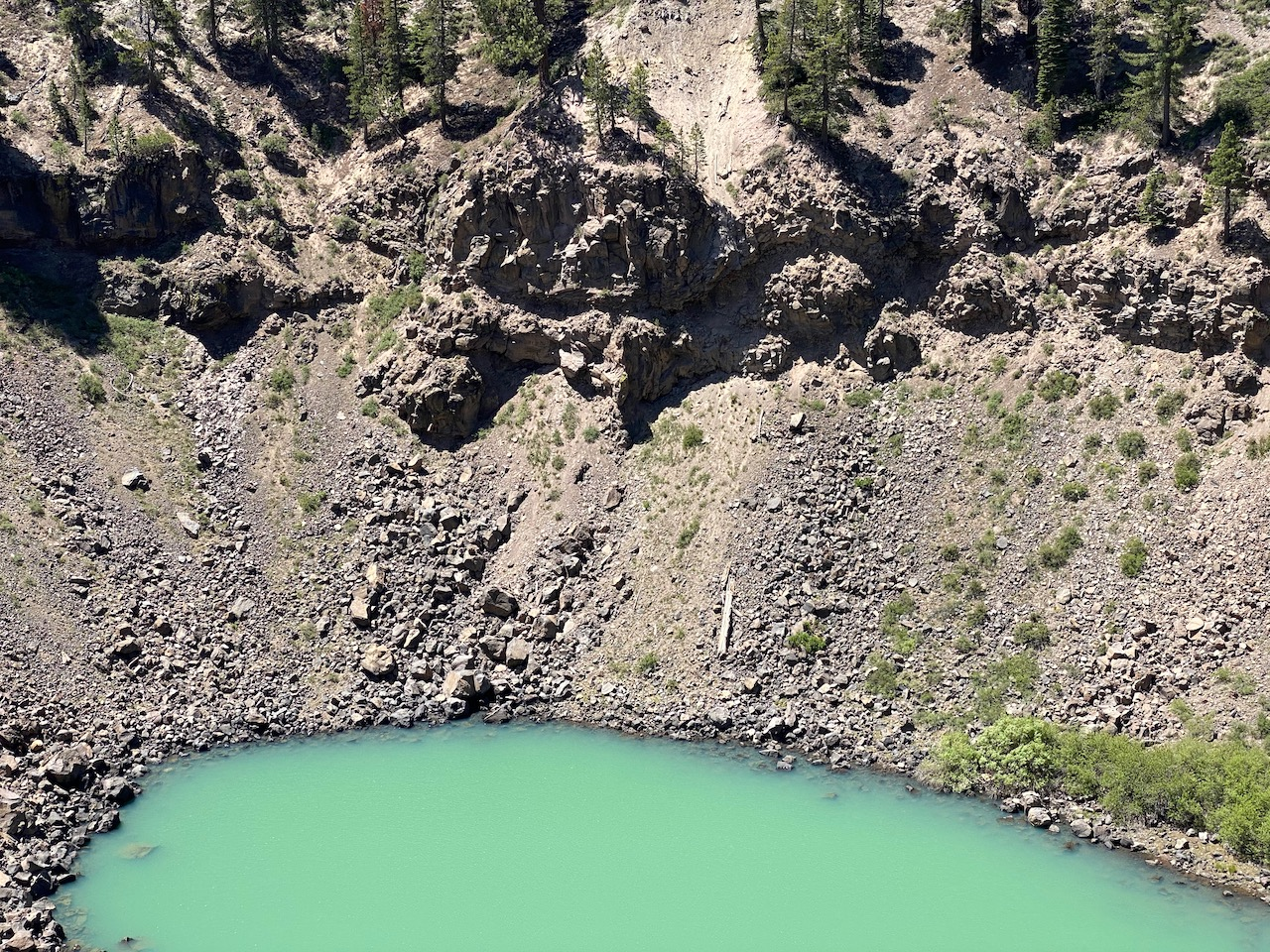
Photo from the edge of southernmost of the Inyo craters

The Inyo volcanic chain stretches 6 miles (10 km) from Wilson Butte to the Inyo Craters, proper. The Inyo Craters are open pits in a forested area that are about 600 feet (180 m) across and 100 to 200 feet (30 to 60 m) deep, each with small ponds covering their floors. A quarter mile (half kilometer) north of these is another explosion pit on top of Deer Mountain. Farther north of these craters are five lava domes, including Deadman Creek Dome, Glass Creek Dome, Obsidian Dome, and Wilson Butte. These domes are composed of gray rhyolite, frothy pumice, and black obsidian. The Inyo volcanic chain extends into Long Valley Caldera but is not related to the caldera's volcanism.

==== Red Cones ====
South of the Inyo volcanic chain are other features related to the dike system responsible for creating the craters, volcanoes and lava flows. These include a north–south trend of fault scarps up to 20 feet (6 m) high and pull-apart cracks or fissures in the earth. These fissures are not technically faults because little or no vertical or horizontal movement has occurred along them. Most notable among these is "Earthquake Fault", a fissure up to 10 feet (3 m) wide that cuts 60 to 70 feet (18 to 21 m) into glassy rhyolite lava flows. The fissure was formed by stretching induced by the intrusion of the Inyo dike. Stairs to the bottom of the fissure were removed after being damaged by earthquakes in 1980. Several Mono–Inyo-related explosion pits are on Mammoth Mountain. The Red Cones, south of Mammoth Mountain, are basaltic cinder cones and are the southernmost part of the Mono–Inyo Craters volcanic chain.

=== Climate and ecology ===
The Mono–Inyo Craters are in the Central Basin and Range ecoregion of the North American Desert. The desert environment of Mono Basin receives about 14 inches (36 cm) of precipitation a year. Annual precipitation around Mammoth Lakes, which is close to the Inyo volcanic chain, is about 23 inches (58 cm). Moisture travels over the Sierra crest from the Pacific Ocean through the San Joaquin Gap. Temperatures in Mono Basin range from average winter lows of 20 to 28 °F (−7 to −2 °C) to average summer highs of 75 to 84 °F (24 to 29 °C). Temperatures near the Inyo volcanic chain and Mammoth Lakes area range from winter average lows of 16 to 21 °F (−9 to −6 °C) to summer average highs of 70 to 78 °F (21 to 26 °C).

Most of the surface of the Mono Craters is barren but its slopes are covered by Jeffrey pine forest and partial greenery. Pumice Valley, directly to the west, is covered by sagebrush scrubland. The soil consists primarily of deep pumice, which does not hold water well. Mycorrhizal fungi in the soil invade the roots of Jeffrey pine trees in a symbiotic relationship that helps the pine absorb water and provides nutrients to the fungi. Jeffrey pine forests also surround the Inyo volcanic chain and Mammoth Mountain. Mule deer, coyotes, black bears, yellow-bellied marmots, raccoons and mountain lions all have ranges that are coincident with forests that cover parts of the Mono–Inyo craters.

=== Typical evolution ===
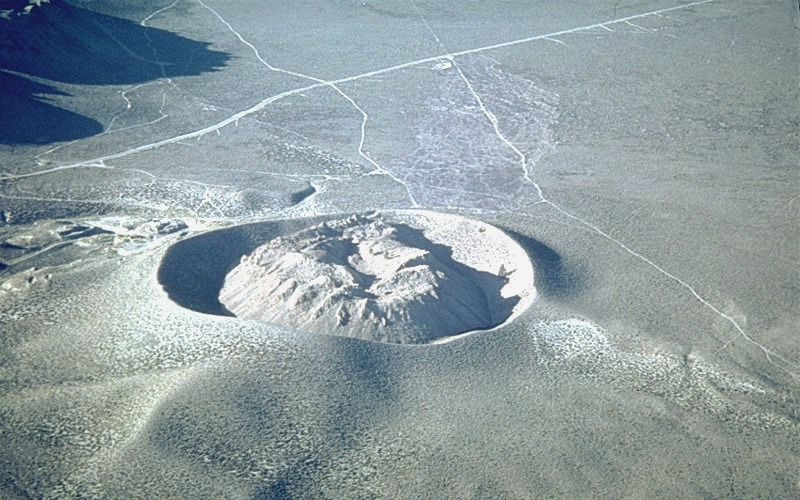
Aerial photo of Panum Crater

Panum Crater is the northernmost volcano in the sequence and is a good example of both a tuff ring and a rhyolite dome. Its structure is twofold; an outer tuff ring (forming a classic crater) and an inner plug, or dome of rhyolite, pumice and obsidian created from lavas. In this case, heat from the magma feeding Panum flashed groundwater to steam to create the tuff ring before lava reached the surface. Other Mono Craters also were formed in this manner, but their plug domes grew larger than their tuff ring craters. The domes have steep sides and are flanked by slopes of scree consisting of large angular and glass-rich rocks. Devil's Punch Bowl, located south of the main dome complex, stopped forming at an earlier stage of development. It is a 1,200-foot (370 m) wide and 140-foot (43 m) deep explosion pit with a much smaller glass dome on its floor.

The large North and South Coulee and the smaller Northwest Coulee consist of obsidian-rich rhyolite. They were formed from slow-moving lava that had a thin and brittle crust. Once the flow stopped, it formed steep sided tongues of sharp and angular rock that are typically 200 to 300 feet (60 to 90 m) thick and have scree piles along their base. South Coulee is 2.25 miles (3.6 km) long, 0.75 miles (1.2 km) wide and has a volume of 0.1 cubic miles (0.4 km^{3}); making it the largest Mono Craters coulee in volume. South Coulee originates from the crest of the Mono Domes, about 3 miles (5 km) from the southern end, flows down its east and west flanks and terminates at its foot. North Coulee is nearly as large, flows mostly to the east and terminates in a divided pair of lobes. Northwest Coulee is located northwest of North Coulee and was intruded by Upper Dome after the coulee solidified. Permanent pockets of ice from snowmelt have been found 75 to 147 feet (23 to 45 m) inside the coulees and domes.

== Geology ==
=== Background ===
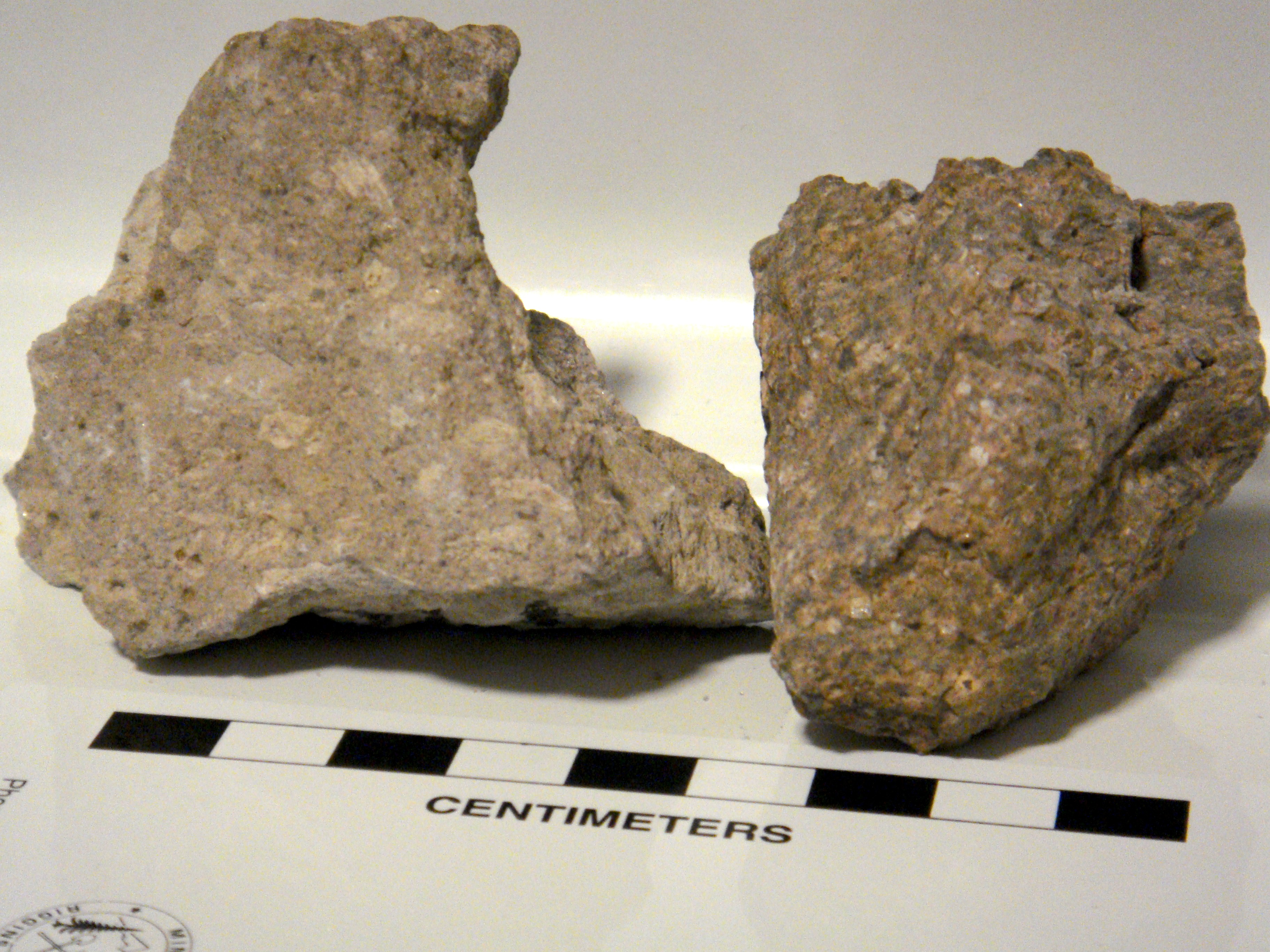
Hand samples of the Bishop Tuff, normal with pumice on left, compressed with fiamme on right.

The Mono–Inyo chain of craters lies in east-central California, roughly parallel to the eastern escarpment of the Sierra Nevada mountain range. Volcanism and seismic activity in eastern California are a result of two major geologic processes: northwest movement of the Pacific Plate with respect to the North American Plate along the San Andreas Fault system near the coast, and east–west extension of the crust that formed the Basin and Range Province. In the Long Valley region, where the craters are located, basin and range extension encroaches onto the thick and stable crust of the Sierra Nevada.

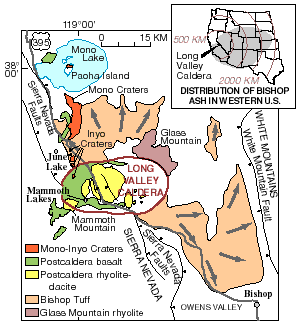
Geologic map of the area.

Basement rock under the Mono–Inyo chain consists of the same granitic and metamorphic rock that make up the Sierra Nevada. Above that layer are basaltic grading to rhyolitic volcanic rocks that are 3.5 million to less than 760,000 years old. Volcanism occurred north of the chain, in the Bodie Hills, as far back as 28 million years. Nearly all the rock east of the Sierra Nevada in the Mono Basin area is volcanic in origin.

Volcanoes erupted from 3.6 to 2.3 million years ago near what is now Long Valley. Rhyolitic eruptions occurred in and around Glass Mountain in the same area from 2.1 to 0.8 million years ago. Volcanic ash from the massive (600 cubic kilometres or 140 cubic miles of ejecta) eruption of Long Valley Caldera some 760,000 years ago is preserved in the thick Bishop Tuff that covers much of the region.

Eruptions of basalt and andesite 400,000 to 60,000 years ago in the west moat of Long Valley Caldera were the first activity associated with the Mono–Inyo Craters system. Eruptions around 300,000 years ago filled the west moat with 800 feet (240 m) of basaltic lava. Basaltic and andesitic eruptive activity then moved to Mono Basin and lasted from 40,000 to 13,000 years ago.

Seismic data indicate that a magma chamber with an estimated volume of 48 to 144 cubic miles (200 to 600 km^{3}) exists 5.0 to 6.2 miles (8 to 10 km) directly below the Mono Craters. About 660 feet (200 m) of subsidence has occurred within a ring fracture system centered on Pumice Valley west of the chamber in the last 700,000 years. The Mono Craters sit atop a 7.5-mile (12 km)-long arc on the eastern side of the 11-mile (18 km)-wide ring-fracture system. Magma feeding the domes may have exploited arc-shaped fissures around an intrusion of granitic rock deep below the chain. This magma chamber is separate from the magma chamber under Long Valley Caldera. The recent eruptions of the Mono Craters have been similar in volume and nearly identical in composition ("crystal-poor high-silica rhyolite") to those of Glass Mountain that preceded the Long Valley Caldera-forming eruption. It has been suggested that the Mono Craters volcanism may represent an early stage in the development of a future caldera.

Repeated eruption of dacite and rhyodacite from vents on the southwest rim of the caldera from 220,000 to 50,000 years ago formed Mammoth Mountain, a volcano composed of overlapping lava domes. Eruptions of dacite and rhyodacite occurred in Mono Basin from 100,000 to 6,000 years ago.

=== Mono Craters, Negit Island and Black Point ===
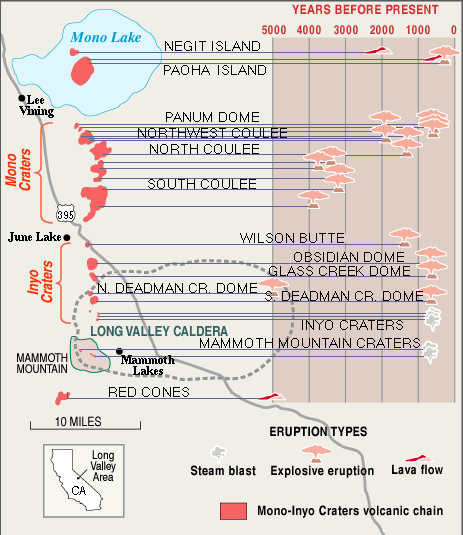
Eruptions in the last 5,000 years along the Mono–Inyo chain

Multiple eruptions of silica-rich rhyolite from 40,000 to 600 years ago built the Mono Craters. Black Point, today on the north shore of Mono Lake, is a flattened volcanic cone of basaltic debris that formed under the surface of a much deeper Mono Lake about 13,300 years ago, during the most-recent glacial period. Several eruptive episodes from 1,600 to 270 years before present in Mono Lake formed Negit Island. The magma reservoir feeding the Mono Lake Volcanic Field is unrelated to the Mono Craters magma reservoir.

Basaltic andesite lava built the Red Cones, two small cinder cones 6.2 miles (10 km) southwest of Mammoth Lakes, around 8,500 before present. The five Mammoth Mountain Craters are a set of explosion pits that trend west-north-west for 1.6 miles (2.5 km) near the northern flank of Mammoth Mountain.

None of the Mono Craters near the lake show the effects of wave erosion, but a hill at the southern end of the field shows what Israel Russell called a "beach line". The present elevation of this beach line is the level of the Mono Lake high stand before the formation of the northern Mono Craters, plus any surface deformation that has happened since that time. Stream-rounded stones are found on the volcanoes, and were lifted up as the volcanoes grew. Although glaciers were present throughout the Sierra Nevada, they did not reach as far down as the Mono Craters.

The most recent eruptive episode on the Mono Craters occurred sometime between the years 1325 and 1365. A vertical sheet-like mass of magma, called a dike, caused groundwater to explosively flash to steam, creating a line of vents 4 miles (6 km) long. A mix of ash and pulverized rock, called tephra, covered about 3,000 square miles (8,000 km^{2}) of the Mono Lake region. The tephra were carried by the wind and deposited in a layer 8 inches (20 cm) deep 20 miles (32 km) from the vents and 2 inches (5 cm) deep 50 miles (80 km) away.

Pyroclastic flows of hot clouds of gas, ash and pulverized lava erupted from these vents in narrow tongues that extended up to 5 miles (8 km) away and covered 38 square miles (100 km^{2}). Rhyolite lava oozed out of the vents to form several steep-sided domes, including Panum Dome and the much larger North Coulee flow. The youngest domes and coulees are 600 to 700 years old and are, therefore, the youngest mountains in North America.

=== Inyo volcanic chain and Paoha Island ===
The Inyo volcanic chain formed approximately 600 years ago. This activity occurred just a few years after the Mono Crater eruptions, and was caused by a dike of similar composition. The dike eventually became 6.8 miles (11 km) long and up to 33 feet (10 m) wide. The ground above the dike was significantly cracked and faulted.

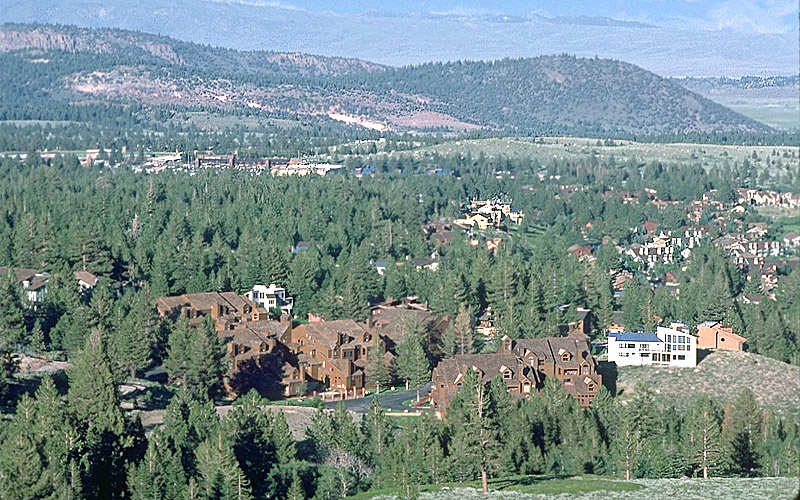
The town of Mammoth Lakes sits on top of ash beds from the Mono–Inyo eruptions.

Explosive eruptions emanated from three separate vents in the summer of 1350 CE. Pieces of molten and solid rock were ejected, small craters were formed, and an eruption column rose above the vents. Pumice and ash covered an extensive area downwind, and about 1 inch (2.5 cm) of tephra was deposited where the town of Mammoth Lakes, California, now sits. A pyroclastic flow from South Deadman vent traveled about 3.7 miles (6 km).

Some of the open pits were filled with thick and slow-moving lava to form the South Deadman Creek, Glass Creek and Obsidian Flow domes. Others, such as the Inyo Crater Lakes near Deer Mountain, remained open and were later partially filled with water. Smaller explosion pits on the north side of Mammoth Mountain were also formed at this time. In the past 6,000 years, approximately 0.19 cubic miles (0.8 km^{3}) of magma has been erupted from the Inyo part of the chain.

The last recorded volcanic activity in the chain was at Mono Lake between the years 1720 and 1850. An intrusion of magma below the lake pushed lakebed sediments upward to form Paoha Island. Exposed rhyolite is on the north part of the island, and a group of seven dacite cinder cones and a lava flow are on the northeastern corner. Steam rose in columns hundreds of feet high (tens of meters) from Hot Spring Cove on the island and the spring water was 150 °F (66 °C) when geologist Israel Russell visited the island in the early 1880s.

== History ==
=== Human use ===
People have used resources on and around the Mono–Inyo Craters for centuries. Mono Paiutes gathered obsidian from the Mono–Inyo Craters to make sharp tools and arrow points. Unworked obsidian was carried by the Mono Paiutes over passes in the Sierra Nevada to trade with other Native American groups. Chips of Mono–Inyo obsidian can still be found at many ancient mountain campsites.

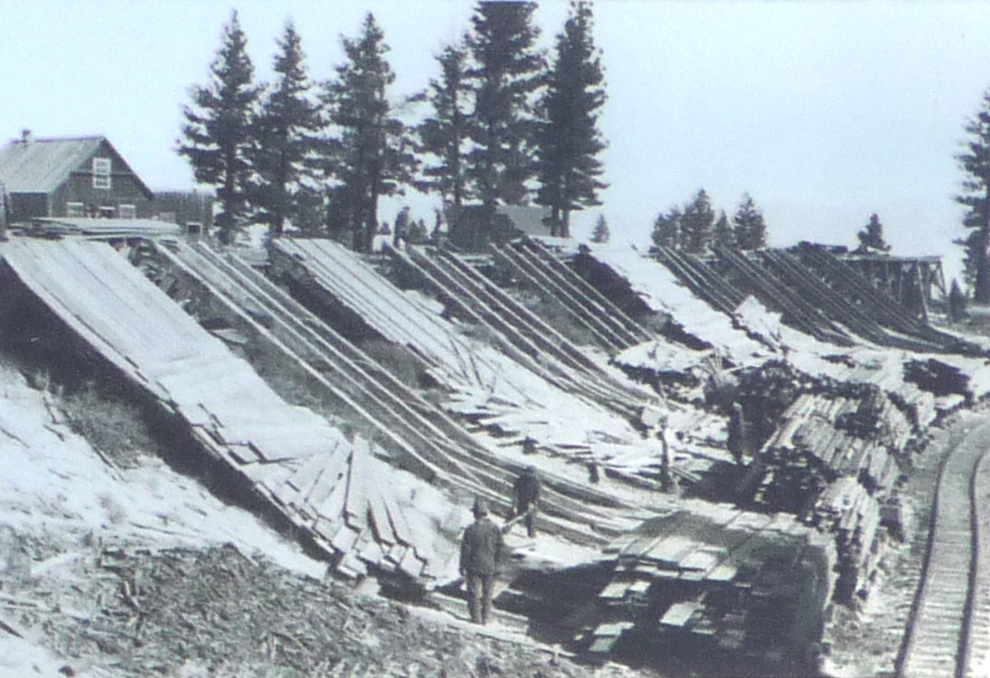
Mono Mills processed wood near Mono Domes for use in the boomtown of Bodie.

Gold rush–related boomtowns sprang up near Mono Basin in the 19th century to exploit bonanzas. The largest of these, Bodie (north of Mono Lake), was founded in the late 1870s and grew large enough to need a tree mill, which was located at Mono Mills, immediately northeast of Mono Domes. Timberland to the east of the Mono Craters was clearcut for wood.

As part of the California Water Wars, the Los Angeles Department of Water and Power purchased large tracts of land in the 1930s within Mono Basin and Owens Valley in order to control water rights. Excavation of an 11.5-mile (18.5 km) water tunnel under the southern part of the Mono Craters dome complex started in 1934 and was completed in 1941. Tunnel workers had to deal with loose and often water-charged gravels, pockets of carbon dioxide gas and flooding. About one man was lost for each mile excavated. Water diverted from its natural outlet in Mono Lake passes through the tunnel on its way to the Los Angeles Aqueduct system.

=== Early impressions ===
The chain of craters has been the subject of several writers and naturalists. Mark Twain visited Mono Basin in the 1860s and wrote about Mono Lake, but did not mention any of the Mono–Inyo Craters except for the lake's two volcanic islands. He wrote in Roughing It (1872) that the lake was in a "lifeless, hideous desert ..." that was the "loneliest spot on earth ... little graced with the picturesque."

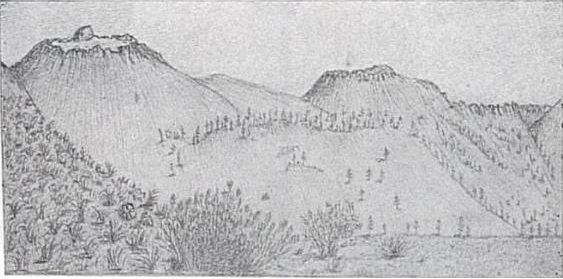
Drawing of the Mono Craters by John Muir

Naturalist John Muir explored the area in 1869. He described the "Mono Desert" as a "... country of wonderful contrasts. Hot deserts bounded by snow-laden mountains,—cinders and ashes scattered on glacier-polished pavements,—frost and fire working together in the making of beauty. In the lake are several volcanic islands, which show that the waters were once mingled with fire." Muir described the Mono Craters as "... heaps of loose ashes that have never been blest by either rain or snow ..."

In the spring of 1881 and the fall of 1882, geologist Israel Russell studied the area as a side-trip during his field research of Lake Lahontan, a now dry lake that covered much of nearby Nevada during the last glacial period. His Quaternary History of the Mono Valley (1889), which included a topographic survey by Willard D. Johnson, was the first thorough scientific description of Mono Lake and its volcanic features.

Russell named the Mono Craters and wrote: "The attention of every one who enters Mono Valley is at once attracted by the soft, pleasing colors of these craters as well as by the symmetry and beauty of their forms. They are exceptional features in the scenery of the region, and are rendered all the more striking by their proximity to the angular peaks and rugged outlines of the High Sierra."

=== Protection ===
The Mono Basin National Forest Scenic Area, created in 1984, was the first National Scenic Area in the United States. It offers more protection than other United States Forest Service lands, surrounds Mono Lake and its two volcanic islands, Black Point, Panum Crater and much of the northern half of the Mono Craters. Litigation and outreach by the Mono Lake Committee, the National Audubon Society and other conservation groups has helped to slow water diversions from tributaries feeding Mono Lake.

== Volcanic hazards ==
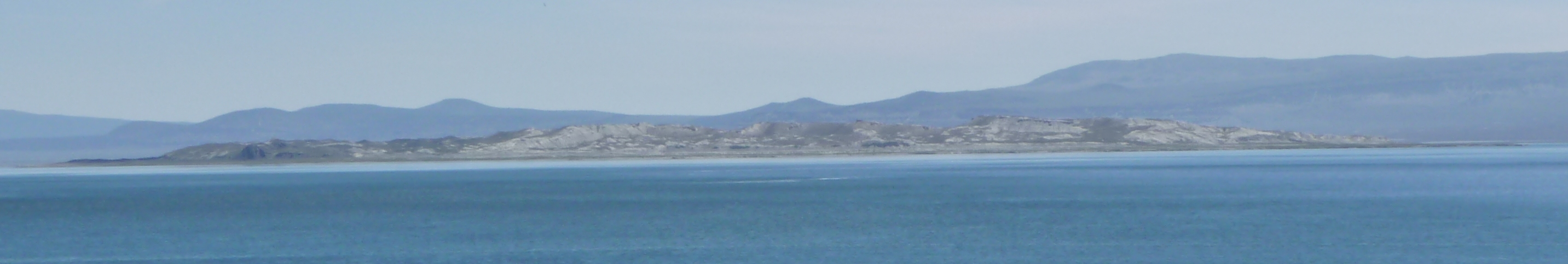
The creation of Paoha Island 250 years ago was the most recent activity along the chain

The Long Valley to Mono Lake region is one of three areas in California that are in the United States Geological Survey's volcanic hazards program. (Note: The other two areas are the Mount Lassen area and Mount Shasta.) These areas are in the program because they have been active in the last 2,000 years and have the ability to produce explosive eruptions.

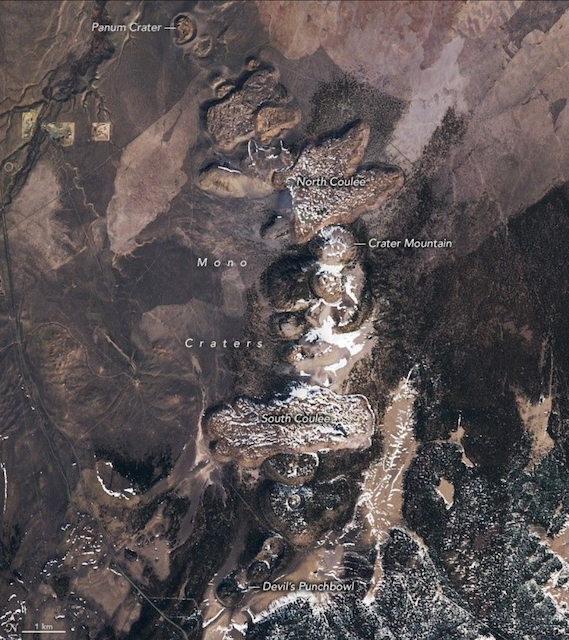
The Mono Craters arc across this image acquired on March 29, 2026, by the OLI (Operational Land Imager) on Landsat 9. NASA Earth Observatory/Lauren Dauphin

About 20 eruptions have occurred on the Mono–Inyo Craters chain at intervals of 250 to 700 years during the past 5,000 years. Seismic soundings and lava composition indicate that these eruptions most likely originated from discrete and small magma bodies. The rate of eruption over the last 1,000 years has increased, with at least 12 eruptions occurring.

All eruptions in the past 5,000 years from the Mono–Inyo Craters have expelled less than 0.24 cubic miles (1 km^{3}) of magma. Future eruptions in the area will likely be similar in size to the small to moderate events of the past 5,000 years. There is a one in 200 chance (0.5%) per year of an eruption occurring along the chain. An eruption in the foreseeable future is probably more likely along the Mono–Inyo chain than an unrelated eruption inside Long Valley Caldera.

=== Effects ===
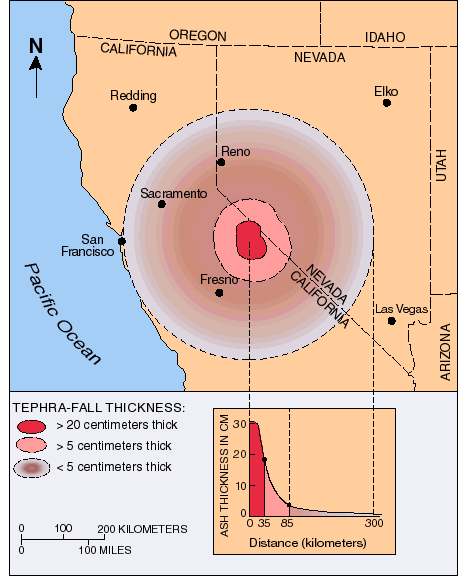
Potential thickness of tephra on the ground from eruptions of less than 0.25 cubic miles (1 km^{3})

A wide range of effects are expected from future eruptions along the Mono–Inyo Craters. Ash and rock fragments (tephra) may accumulate to a thickness of 33 feet (10 m) near an erupting Mono–Inyo vent. Downwind accumulations of tephra may exceed 7.9 inches (20 cm) at a distance of 22 miles (35 km) and 2.0 inches (5 cm) at 53 miles (85 km). Winds in the area tend to blow toward an east or northeast direction more than 50 percent of the time, and toward any east direction more than 80 percent of the time. Grain size and thickness of tephra generally decreases gradually with distance from a vent. Volcanic ash will likely contaminate air routes east of the vent.

Severe damage from super-heated flows of gas, ash and pulverized rock (pyroclastic flows and surges) may occur at least 9.3 miles (15 km) from an explosive eruption. The amount of damage depends on vent location, topography, and volume of magma erupted. Pyroclastic flows from vents on Mammoth Mountain or other high vent could travel farther by gaining extra momentum from their descent. Valleys along the route will be more impacted than ridges but flows and surges could overtop some ridges. Eruptions near snowpacks may produce lahars of mud and ash that devastate valleys and watersheds. Steam blast eruptions under a lake could form large waves capable of flooding nearby areas and starting mudflows.

Basalt lava flows may extend more than 31 miles (50 km) from their vent. Dacite and rhyolite lavas produce short, thick flows that rarely extend more than 3.1 miles (5 km) from their vent. Mound-shaped features called lava domes are often created from these flows. Rock fragments thrown from a growing lava dome may reach 3.1 to 6.2 miles (5 to 10 km) from the dome. A partial collapse of the steep-sided growing dome can send pyroclastic flows outward at least 3.1 miles (5 km). Taller domes tend to form larger pyroclastic flows that travel farther.

== Activities ==
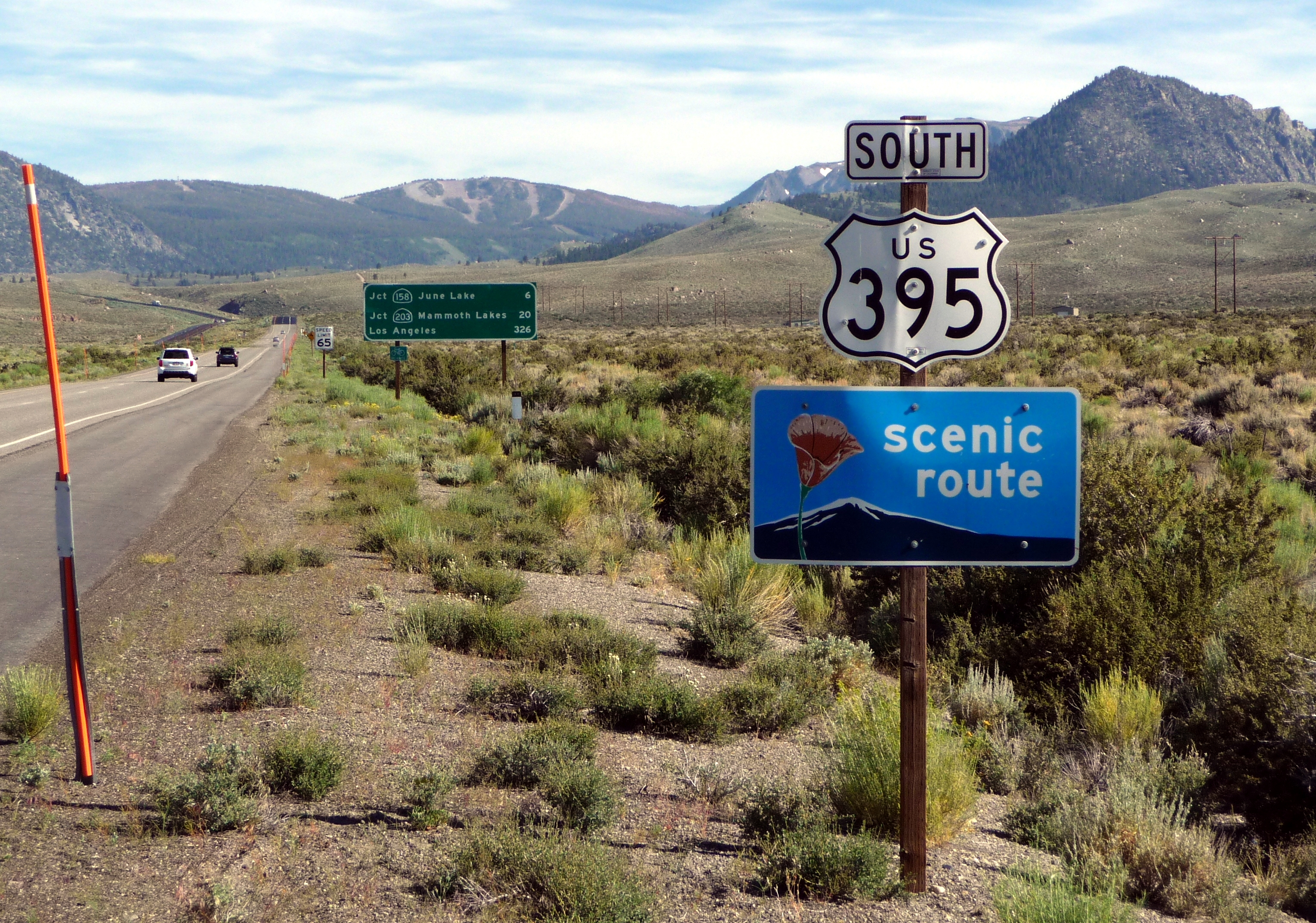
U.S. Route 395 near Mono Domes

Many recreational activities are available along the chain. The Mono Basin National Scenic Area visitor center is located near Mono Lake just off U.S. Route 395. A bookstore, an information desk staffed by USDA Forest Service Rangers, and museum exhibits help to orient visitors. The Mono Lake Committee has a staffed office and visitor information center in Lee Vining on the corner of U.S. Route 395 and 3rd Street. Information on camping, hiking, guided and self-guided tours can all be obtained at either location.

Multiple paved roads surround the Mono-Inyo craters. U.S. 395 is a scenic route that roughly parallels the Mono–Inyo Craters volcanic chain. California State Route 120 approaches the northern and eastern parts of the Mono Domes, including Panum Crater. Mammoth Scenic Loop approaches the Inyo Craters. Direct access to the Mono—Inyo Craters requires driving on unpaved roads, then walking.

The town of Mammoth Lakes and Mammoth Mountain are located near the southern end of the chain. Mammoth Mountain Ski Area is located nearby and gondola rides can be taken year-round (weather permitting) to the mountain's summit. The summit of Mammoth Mountain provides panoramic views of the craters and domes of the Mono–Inyo volcanic chain, Mono Lake, the Sierra Nevada and Long Valley Caldera.

Mono Lake itself has its own set of activities, including walking tours among towers of tufa, boat tours of the lake, and birdwatching opportunities. The lake is too salty to support any fish, but fishing is possible in streams that feed Mono Lake. Additional activities include hiking around and on the craters and domes, and mountain biking outside of the Scenic Area boundaries.

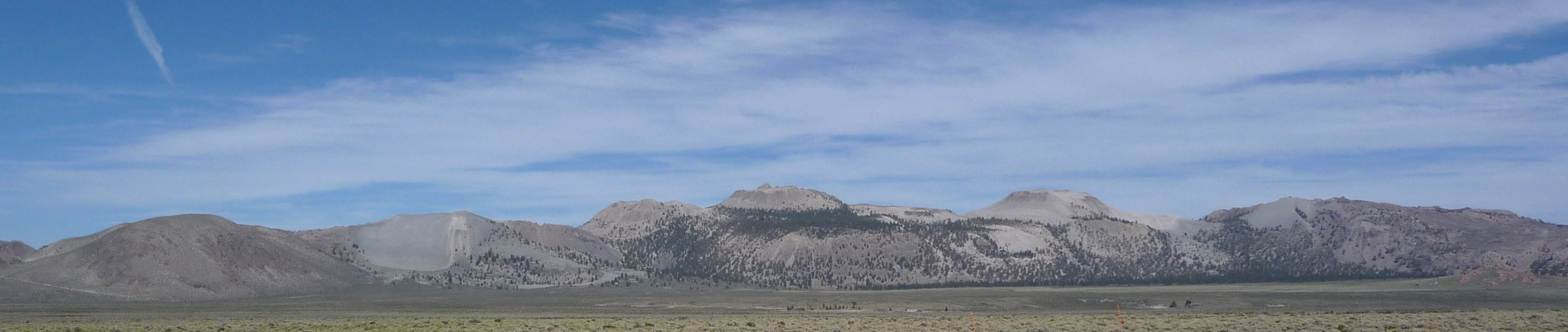
Mono Craters from U.S. 395
