= Mono Basin National Scenic Area =

Protected area in California, United States

Coordinates: 37°57′01″N 119°03′34″W

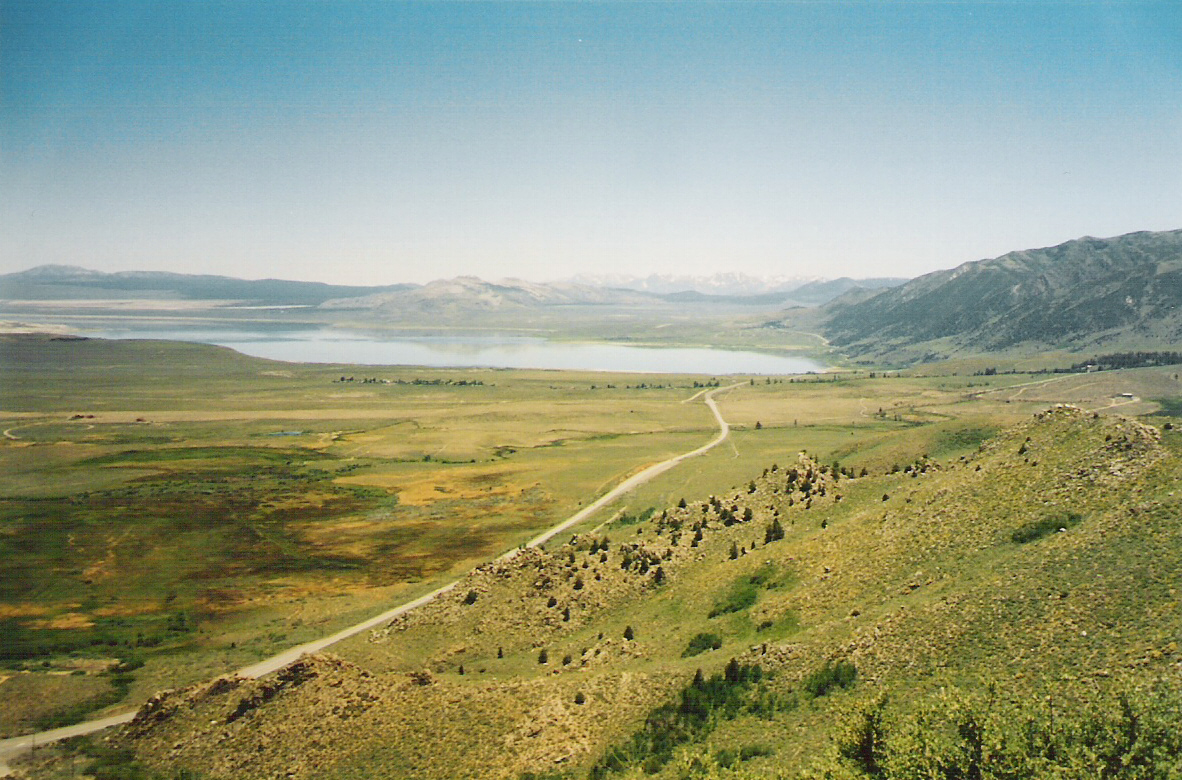
The Mono Lake Basin from near Conway Summit.

The Mono Basin National Forest Scenic Area is a protected area in Eastern California that surrounds Mono Lake and the northern half of the Mono Craters volcanic field. It is administered by the Inyo National Forest as a unit of the National Forest Scenic Area program, under the U.S. Forest Service.

== History ==
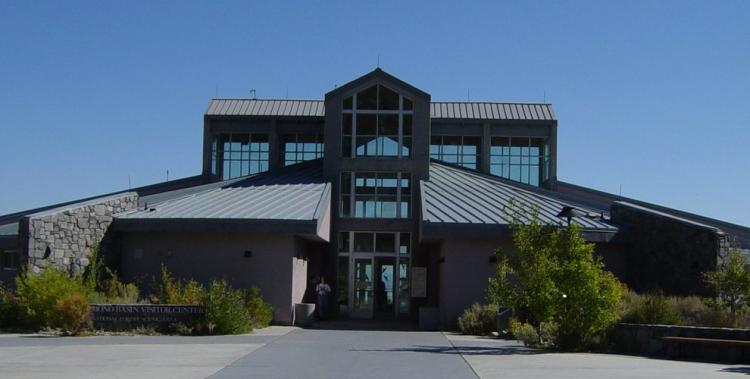
Mono Basin National Forest Scenic Area Visitor Center

The site was first described by tourists in Mark Twain's Roughing It.

Mono Basin became the first National Forest Scenic Area in the United States in 1984.

== Visitor Center ==
The Mono Basin National Forest Scenic Area Visitor Center is located 1/2 mile north of the town of Lee Vining, California, just east of Tioga Pass (the eastern entrance to Yosemite National Park), on U.S. Route 395.

A variety of activities and exhibits introduce the natural and human history of the Mono Basin. A 20-minute film, an interactive exhibit hall, two art galleries, and a book store are available inside.

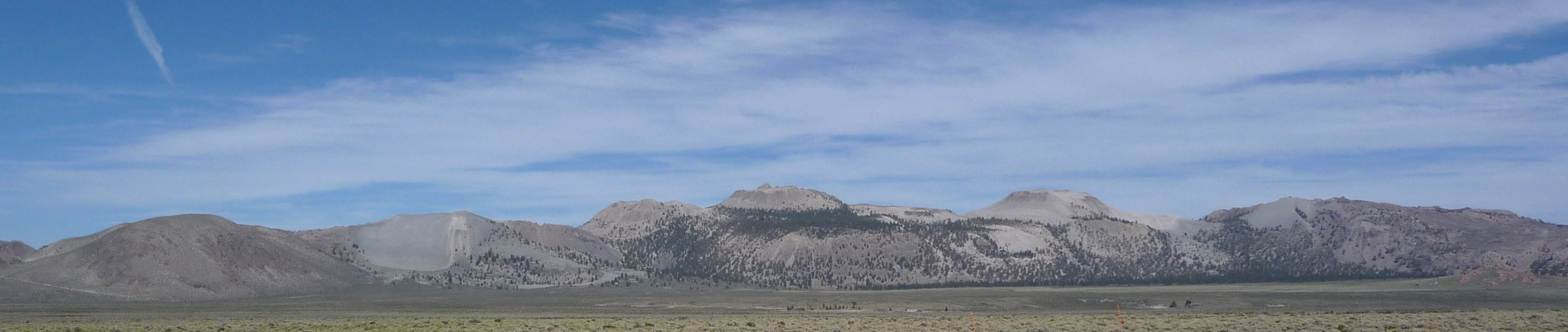
The Mono Craters, viewed east from U.S. Route 395 in California.

== Features ==
- Mono Craters
- Mono Lake Tufa State Reserve
- Panum Crater

== See also ==
- Mono Lake Committee
