= Paoha Island =

Island in the United States of America

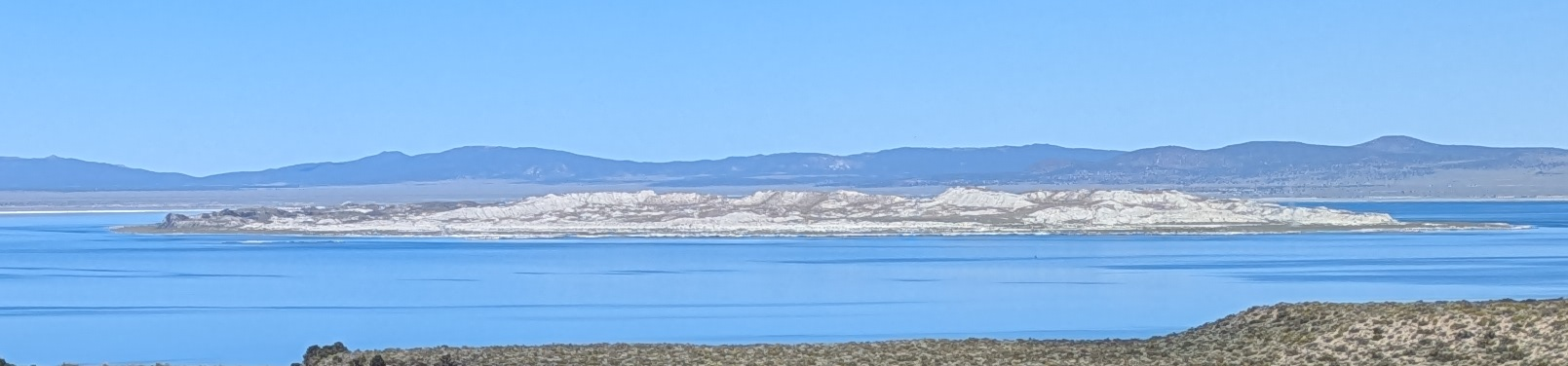
- Paoha Island viewed from Mono Lake Visitor Center

- Location within California

Geography
- Location: Mono County, California, United States
- Coordinates: 37.998°N 119.038°W
- Total islands: 1
- Area: 3.5 sq mi (9.1 km^{2})
- Length: 2 mi (3 km)
- Width: 1.5 mi (2.4 km)
- Highest elevation: 6,670 ft (2033 m)

Administration
- United States

Demographics
- Population: Uninhabited

Paoha Island is a volcanic island in Mono Lake, an endorheic lake in the U.S. state of California. The island was formed by a series of eruptions in the 17th century. It is composed of lakebed sediments deposited above volcanic domes. It is one of two major islands in the lake, the other being the smaller Negit Island. Its name comes from a Native American word, Pa-o-ha, describing the abundant hot springs and fumaroles on its surface.

== History and geology ==
Before the mid-17th century, the present-day Paoha Island did not exist. Volcanic eruptions on the lakebed gave rise to the island, which eventually rose to 6,670 feet (2,030 m) above sea level, 290 feet (88 m) above the present-day elevation of Mono Lake. The pale color of the island is attributed to lakebed sediments rising above the lake surface along with the volcanic material.

The volcanic origin of the island gave rise to many vents, hot springs, fumaroles, and mud pots on the surface of the island. An eruption sometime before the twentieth century created a crater lake that is shaped like a heart. Paoha Island is the younger of the two Mono Lake islands; Negit rose about 1,350 years before Paoha.

Paoha Island was named by Israel Cook Russell, a well-known American geologist, in the late 19th century. It supposedly received its name from the Paiute word pa-o-ha, for spirits they believed to exist in Paoha Island's hot springs. These spirits, or elves, were described as "diminutive sprites having long, waving hair, that were sometimes seen in the vapor-wreaths escaping from the hot springs."

The surface sediments of Paoha Island consist primarily of clay and marl, which are responsible for the pale surface. Volcanic ash is scattered all around the island and basalt is exposed at some of the lower elevations. There are also river-deposited sediments and granite rocks.

In his semi-autobiographical book Roughing It, writer Mark Twain recounted a "voyage of discovery" to the island while camping on the shores of Mono Lake. He and a companion had been led to believe that on the island "within ten feet of the boiling spring is a spring of pure cold water, sweet and pure," but once there they "found nothing but solitude, ashes, and heartbreaking silence"—and they had already emptied their canteens. Meanwhile, their untethered rowboat began to drift away. Marooned, they would have died of thirst and starvation: it was a twelve-mile swim back to shore and "that venomous [lake] water would eat a man's eyes out like fire, and burn him out inside too if he shipped a sea." As the wind of a rising storm blew the rowboat past an island cape, Twain's companion managed to jump aboard and recover it.

== Description ==
Paoha Island is located in the central part of Mono Lake, slightly closer to the western shore. It is a roughly oval-shaped landmass 2 miles (3.2 km) north-south and 1.5 miles (2.4 km) east-west. It is separated from Negit Island to the north-northwest, by a narrow channel. During low water levels, Negit Island and eventually Paoha Island become connected to the mainland in one giant peninsula.

The island is more mountainous near the east side, with the highest volcanic domes rising more or less than 200 feet (61 m) above the lake surface. The highest cone, which contains the heart-shaped crater lake, is located at the far northeastern end of the island. Several small islets are located off the island's west and south shores.

== Works cited ==
- Hill, Mary (2006). Geology of the Sierra Nevada. California Natural History Guides. Vol. 80 (2 ed.). University of California Press.
- Russell, Israel Cook (1897). Volcanoes of North America: A Reading Lesson for Students of Geography and Geology. Macmillan Company.

== See also ==
- List of islands of California
