= Panum Crater =

Volcanic cone of the Mono–Inyo Craters chain in California, United States

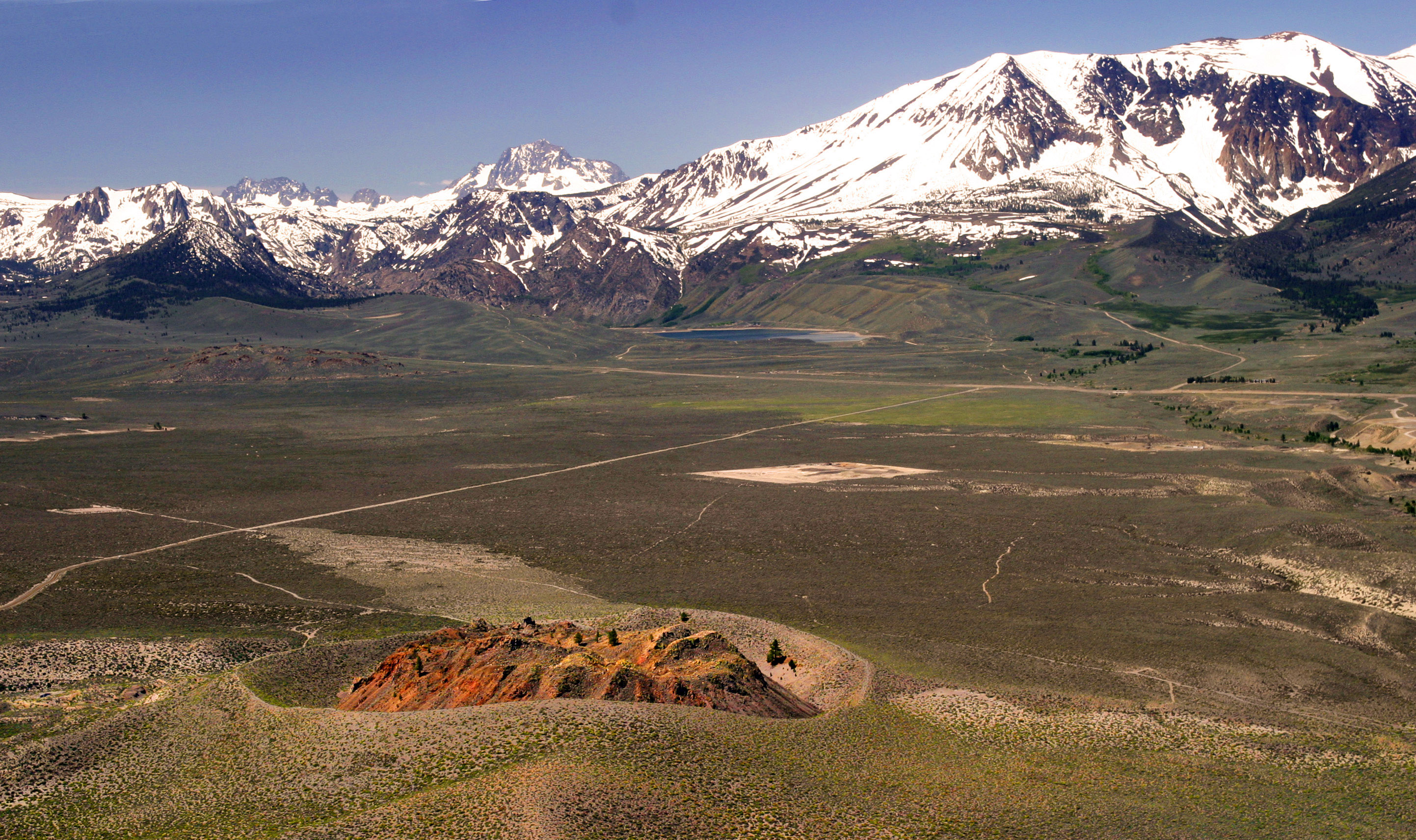
- Panum Crater at the foot of the Sierra Nevada

Highest point
- Elevation: 7045+ ft (2147+ m) NAVD 88
- Prominence: 220 ft (67 m)
- Listing: Great Basin Peaks List
- Coordinates: 37°55′47″N 119°02′41″W

Geography
- Location within California
- Location: Mono County, California
- Parent range: Mono–Inyo Craters
- Topo map: USGS Lee Vining

Geology
- Mountain type: Rhyolite lava dome
- Volcanic field: Long Valley Caldera Field
- Last eruption: 1325-1365 CE

Panum Crater is a volcanic dome that is part of the Mono–Inyo Craters, a chain of volcanic domes and craters south of Mono Lake, east of the Sierra Nevada, (California, United States), and west of the Basin and Range Province. Panum Crater is dated to 1324-1365 A.D. (between 600 and 700 years old), and it exhibits all of the characteristics of the textbook rhyolitic lava dome.

Rhyolitic volcanoes are characterized by having large amounts of silica (quartz) in their lava. The Mono-Inyo Chain, including Panum Crater, is a product of silica-rich rhyolitic magmatism (75-77% SiO_{2}). A high silica content makes the lava very viscous, or thick. Products of this rhyolitic eruption are rhyolites, rhyolitic pumice, and obsidian, the volcanic glass that Native Americans (in this region, specifically the Paiute) used to make arrow points and scrapers.

== Geologic history ==
=== Long Valley Caldera and Mono-Inyo Chain ===
The Mono-Inyo chain sits just outside of the Long Valley Caldera. Most famously, the Long Valley caldera-forming Bishop Tuff eruption preceded the formation of the Mono-Inyo volcanics. Dated to ~767.1 ka, this Plinian eruption lasted 6 days and was triggered by Basin and Range extension. Basin and Range extension resulted in decompression melting i.e. melting caused by thinning of the crust and subsequent decrease in pressure in the underlying mantle. While the Mono-Inyo Craters and the Long Valley Caldera system are in each other's vicinity, the Mono-Inyo volcanics are hypothesized to tap a different magmatic reservoir.

The Mono-Inyo chain, commonly described as sickle-shaped, stretches for a distance of 25 kilometers northwest from Long Valley Caldera. These domes and coulees form some of the youngest volcanics in the Eastern Sierras. Radiocarbon dating of charred wood deposits in the strata indicates that these eruptions are <700 years old, with the youngest in the 14th century.

=== Panum Crater ===
Panum Crater, part of the North Mono Craters, formed in a sequence of events. The first event was caused by magma rising from deep within the Earth's crust. When this extremely hot, liquid rock made contact with water just below the surface, the water expanded into steam and a large, violent eruption occurred. This phreatomagmatic eruption was due to the interaction of the ascending magma with groundwater from the Rush Creek Delta. The material that was thrown into the air by the steam, mainly old lake bottom sediments, was deposited around the new vent in little mounds. So much debris was blown out that a gaping crater was left behind.

Following this was a pyroclastic flow, an avalanche of hot rock and ash that moves at extremely high velocities. For reference, the pyroclastic flow is what wreaked most of the havoc in Herculaneum during Vesuvius’ Plinian eruption.

Once this debris was blown out, a fountain of cinders shot up a great distance into the sky. As this huge amount of ash and pumice began to fall back towards the earth, it formed a tephra ring around the crater. Following the violent eruptions of the first two phases, the remainder of the thick magma slowly rose to the surface in a series of domes. Each dome began with an outpouring of the viscous, rhyolitic lava which hardened and formed a cap over the vent. As magma continued to push up, the cap (or dome) shattered and fell to the outside of the newly formed dome.

As the final dome hardened, a period of spine building began. Thick lava pushed up through cracks of the hardening dome and formed castle-like spines. The formation of the spines was analogous to toothpaste squeezing through the opening of a tube and forming a small tower before it topples over. Most of the spines at Panum fell over and broke because of their rapid cooling and because of many small explosions at their bases. Most of the rocky debris at the top of the dome is the remains of spires that have crumbled. Now the crater boasts 4 domes - North, South, East and Southwest - which each have their own slightly separate compositions.

== Geologic features ==
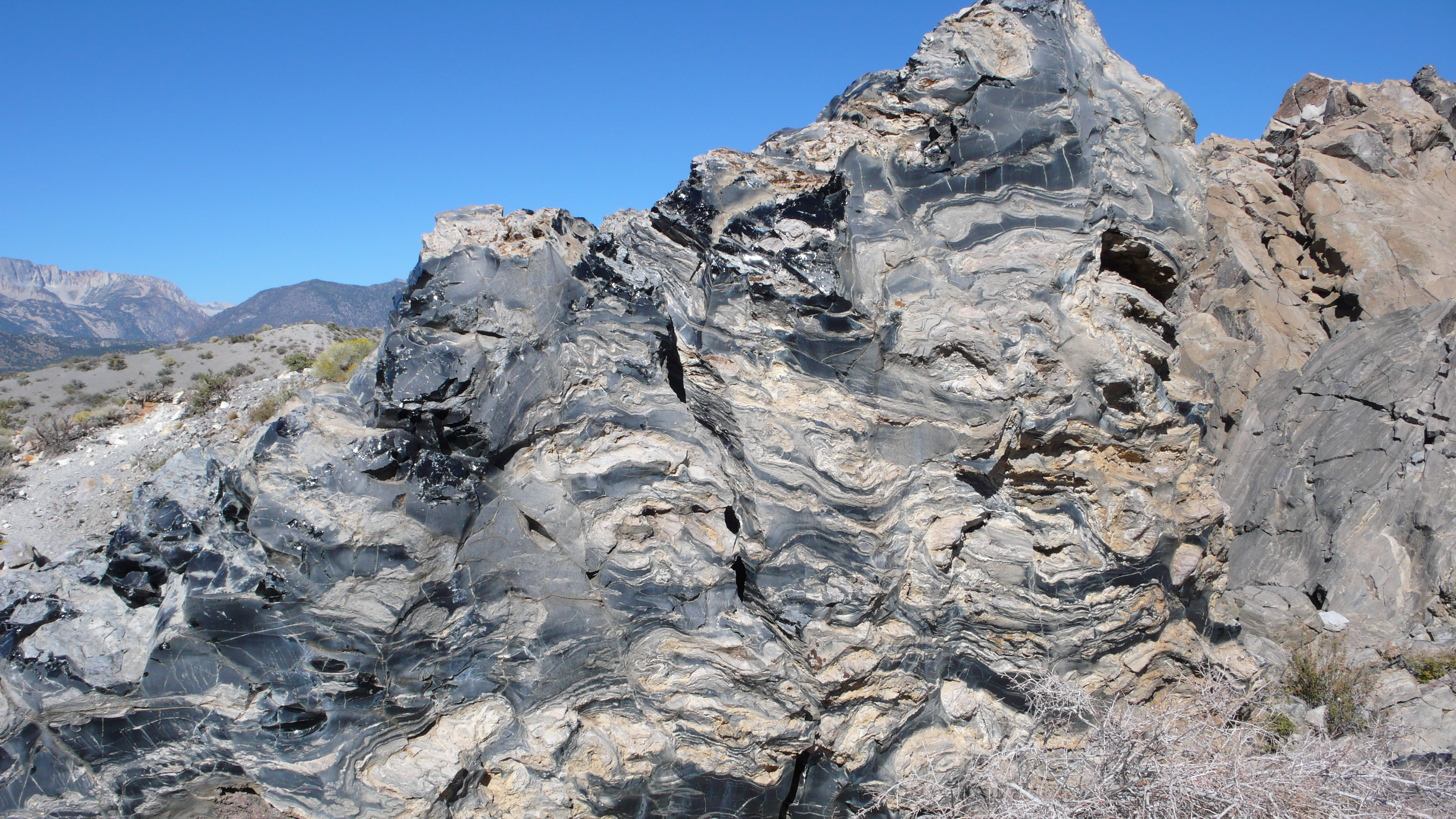
Flow banding in the obsidian (South dome)

The North Dome features multiple vents (regions where magma extruded onto the surface), seen by the oxidation in the rocks around the now debris-covered opening. Near these vents, it is also common to find breadcrust textures on the rhyolitic pumice. Breadcrust textures form when the inside of a cooling rock is still hot, with gas escaping from it while the outside surface has already cooled. As the gas expands from the inside, the outside surface cracks to allow the gas to escape. Another really interesting volcanic deposit found here is Pele’s tears. They are most commonly found at Kilauea, Hawaii, and volcanoes of similarly low-viscosity basaltic compositions. Thus, it is unexpected to find these low-density, tear-shaped rocks at Panum Crater. The South Dome is primarily made of pumice and obsidian of similar rhyolitic composition. There are great examples of pure obsidian flows in the South Dome which display elastic deformation through their squiggly texture.

A few other notable features include tuffisites, boudins in pumice-obsidian flows, and faults indicating the presence of brittle fracturing.
