= Bodie Hills =

Low mountain range in Mono County, California

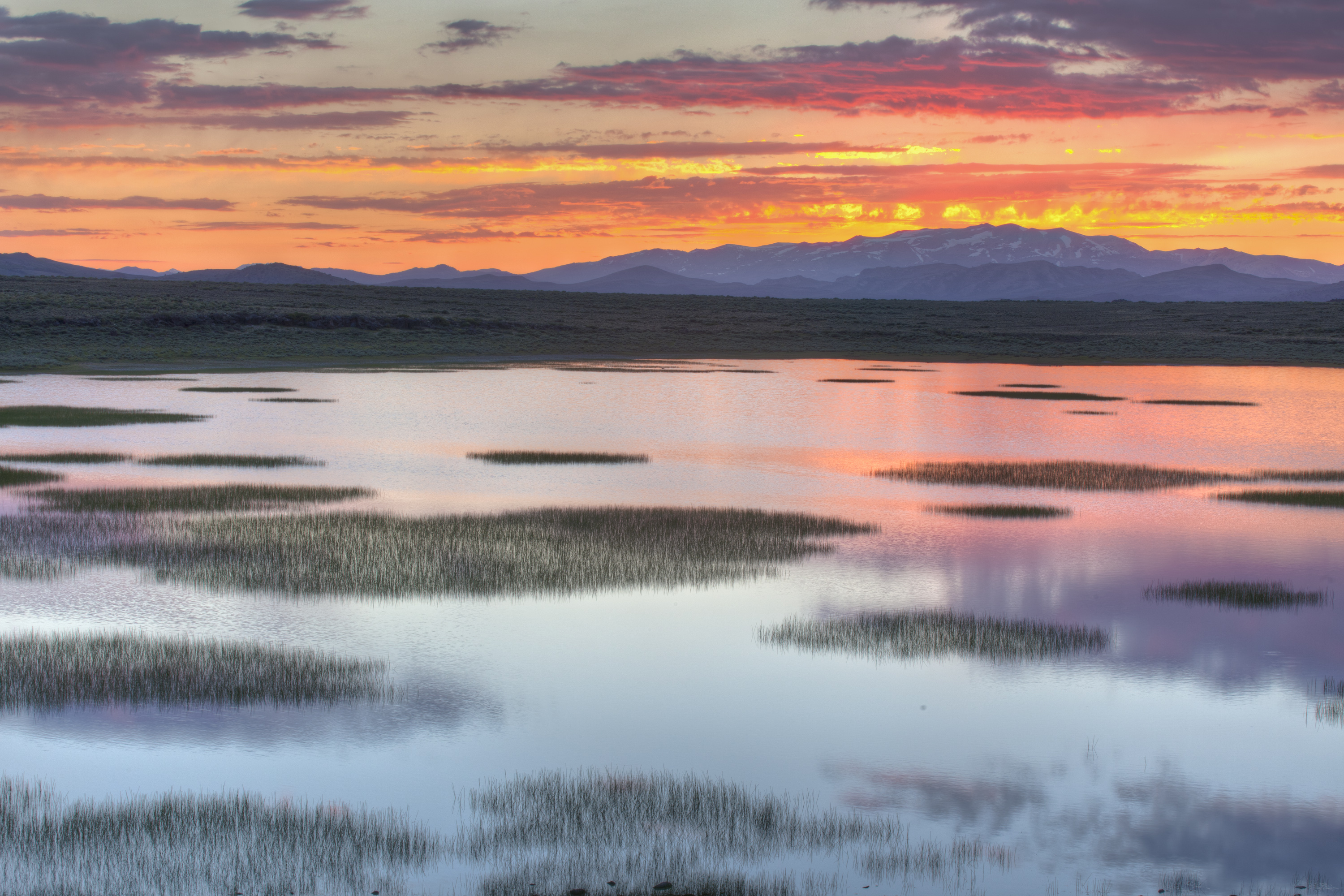

Highest point
- Peak: Potato Peak
- Elevation: 3,115 m (10,220 ft)

Geography
- Location within California
- Country: United States
- State: California
- District: Mono County
- Range coordinates: 38°15′20.704″N 119°5′24.528″W
- Topo map: USGS Dome Hill

The Bodie Hills is a low mountain range in Mono County, California, in the United States. The highest peak is Potato Peak at an altitude of 10,220 ft (3,115 m). The Bodie Hills are between Bridgeport and the Nevada border, where they become the Bodie Mountains in Mineral County, Nevada. The Sierra Nevada lies to the west. The mining district and town of Bodie, California, is located in the Bodie Hills.

Early Native American peoples of the Mono tribe and Northern Paiute people inhabited this locale and engaged in trade with distant coastal tribes such as the Chumash in Southern California.

== Bodie State Historic Park ==
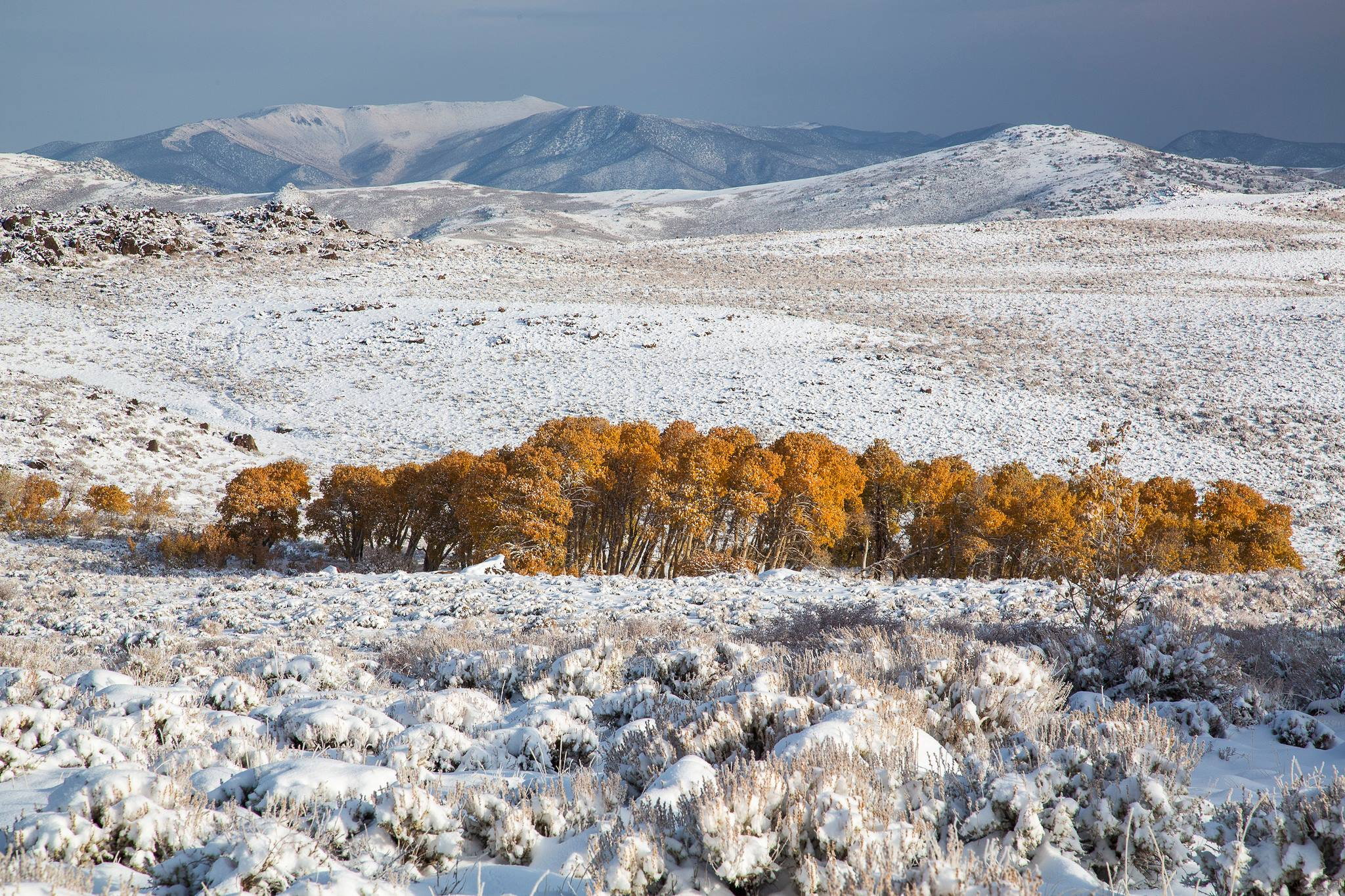
Early winter in the Bodie Hills, 2017

The ghost town of Bodie is now located in Bodie State Historic Park. The preserved California mining district is also designated a National Historic Landmark and a California Historical Landmark. It became a California State Historic Park in 1962 and was opened to the public.

== Climate ==
Climate data for Bodie Mountain (CA) 38.2270 N, 119.0781 W, Elevation: 9,885 ft (3,013 m) (1991–2020 normals)
Month	Jan	Feb	Mar	Apr	May	Jun	Jul	Aug	Sep	Oct	Nov	Dec	Year
Mean daily maximum °F (°C)	35.5 (1.9)	34.9 (1.6)	38.2 (3.4)	42.7 (5.9)	51.0 (10.6)	61.4 (16.3)	69.5 (20.8)	68.7 (20.4)	62.5 (16.9)	52.6 (11.4)	41.7 (5.4)	35.0 (1.7)	49.5 (9.7)
Daily mean °F (°C)	25.7 (−3.5)	24.5 (−4.2)	27.2 (−2.7)	30.8 (−0.7)	38.6 (3.7)	47.9 (8.8)	55.6 (13.1)	54.8 (12.7)	48.9 (9.4)	40.3 (4.6)	31.4 (−0.3)	25.5 (−3.6)	37.6 (3.1)
Mean daily minimum °F (°C)	16.0 (−8.9)	14.1 (−9.9)	16.1 (−8.8)	19.0 (−7.2)	26.1 (−3.3)	34.3 (1.3)	41.7 (5.4)	40.9 (4.9)	35.2 (1.8)	28.0 (−2.2)	21.2 (−6.0)	15.9 (−8.9)	25.7 (−3.5)
Average precipitation inches (mm)	2.93 (74)	2.71 (69)	2.40 (61)	1.40 (36)	1.42 (36)	0.59 (15)	0.60 (15)	0.47 (12)	0.33 (8.4)	0.86 (22)	1.50 (38)	2.49 (63)	17.7 (449.4)
Source: PRISM Climate Group

== See also ==
- List of ghost towns in California
- List of ghost towns in Nevada
