= Alger (name) =

Alger is both a given name and a surname. It originates from the Anglo-Saxon name Ælfgar, meaning "elf spear." Notable people with the name include:

== Given name ==
- Alger of Liège (1055–1131), French Roman Catholic priest
- Alger "Texas" Alexander (1900–1954), American blues singer
- Alger Hiss (1904–1996), American diplomat and alleged Soviet spy
- Alger H. Wood (1891–1970), American football and basketball coach

== Surname ==
- Abby Langdon Alger (1850–1905), American writer, translator
- Alpheus B. Alger (1854–1895), Massachusetts State Senator
- Bruce Alger (1918–2015), American Congressman from Texas
- Cyrus Alger (1781–1865), American metallurgist and arms manufacturer
- Fanny Alger (1816–1889), the first plural wife of Joseph Smith Jr.
- Francis Alger (1807–1863), American mineralogist
- Frederick M. Alger Jr. (1907–1967), American politician and diplomat
- Harry Alger (1924–2010), Canadian politician
- Horatio Alger (1832–1899), American author
- Ian Alger (1926–2009), innovative psychotherapist
- [[Jasper Alger]] (born 2006), Australian rules footballer
- John Goldworth Alger (1836–1907), English journalist and author
- Jonathan R. Alger, President of James Madison University
- Mary Donlon Alger (1893–1977), American lawyer, politician and first woman appointed to a federal judgeship in New York
- Pat Alger (born 1947), American country music songwriter, singer and guitarist
- Paul Alger (1943–2025), German football player
- Percival Alger (born 1964), Filipino Olympic fencer
- Peter Alger (born 1952), New Zealander potter
- Philip Rounseville Alger (1859–1912), American naval officer
- Ross Alger (1920–1992), Canadian politician
- Royce Alger (born 1965), American wrestler and mixed martial artist
- Russell A. Alger (1836–1907), U.S. Senator from and Governor of Michigan and U.S. Secretary of War
- Stephen Alger (born 1958), British tennis player
- William Rounseville Alger (1822–1905), American Unitarian minister, aphorist, and author

== See also ==
- Alger (disambiguation)
