= Carson Peak =

Mountain in California, US

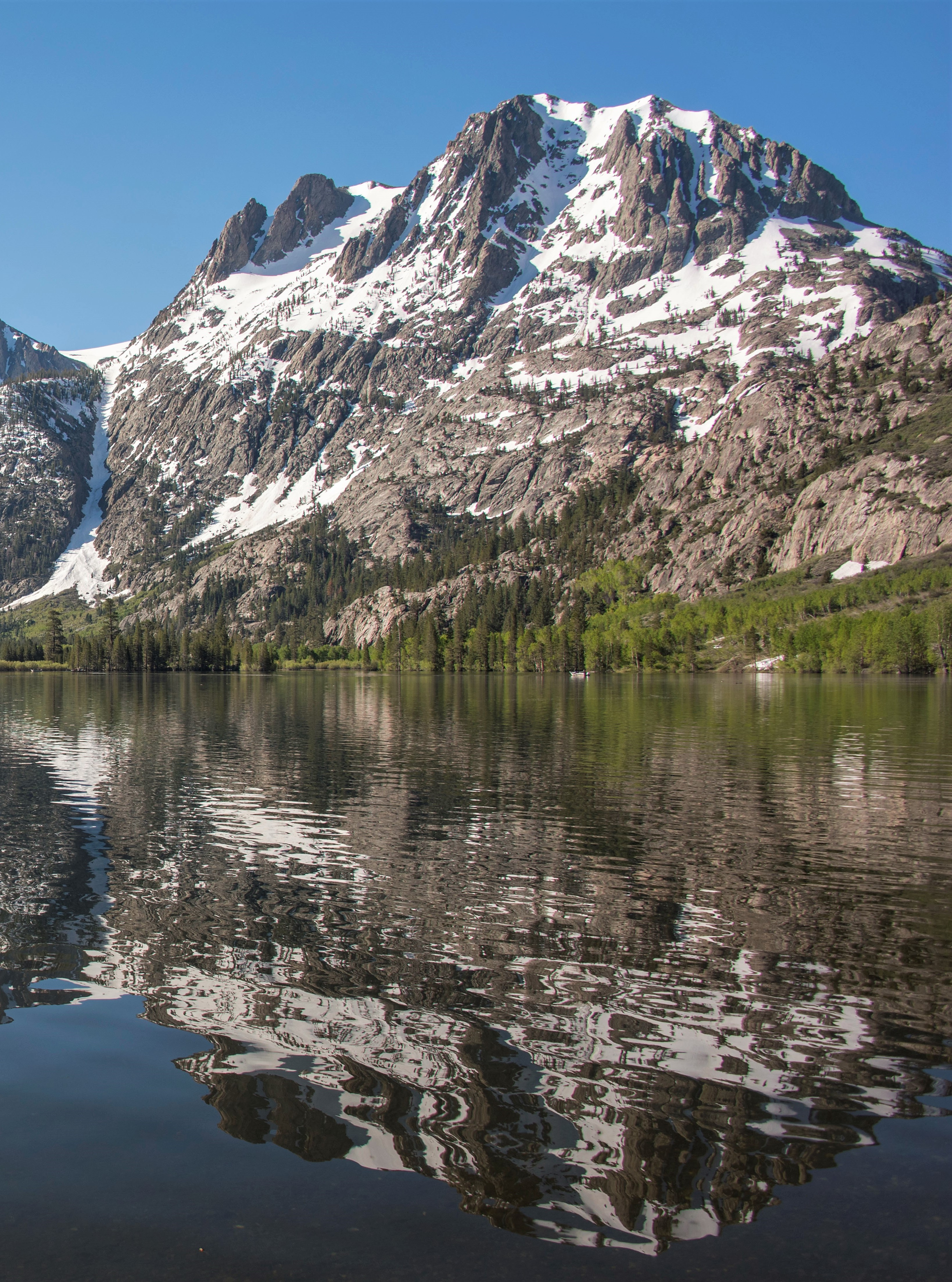
- North aspect reflected in Silver Lake

Highest point
- Elevation: 10,908 ft (3,325 m)
- Prominence: 573 ft (175 m)
- Parent peak: San Joaquin Mountain (11,600 ft)
- Isolation: 2.24 mi (3.60 km)
- Listing: Vagmarken Club Sierra Crest List
- Coordinates: 37°44′51″N 119°07′27″W

Naming
- Etymology: Roy Carson

Geography
- Location within California Location within the United States
- Location: Ansel Adams Wilderness; Mono County, California, U.S.
- Parent range: Sierra Nevada
- Topo map: USGS Mammoth Mountain

Geology
- Rock age: Cretaceous
- Mountain type: Fault block
- Rock type: Metamorphic rock

Climbing
- Easiest route: class 2

Carson Peak is a 10,908-foot-elevation (3,325-meter) mountain summit located in the Sierra Nevada mountain range, in Mono County of northern California, United States. It is situated in the Ansel Adams Wilderness, on land managed by Inyo National Forest. It is approximately 3.5 miles (5.6 km) southwest of the community of June Lake, 2.0 miles (3.2 km) south of Silver Lake, and 2.25 miles (3.62 km) northwest of San Joaquin Mountain, the nearest higher neighbor. The mountain is visible from various locations along the June Lake Loop, and from the nearby June Mountain ski area. The summit offers impressive views of Mount Ritter and Banner Peak. Topographic relief is significant as it rises 3,700 feet (1,100 meters) above the valley in 1.2 mile. The mountain consists of granite of Lee Vining Canyon. Carson Peak is considered an eastern Sierra classic by backcountry skiers drawn to routes called the "Devils Slide" and "Petes Dream".

== Climate ==
According to the Köppen climate classification system, Carson Peak has an alpine climate. Most weather fronts originate in the Pacific Ocean, and travel east toward the Sierra Nevada mountains. As fronts approach, they are forced upward by the peaks, causing them to drop their moisture in the form of rain or snowfall onto the range (orographic lift). Precipitation runoff from this mountain drains into tributaries of Rush Creek.

== History ==
The peak was named after Roy Carson, who died in 1949. While Roy was employed by the Rush Creek Hydroelectric Project in the area, he established the area's first resort in 1916, known as Carson's Camp, at Silver Lake. The fishing resort featured tents until 1920 when the first cabin was completed. This geographical feature's name has been officially adopted by the U.S. Board on Geographic Names.

== Gallery ==
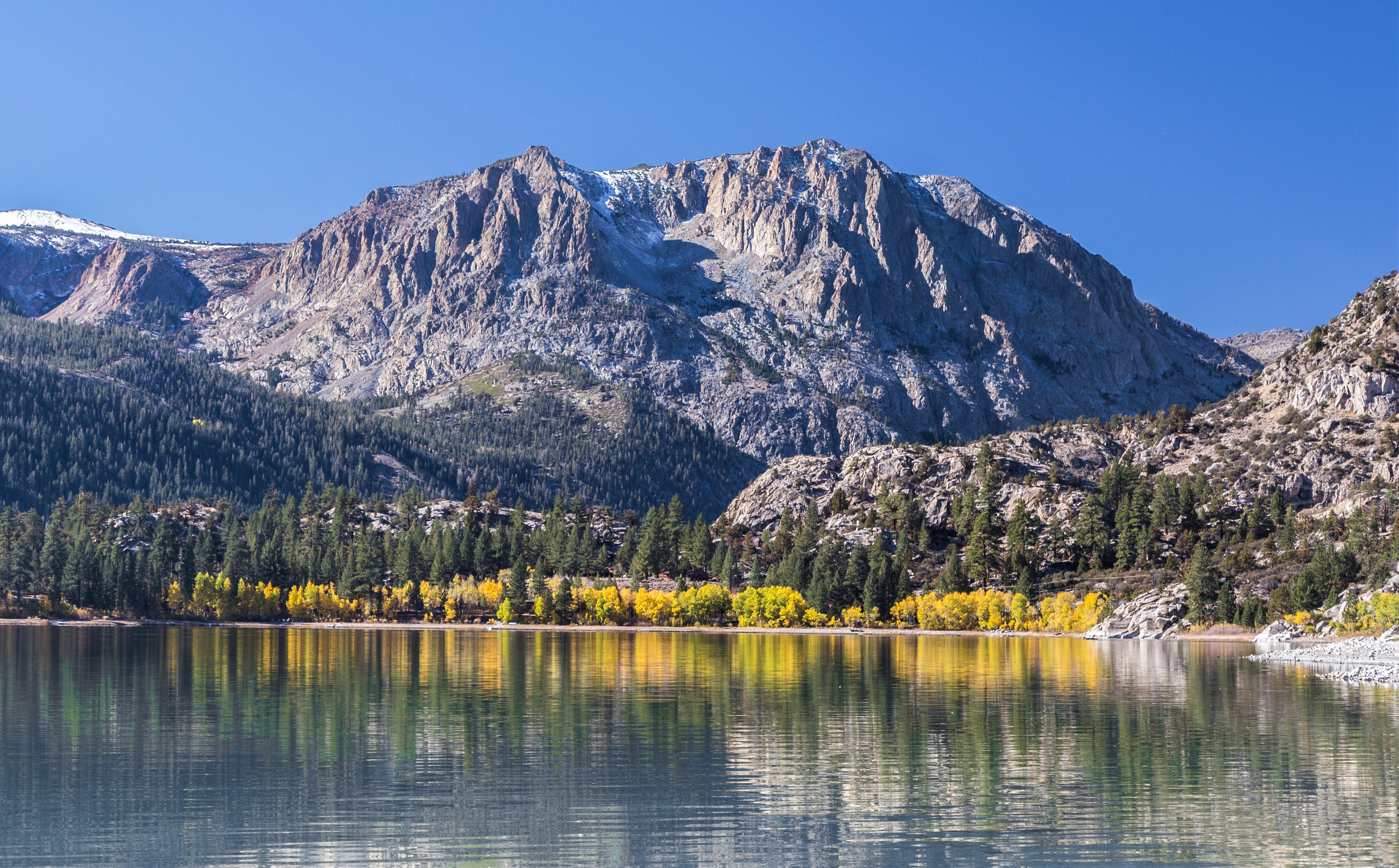
Carson Peak from June Lake

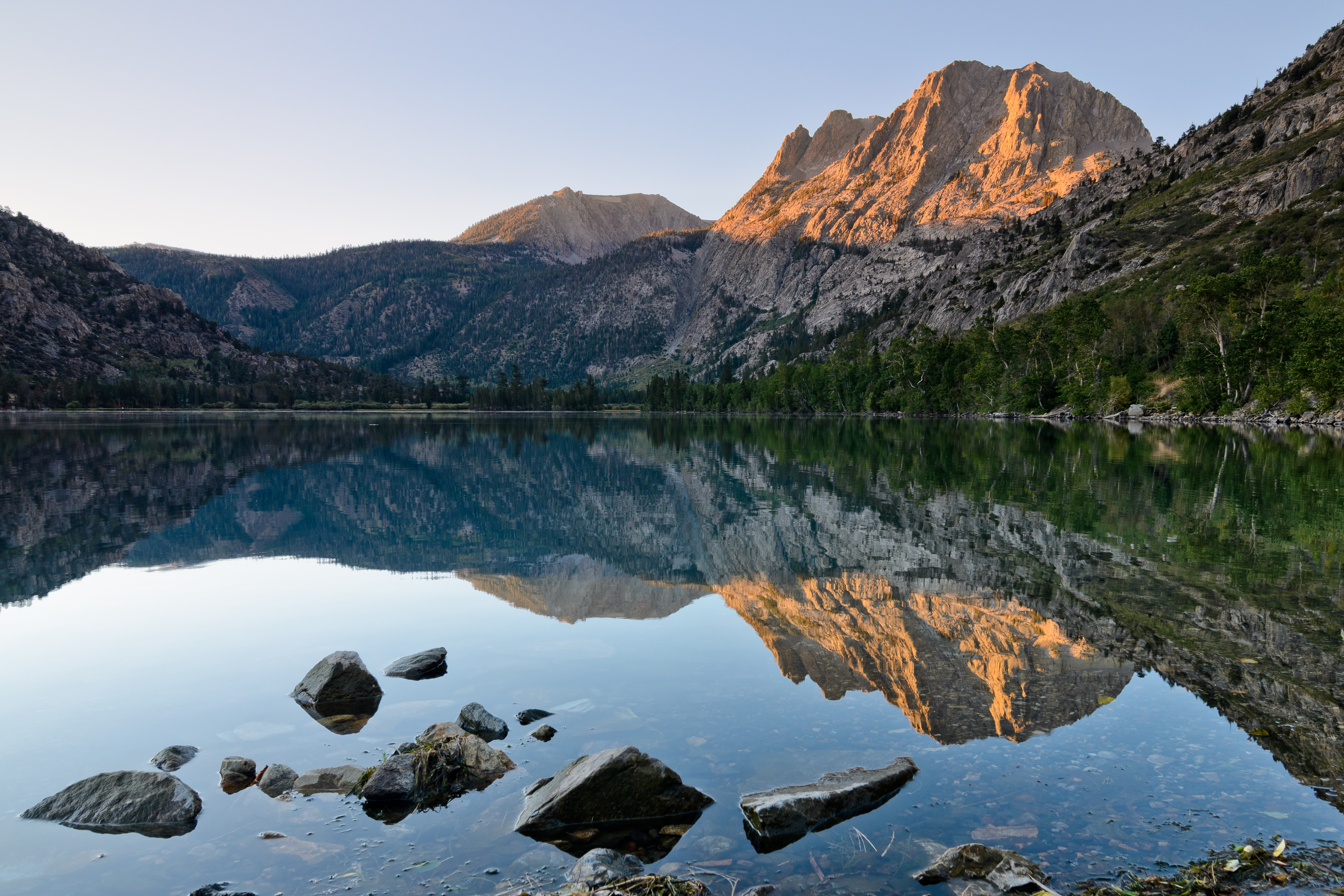
Carson Peak in the summer, reflected in Silver Lake

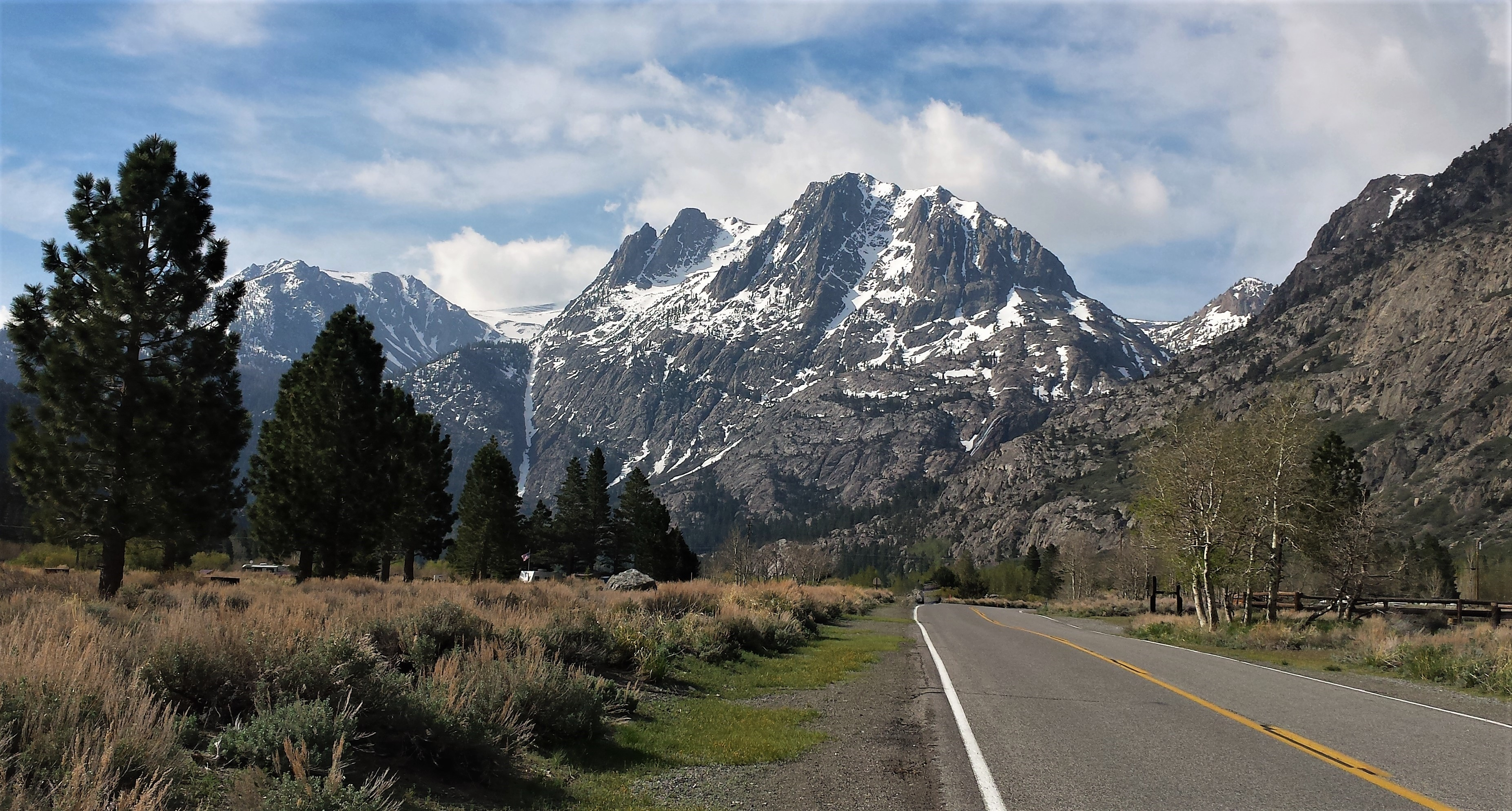
Carson Peak from June Lake Loop

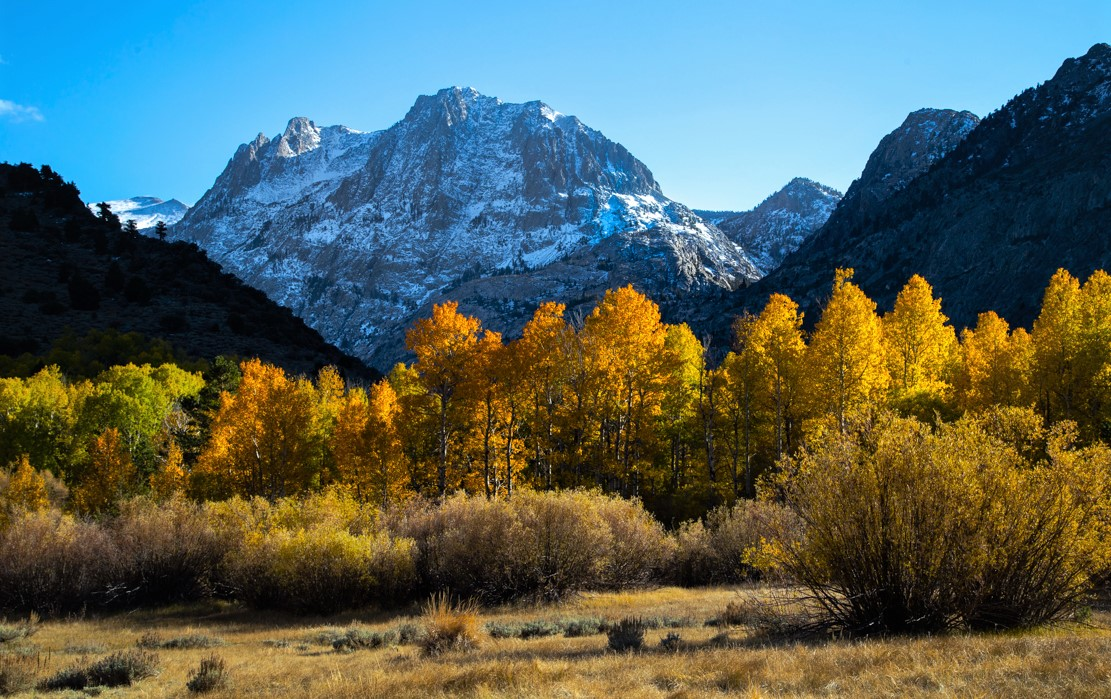
Carson Peak in autumn

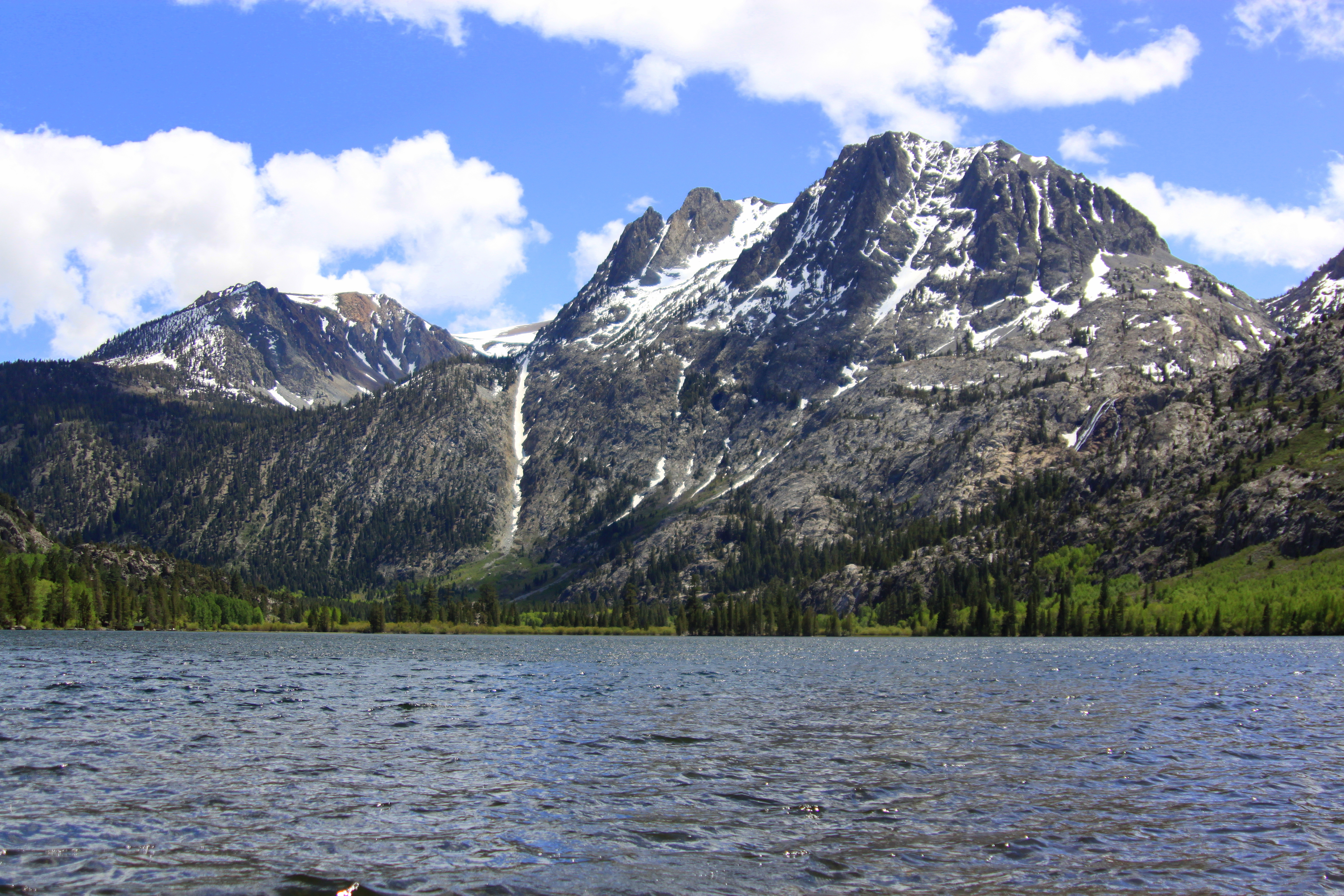
The north chute, aka "Devils Slide", is the conspicuous line

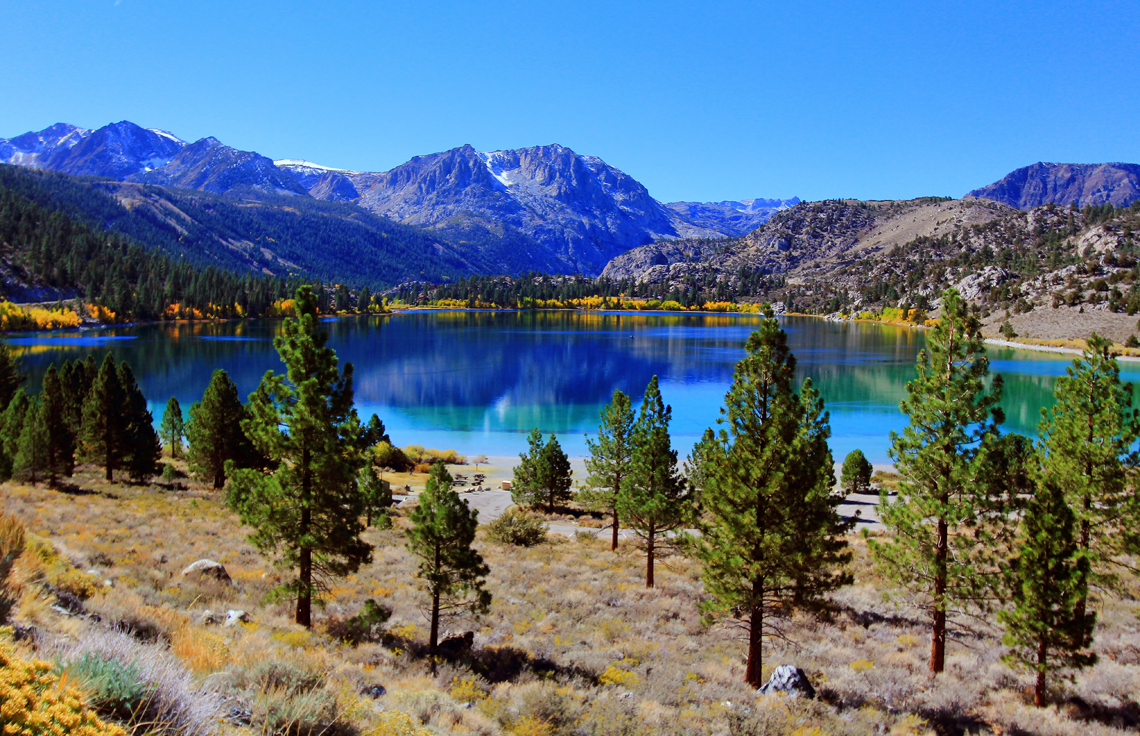
Carson Peak centered beyond June Lake

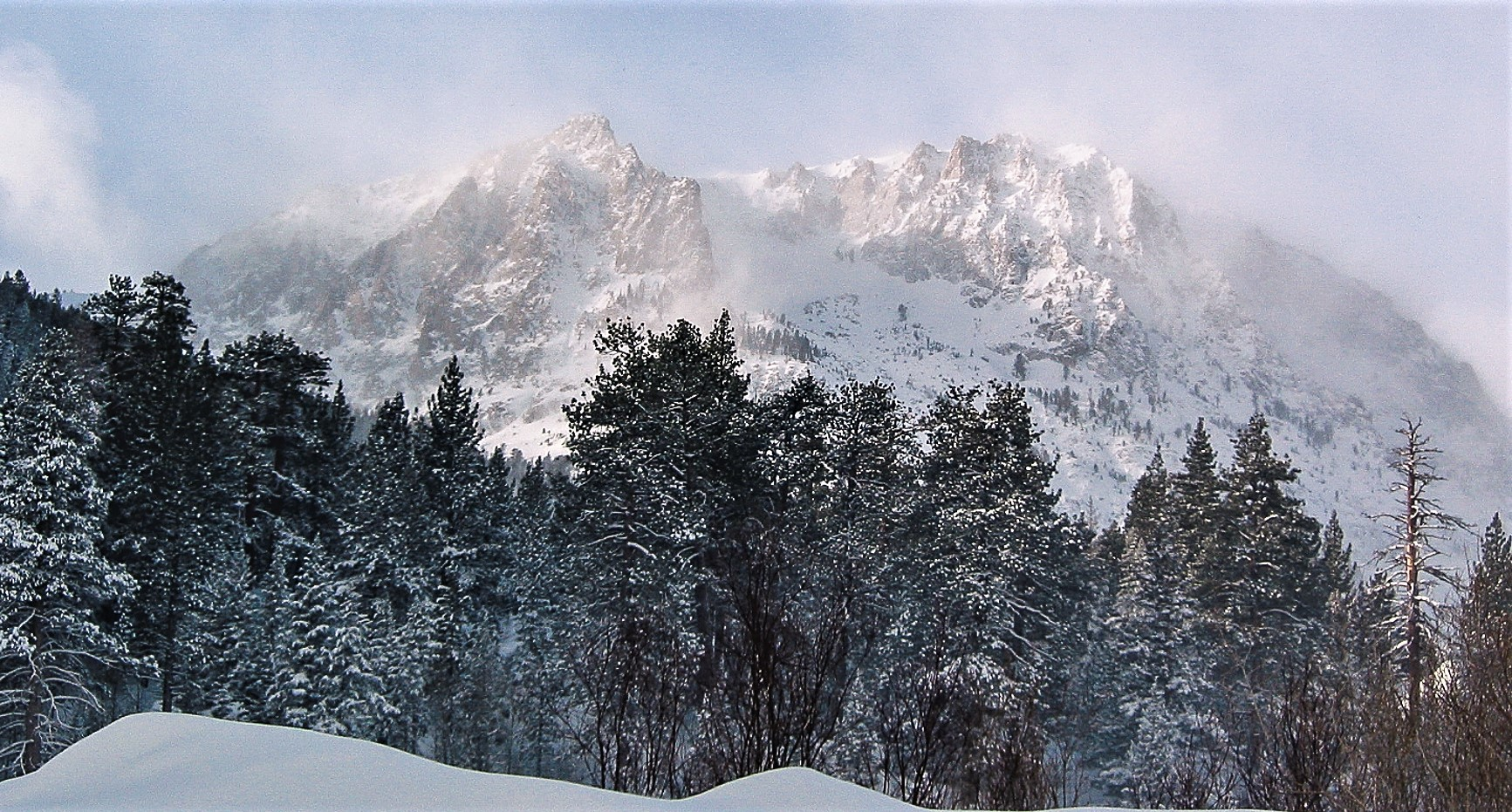
Northeast aspect in winter

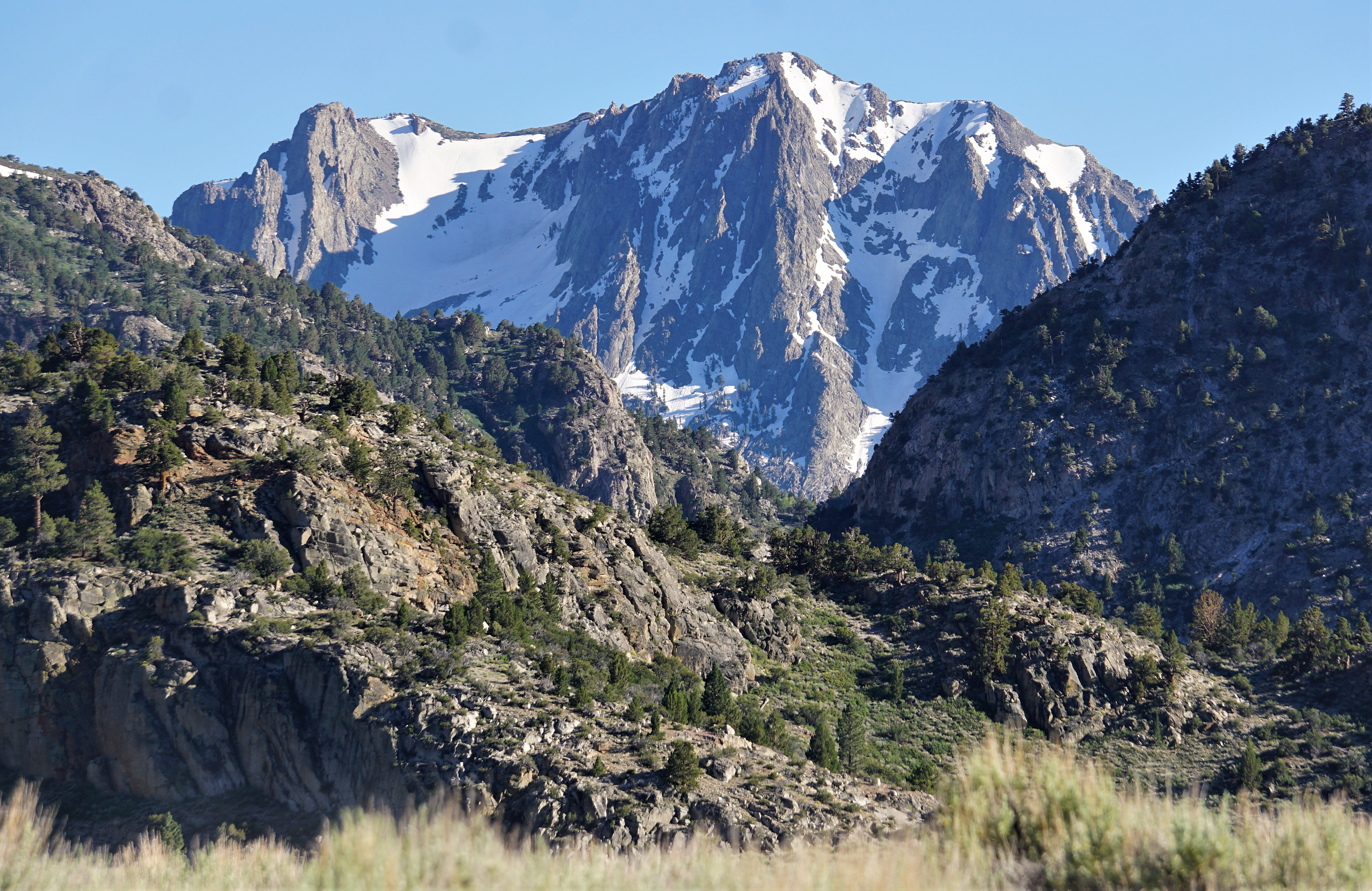

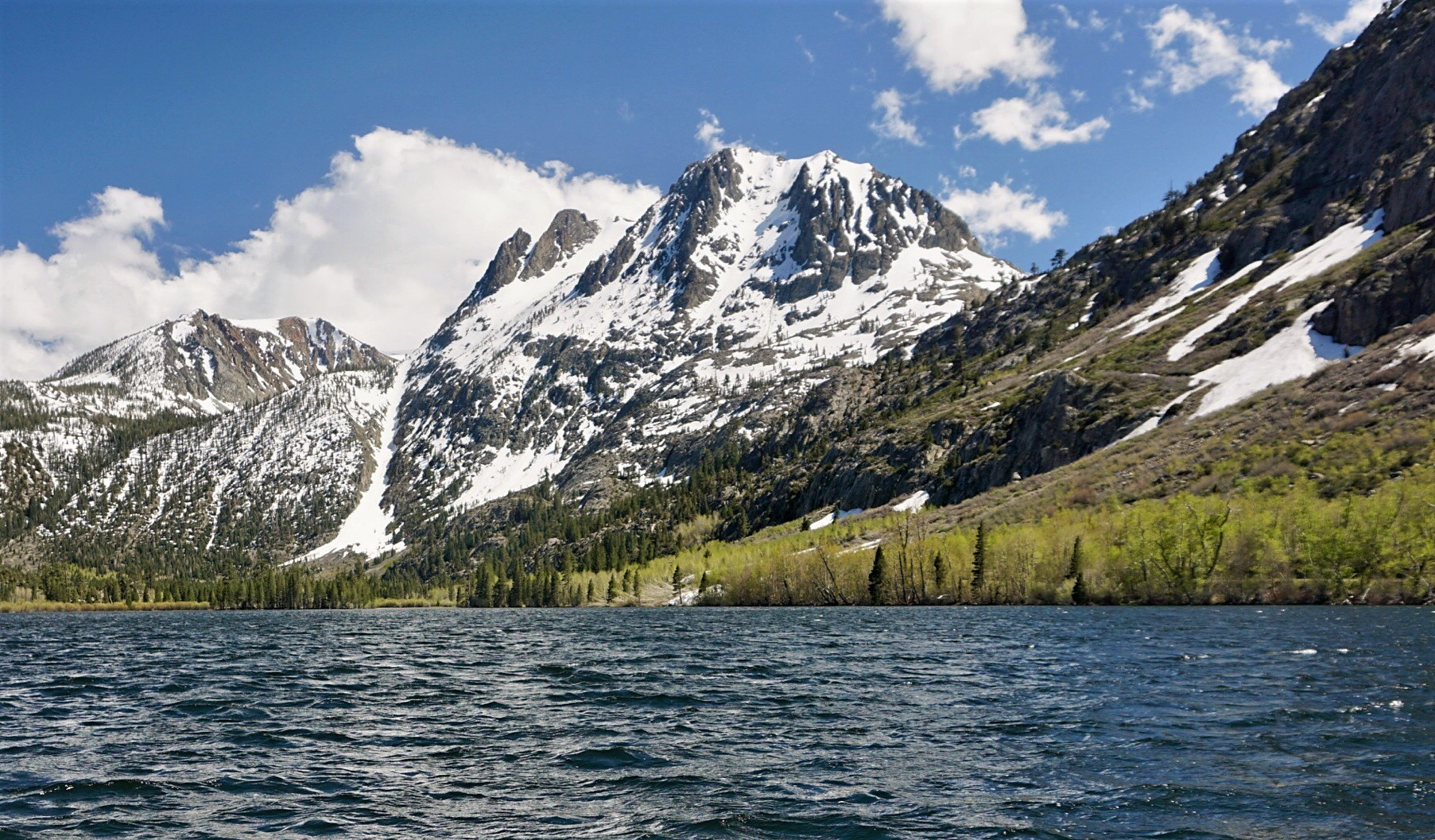

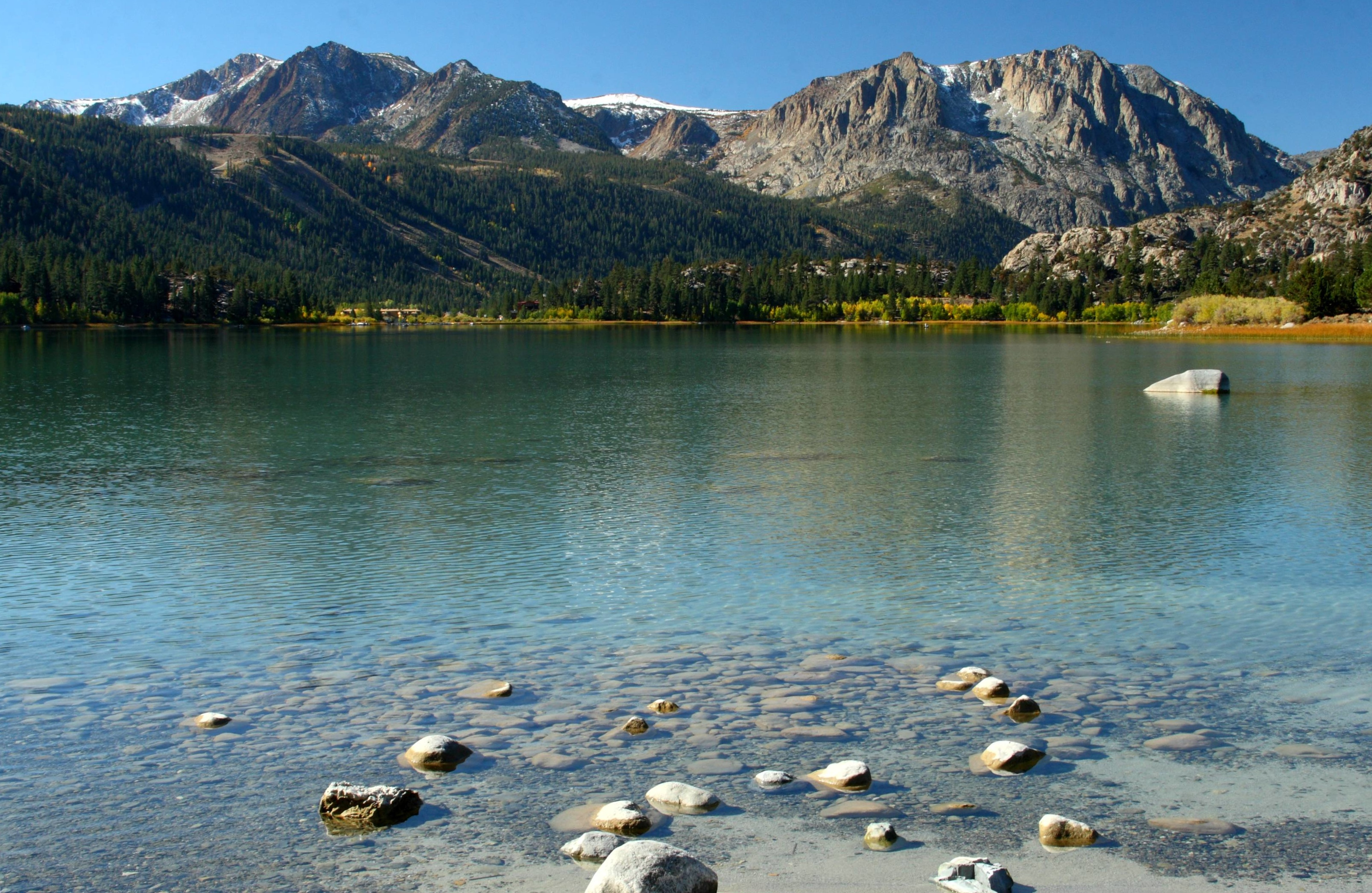
San Joaquin Mountain (left), Carson Peak (right) from June Lake

== See also ==
- List of mountain peaks of California
