= Alger =

Alger may refer to:

== Places ==
=== Algeria ===
- French name for Algiers, the capital of Algeria
  - Roman Catholic Archdiocese of Alger
- Alger (department), a former French department (1848–1962)

=== United States ===
- Alger, Michigan, an unincorporated community
- Alger County, Michigan, in the Upper Peninsula
- Alger, Minnesota, an unincorporated community
- Alger, Ohio, a village
- Alger, Washington, a census-designated place
- Alger Creek, California
- Alger Falls, Michigan
- Alger Island (New York)
- Alger Lakes, California
- Camp Alger, Virginia, a military camp established in 1898 for the Spanish–American War
- Alger Correctional Facility, Michigan, a men's prison

=== Elsewhere ===
- Alger Island, Russia
- Alger Island, one of the Wessel Islands in the Northern Territory of Australia

== Other uses ==
- Alger (name), a list of people with the surname or given name
- Alger brush, an ophthalmological tool
- Alger Theater, Detroit, Michigan, United States
- Commonwealth v. Alger, an 1851 court case in Massachusetts
- MC Alger, a football club based in Algiers
- USM Alger, a football club based in Algiers
- USS Alger (DE-101), a United States Navy World War II destroyer escort
- "Alger", a song by Jean Leloup from his 1989 album Menteur
