= Battle of Biskra (1401) =

Battle in Algeria

- Part of Hafsid–arab war
Date	1401
Location	Biskra, Algeria
Result	Hafsid victory: End of Zab Emirate

Belligerents
Hafsid dynasty	Zab Emirate

Commanders and leaders
Abu Faris Abd al-Aziz II	Ahmed Ben Yusuf Ben Mozni (POW)

Strength
Unknown	Unknown

Casualties and losses
Unknown	Unknown

The Battle of Biskra took place in 1401 between the Zab Emirate and the Hafsid Dynasty, and ended with the defeat of the Emirate of Zab and the capture of the governor of Biskra, Ahmed ben Yusuf ben Monzi.

== Background ==
Originally, Biskra was governed by the family of the Banu Ruman, who, after a war against the family of the Banu Monzi, were expelled from the city. This marked the beginning of the Zab Emirate.

From 1309 to 1311, Sultan Abu Yahya Abu Bakr II appointed Mansour Ibn Fadl as Emir of Biskra. He greatly contributed to the hostilities between the Hafsids and the governors of the Zab, as he supported independence movements in Gabes. Given that he had already supported independence movements in Gabes, between 1309 and 1312 a rebellion broke out in Constantine against the Sultan of Tunis. This uprising was only loosely supported by Mansour Ibn Fadl, who backed a rebel named Baji bin Khalid.

Relations between the Hafsids and Ibn Monzi deteriorated further in 1377 when the Qaid Nabil appointed another judge, even though judges were supposed to be appointed by the sultan through a royal decree. This already showed clear signs that relations between the Hafsids and the Banu Monzi had broken down.

Ibn Monzi was the governor of Biskra and held an important position, as he controlled the subsidies between the Hafsid and the government of Fez. According to the accounts of Ibn Khaldun, who had been invited to Biskra by Ibn Monzi, at the beginning, Ibn Khaldun was well received by him, who provided him with financial support and assistance through his influence, however, he latter felt threatened by Ibn Khaldun's growing influence. He thus appears as a jealous and power-conscious figure, wary of potential rivals. Moreover, Ahmed Al Monzi, although an ally of the Hafsids, repeatedly attempted to rally the governor of Tlemcen, Abu Hammu Musa I, against the Sultan of Tunis.

== Battle ==
On August 11, 1401, the Sultan of Tunis conquered the city of Biskra and stopped around Bir el Kahina. He captured Ahmed Ben Yusuf Ibn Monzi and replaced him with a member of his own government.

== Aftermath ==
Abu Faris Abd al-Aziz II, after installing a member of his government at the head of Biskra, continued his expansionist campaigns, the most famous of which took place in Alger in 1410 and, about ten years later, in Tlemcen. He also fought the Portuguese in naval battles in the waters around Ceuta.

== Sources ==
- Brunschwig, Robert (1988). History of Africa in the Hafsid Era From the 13th to the end of the 15th century Translated into Arabic by Hammadi Al-Sahli. Academic series. Dar al-Gharb al-islami.
- Rutten, Margarett (1984). History of Babylon. Awidat Publications.
- Lacoste, Yves (1984). Ibn Khaldun: The Birth of History and the Past of the Third World. Verso Books. ISBN 978-0-86091-084-8.
- Edmond, Fagnan (1895). Chronique des Almohades et des Hafçides. Adolphe Braham.
- Fierro, Maribel (2010). The New Cambridge History of Islam, Volume 2: The Western Islamic World, Eleventh to Eighteenth Centuries. Cambridge University Press. ISBN 978-0-521-83957-0.
