= Alger Island =

Alger Island may refer to:

- Alger Island, New York, part of the Fulton Chain of Lakes in the Adirondack Park in Herkimer County
- Alger Island, Russia, an island in Franz Josef Land
- One of the Wessel Islands in the Northern Territory of Australia

== See also ==
- Alger (disambiguation)
