= Alger Creek =

Stream in Mississippi, USA

Alger Creek Tributary to Rush Creek
- Location of Alger Creek mouth Alger Creek (the United States)

Location
- Country: United States
- State: California
- County: Mono

Physical characteristics
- Source: Parker Creek divide
  - location: about 1.5 miles south of Parker Peak
  - coordinates: 37°48′35″N 119°11′31″W
  - elevation: 11,090 ft (3,380 m)
- Mouth: Rush Creek
  - location: about 4 miles west of June Lake, California
  - coordinates: 37°46′51″N 119°07′38″W
  - elevation: 7,231 ft (2,204 m)
- Length: 4.70 mi (7.56 km)
- Basin size: 5.73 square miles (14.8 km^{2})
- Discharge
  - location: Rush Creek
  - average: 6.95 cu ft/s (0.197 m^{3}/s) at mouth with Rush Creek

Basin features
- Progression: Rush Creek → Mono Lake
- River system: Rush Creek
- Tributaries
  - left: unnamed tributaries
  - right: unnamed tributaries
- Bridges: CA 158

Alger Creek is a stream in Mono County, California, in the United States.

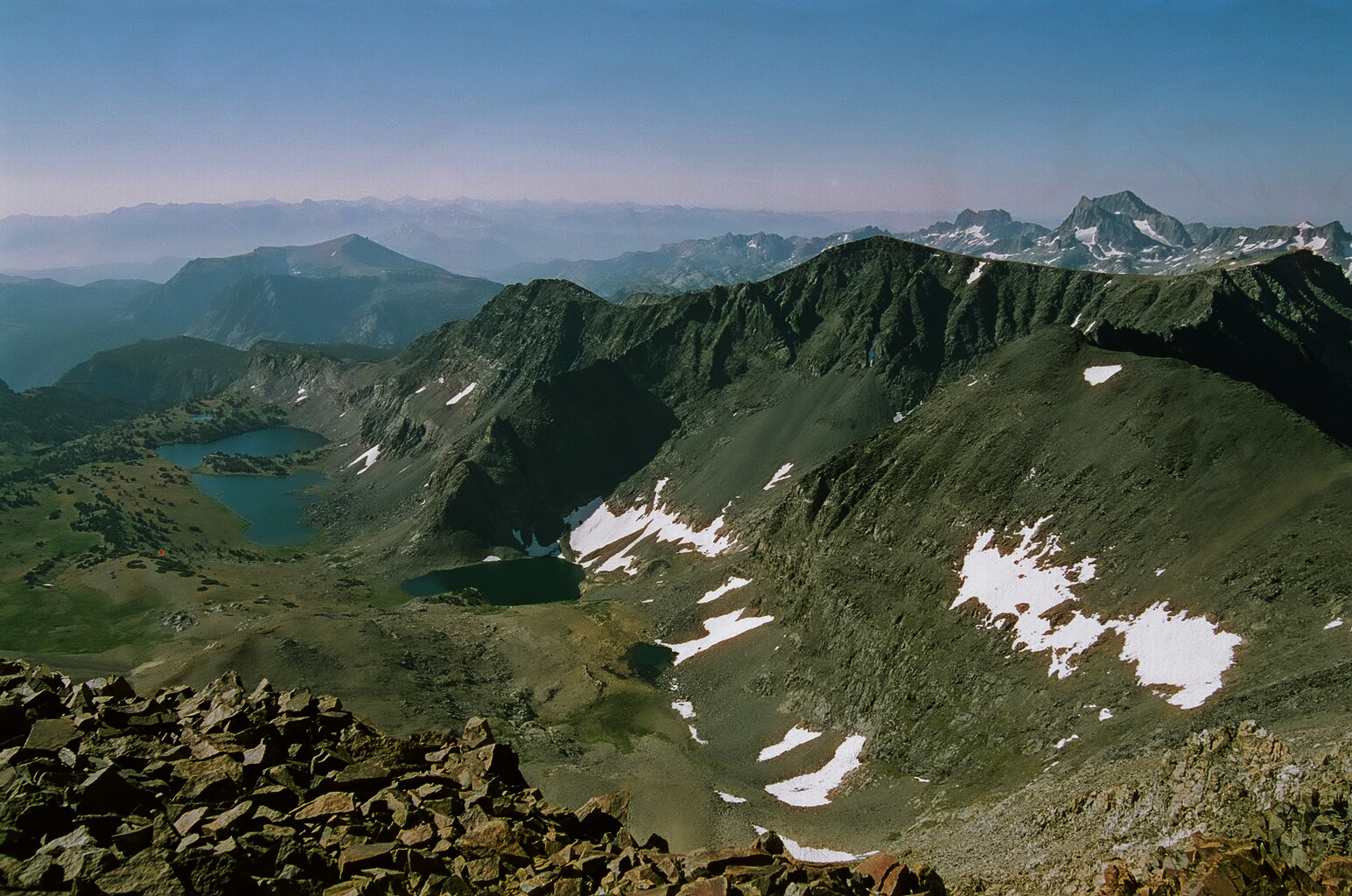
Alger creek basin as seen from Koip peak

Alger Creek took its name from Alger Lakes.

== See also ==
- List of rivers of California
