= June Lake (California) =

Lake in the Sierra Nevada of California

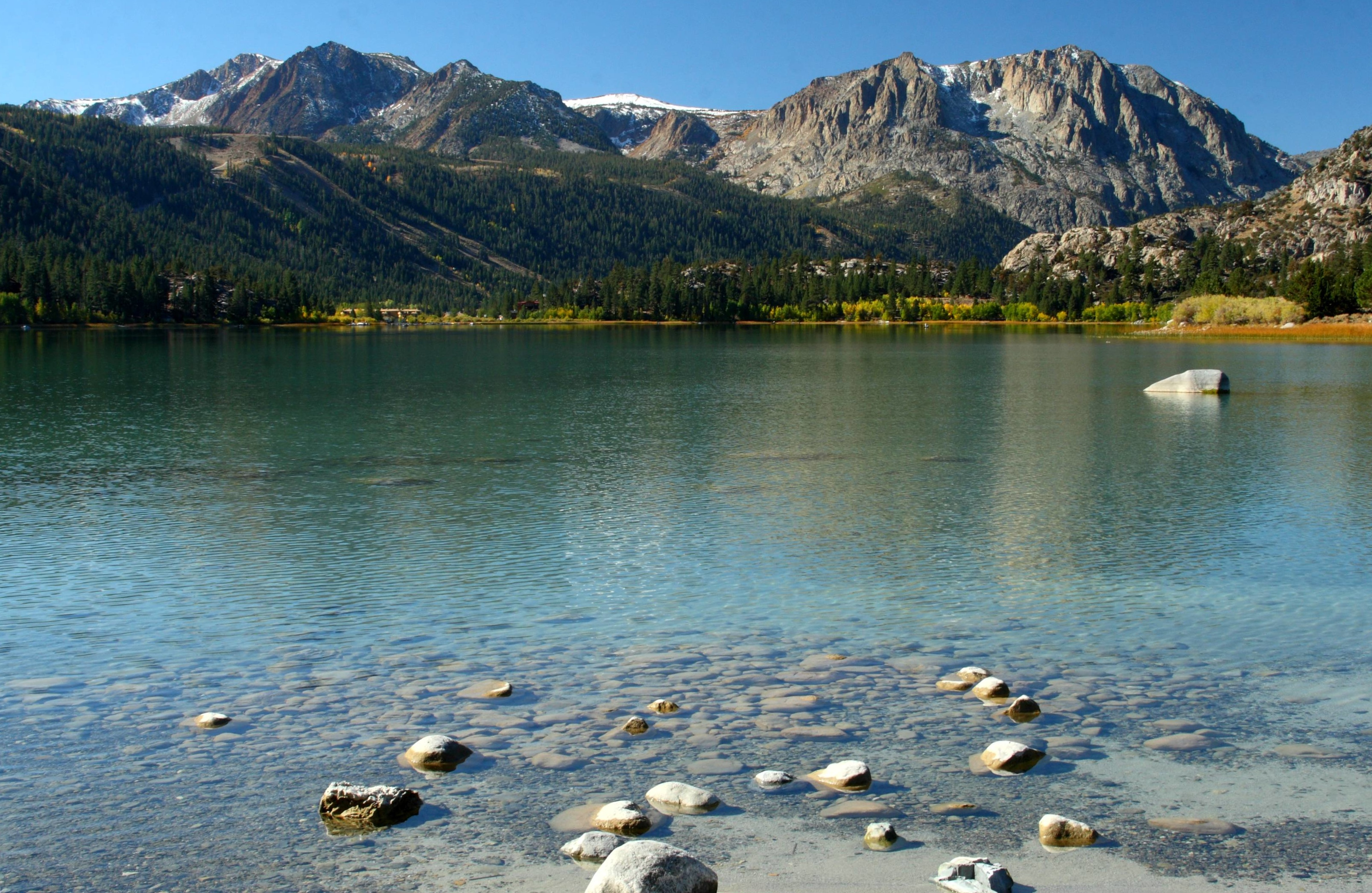

- Location within California Location within the United States
- Location: Inyo National Forest; Mono County, California
- Coordinates: 37°47′19″N 119°04′28″W
- Basin countries: United States
- Max. length: 1.2 mi (1.9 km)
- Max. width: 0.6 mi (0.97 km)
- Average depth: 60 ft (18 m)
- Max. depth: 168 ft (51 m)
- Surface elevation: 7,621 ft (2,323 m)
- Settlements: June Lake, California
- References: U.S. Geological Survey Geographic Names Information System: June Lake (California)

June Lake is a subalpine lake within the Inyo National Forest, in Mono County, eastern California. It is at an elevation of 7,621 ft (2,323 m) in the Eastern Sierra Nevada.

== Geography ==
It is located 20 mi (32 km) north from Mammoth Lakes and 15 mi (24 km) south from Lee Vining, California. It is one of the four lakes (June Lake, Gull Lake, Silver Lake & Grant Lake) inside the June Lake Loop. It is located about 5 mi (8.0 km) south of the southern end of Mono Lake following U.S. Route 395 and then 2 mi (3.2 km) west on State Route 158.

== Activities ==
Fishing is considered one of the favorite summer sports. A small population of Lahontan cutthroat trout can be found in June Lake. In the 1960s rainbow trout were plentiful. There are two marinas at June Lake: June Lake Marina and Big Rock Resort.

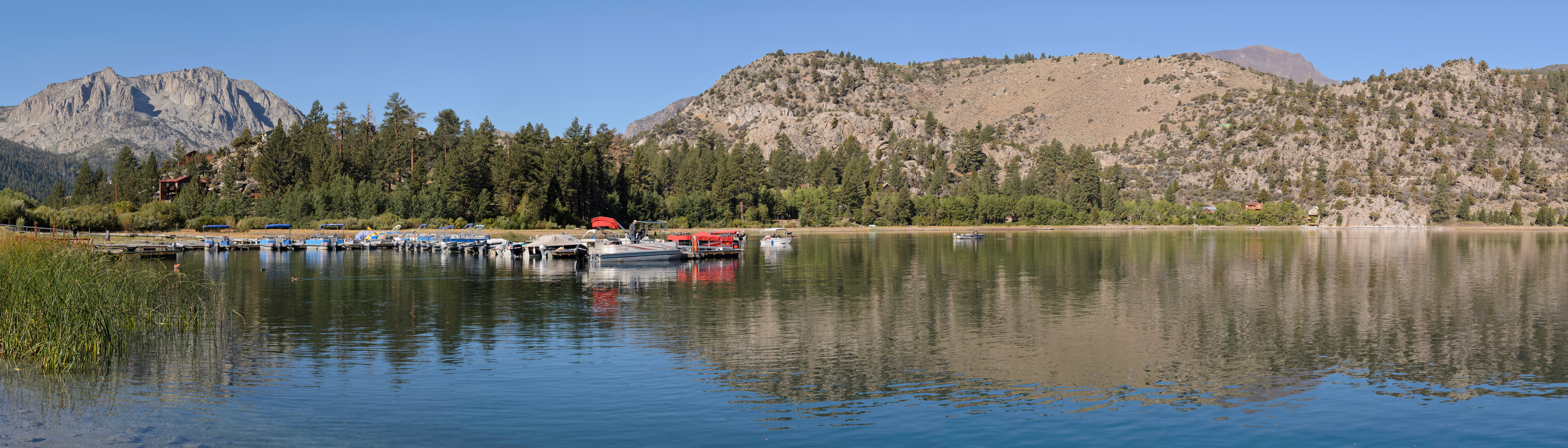
Panorama of June Lake in September 2016.

== See also ==
- List of lakes in California
