= Abby Langdon Alger =

American writer

- Born: August 3, 1850; Roxbury, Massachusetts
- Died: May 22, 1905 (aged 54); Brookline, Massachusetts
- Occupations: Writer, translator
- Father: William Rounseville Alger
- Relatives: Philip Rounseville Alger (brother)

Abby Langdon Alger (August 3, 1850 – May 22, 1905) was an American writer and translator, mainly of religious, literary, or folklore texts.

== Early life ==
Alger was born in Roxbury, Massachusetts, the daughter of Unitarian clergyman William Rounseville Alger and Anna Langdon Lodge Alger. Writer Horatio Alger was her father's cousin, and statesman Henry Cabot Lodge was one of her maternal cousins. Her brother Philip Rounseville Alger was a Naval officer; another brother, William E. Alger, was a diplomat who worked at American embassies in Latin America. Her niece and namesake, Abby Langdon Alger Wilder (1889–1978), was a prominent state official in New Hampshire.

== Career ==
Alger translated religious, literary, and folklore texts from Italian, French, and German, including works by historian Henri Martin, dramatist Ernest Legouvé, Benôit-Constant Conquelin, Judith Gautier, novelist Victor Hugo, Auguste Joseph Alphonse Gratry, philosopher Ernest Renan, Saint Francis of Assisi, scientist Louis Figuier, and dramatist X. B. Saintine. "She was a remarkable linguist and had French, German, Italian, and other tongues at her instant command," noted a 1905 obituary in the Boston Evening Transcript. "Possessing this valuable attainment, she was frequently in demand among publishing houses, for which she did much translating."

Alger also produced a benefit performance of a miracle play, based on Italian traditions, performed with Italian musicians and puppeteers, at Boston's Minot Hall in 1894. "It was my wish," she later explained, "to show the earliest form of dramatic representation. We, of the present, may call it rough and grotesque; but when one remembers that it was a faithful reproduction of what was given hundreds of years ago, and that it was then received with every mark of reverence, I am sure there will be no adverse criticism." She interviewed Passamaquoddy and Penobscot elders to compile In Indian Tents (1897), a collection of folktales.

== Publications ==
=== Original works ===
- "A collection of words and phrases taken from the Passamaquoddy tongue" (1885, paper presented to the American Philosophical Society)
- In Indian Tents: Stories Told by Penobscot, Passamaquoddy and Mimac Indians (1897)

=== Translations ===
- Martin, A popular history of France, from the first Revolution to the present time (1877)
- Legouvé, Reading as a fine art (1879)
- Coquelin, The actor and his art (1881)
- Gautier, The usurper: an episode in Japanese history (1884)
- Reissman, The life and works of Robert Schumann (1886)
- Hugo, The Hunchback of Notre-Dame (1888) and Hans of Iceland (1891)
- Gratry, Guide to the knowledge of God, a study of the chief theodicies (1892)
- Figuier, Joys beyond the threshold: A sequel to The to-morrow of death (1893)
- Bentzon, The Condition of Woman in the United States: A Traveler's Notes (1895)
- Renan, My Sister Henriette (1895)
- La Motte Fouqué, Undine, a Tale (1897)
- The little flowers of Saint Francis of Assisi (1898)
- Saintine, Picciola (1899)

== Personal life ==
Alger died after an operation in a Brookline hospital in 1905, at the age of 54, a few months after her father's death.
