= California State Route 158 =

Highway in California

State Route 158
- June Lake Loop
- Map of Mono County in eastern California with SR 158 highlighted in red

Route information
- Maintained by Caltrans
- Length: 15.828 mi (25.473 km)
- Restrictions: Segment from June Lake north to June Lake Loop North Junction closed in winter

Major junctions
- South end: US 395 at June Lake Junction
- North end: US 395 / SR 120 at June Lake Loop North Junction

Location
- Country: United States
- State: California
- Counties: Mono

Highway system
- State highways in California; Interstate; US; State; Scenic; History; Pre‑1964; Unconstructed; Deleted; Freeways
← SR 157	→ SR 159

State Route 158 (SR 158) is a state highway in the U.S. state of California. Known as the June Lake Loop, it is a loop route of U.S. Route 395 in Mono County that serves the community of June Lake.

== Route description ==
Route 158 is defined in section 458 of the California Streets and Highways Code, and that the highway is "from Route 395 near June Lake to Route 395 near Rush Creek, via the vicinity of June Lake, Silver Lake and Grant Lake".

SR 158 is a loop west off of U.S. Route 395 passing through the community of June Lake, following the watercourse of June Lake, Gull Lake, Reversed Creek, Silver Lake, Rush Creek and Grant Lake, into the Mono Basin. The highway provides access to several vacation areas, trailheads, and scenic locations, including the June Mountain ski and snowboard resort.

SR 158 from 3.5 miles (5.6 km) north of June Lake to the northern junction with U.S. Highway 395 is closed during winters, typically from mid-December through mid-April.

SR 158 is not part of the National Highway System, a network of highways that are considered essential to the country's economy, defense, and mobility by the Federal Highway Administration.

== Major intersections ==
Except where prefixed with a letter, postmiles were measured on the road as it was in 1964, based on the alignment that existed at the time, and do not necessarily reflect current mileage. Postmile prefixes include: R reflecting a realignment in the route since then, M indicating a second realignment, L referring to an overlap due to a correction or change, and T indicating postmiles classified as temporary. Segments that remain unconstructed or have been relinquished to local control may be omitted. The entire route is in Mono County.

Location	Postmile	Destinations	Notes
June Lake Junction	0.00	US 395 – Lee Vining, Bishop	South end of SR 158
June Lake	5.94	Northbound winter closure gate	
June Lake Loop North Junction	15.55	Southbound winter closure gate	
June Lake Loop North Junction	15.84	US 395 (SR 120) – Lee Vining, Bishop	North end of SR 158
1.000 mi = 1.609 km; 1.000 km = 0.621 mi
