= San Joaquin Mountain =

Mountain in Mono County, California, United States

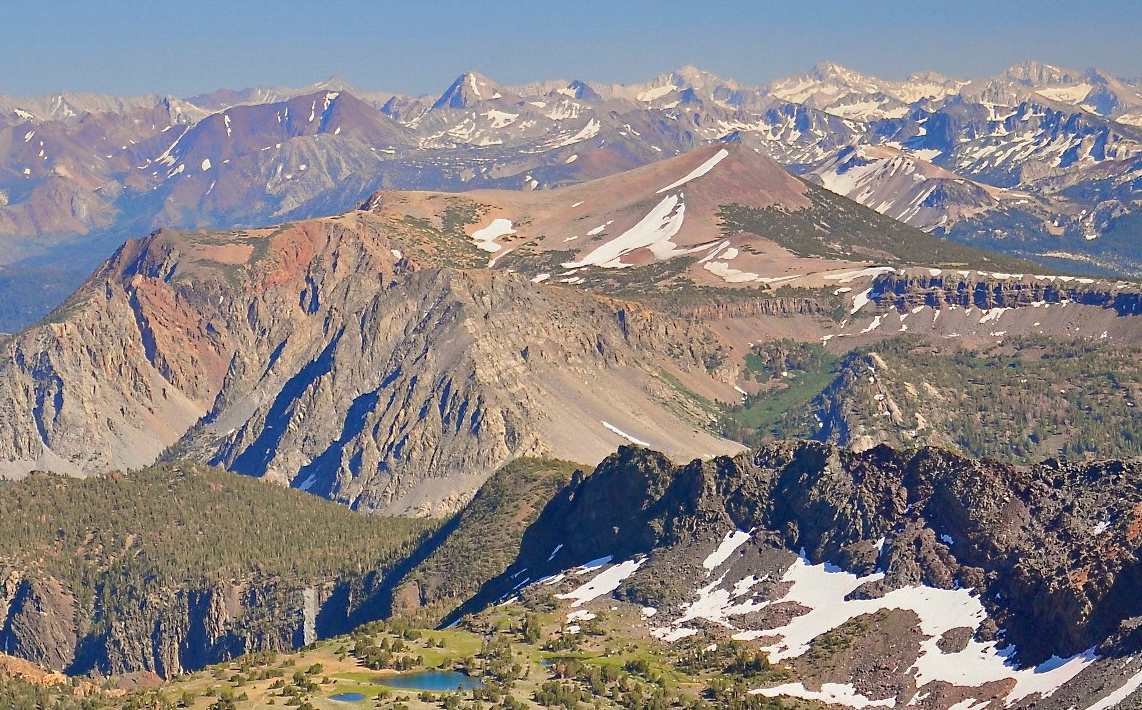
- San Joaquin Mountain, middle background, as seen from the north

Highest point
- Elevation: 11,606 ft (3,538 m)
- Prominence: 1,674 ft (510 m)
- Listing: Mountains of California
- Coordinates: 37°43′08.4″N 119°06′21.9″W

Geography
- Location within California

San Joaquin Mountain is a mountain along the Sierra Crest, near June Lake, California. It is the twenty-sixth highest peak in California, and is the highest peak along the Sierra Crest for 25 miles (40 km). The mountain is formed of quartz latite that erupted during the Pliocene.

The mountain can be climbed as a dayhike from Minaret Summit.
