= USS Alger =

Cannon-class destroyer escort

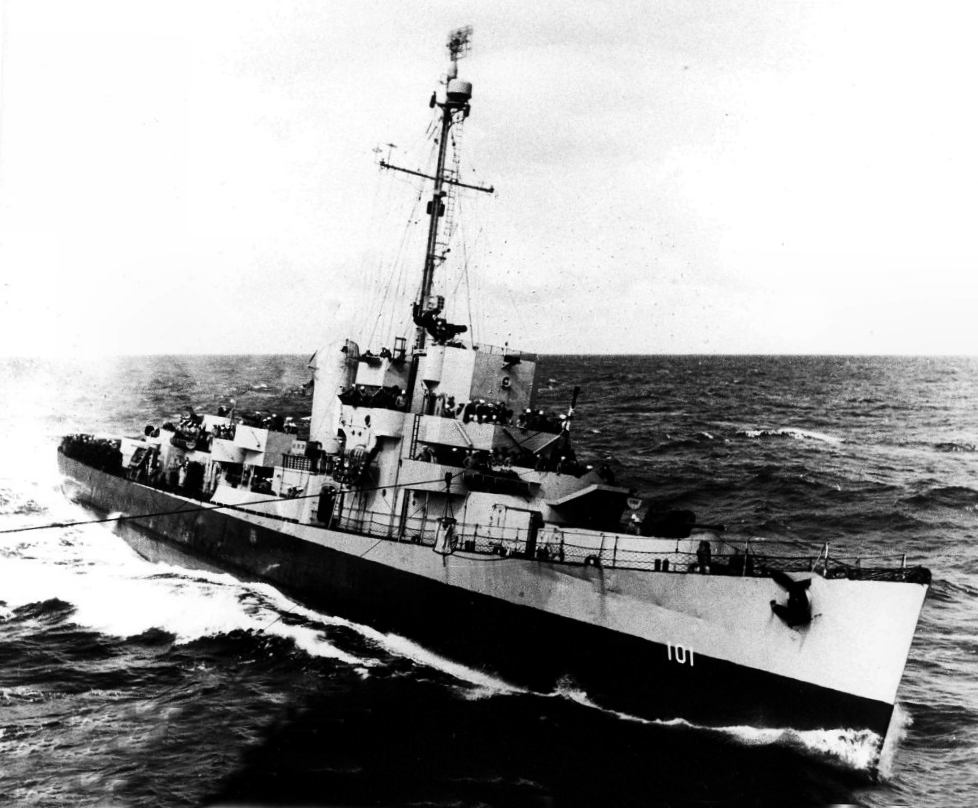
- USS Alger underway at sea, circa 1944

History

United States
- Name: Alger
- Namesake: Philip Rounsevile Alger
- Builder: Dravo Corporation, Wilmington, Delaware
- Laid down: 2 January 1943
- Launched: 8 July 1943
- Commissioned: 12 November 1943
- Decommissioned: 10 March 1945
- Stricken: 20 July 1953
- Fate: Transferred to Brazil 10 March 1945

Brazil
- Name: NAe Babitonga
- Acquired: 10 March 1945
- Out of service: 1964
- Identification: D-16
- Fate: Stricken and scrapped, 1964

General characteristics
- Class & type: Cannon-class destroyer escort
- Displacement: 1,240 long tons (1,260 t)
- Length: 306 ft (93 m)
- Beam: 36 ft 8 in (11.2 m)
- Draft: 8 ft 9 in (2.7 m)
- Installed power: 6,000 hp (4,500 kW) (diesels); 4,500 kW (6,000 hp) (electric motors)
- Propulsion: 4 × GM Mod. 16-278A diesel engines with electric drive; 2 × screws
- Speed: 21 kn (39 km/h; 24 mph)
- Range: 10,800 nmi (12,400 mi; 20,000 km) at 12 kn (22 km/h; 14 mph)
- Complement: 15 officers, 201 enlisted
- Armament: 3 × 3 in (76 mm)/50 guns (3×1); 2 × 40 mm Bofors AA guns (1x2); 8 × 20 mm Oerlikon AA guns (8×1); 3 × Torpedo tubes for 21-inch Mark 15 torpedo (1×3); 8 × depth charge projectors; 1 × Hedgehog anti-submarine mortar; 2 x depth charge tracks

USS Alger (DE-101) was a Cannon-class destroyer escort built for the U.S. Navy during World War II. She served in the Battle of the Atlantic and provided escort service against submarine and air attack for Navy vessels and convoys. Alger was named for Philip Rounsevile Alger.

She was laid down on 2 January 1943 by the Dravo Corp., Wilmington, Delaware; launched on 8 July 1943; sponsored by Miss Louisa Rodgers Alger; and commissioned at the Philadelphia Navy Yard on 12 November 1943.

== Service history ==
On 30 November, Alger sailed for Bermuda and shakedown. She returned to Philadelphia for post-shakedown availability, then headed for the Caribbean on 15 January 1944, and arrived at Trinidad on 21 January. There, she was assigned to Task Group (TG) 42.5 and departed on the 31st in the screen of a convoy bound for Recife, Brazil. While en route, Alger collided with a merchantman and sustained slight damage to her bow. However, she continued on to Brazil and reached Recife on 14 February.

Upon her arrival there, the ship was assigned to Task Group 41.5 for patrol duty along the Brazilian coast which she carried out until 1 June. On that day, Alger departed Recife to escort a convoy to Trinidad. She reached that island on 8 June and then sailed back to Recife with another convoy.

On 17 July, Alger joined the screen of the escort carrier Solomons and sailed for anti-submarine warfare exercises off the coast of Brazil. She then resumed patrol duty and continued that work through most of November. Alger rendezvoused at sea on the last day of the month with Task Group 42.3 and escorted a convoy to Rio de Janeiro.

On 28 December, the ship departed Recife to escort another convoy to Trinidad but returned to Recife on 30 January 1945. The next day, Alger was relieved of operational duties in preparation for her transfer to the government of Brazil on loan.

After various inspections and exercises at sea, Alger departed Recife on 23 February and moored the same day at Natal, Brazil.

=== Decommissioning ===
On 10 March 1945, Alger was decommissioned and loaned to the Brazilian Navy. Her name was struck from the Navy Directory on 20 July 1953, and title to the ship was transferred outright to the government of Brazil as Babitonga (D-16). She was stricken and scrapped in 1964.
