= Alger brush =

An Alger brush is an ophthalmological tool used to remove small foreign bodies from a patient's eye. It is commonly used to remove rust rings from a cornea.

== Description ==
An Alger brush is a small rotary brush powered by a battery. The brush contains a small burr that is capable of penetrating an eye's corneal stroma to reach small foreign objects lodged in the cornea, such as rust rings.
