= June Lake, California =

- Census-designated place
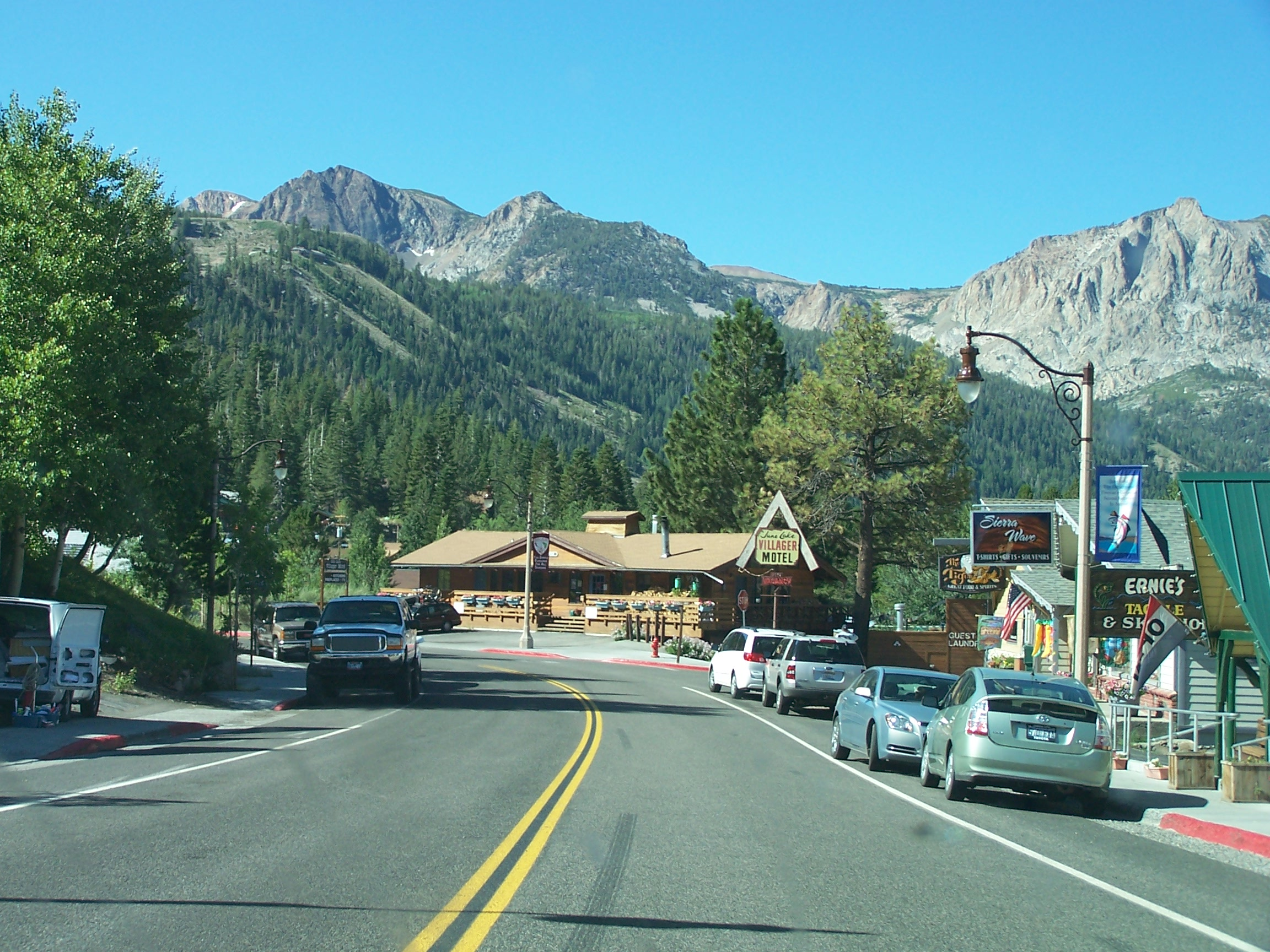
- June Lake

- Location in Mono County, California

- Location within California Location within the United States
- Coordinates: 37°45′04″N 119°06′50″W
- Country: United States
- State: California
- County: Mono

Area
  - Total: 11.10 sq mi (28.74 km^{2})
  - Land: 10.31 sq mi (26.69 km^{2})
  - Water: 0.79 sq mi (2.05 km^{2}) 7.12%
- Elevation: 7,786 ft (2,373 m)

Population (2020)
  - Total: 611
- Time zone: UTC-8 (Pacific)
  - Summer (DST): UTC-7 (PDT)
- ZIP code: 93529
- Area codes: 442/760
- GNIS feature ID: 2583044

June Lake is an unincorporated community and census-designated place (CDP) in Mono County, California, United States. It is located against the southern rim of the Mono Basin, 12.5 miles (20 km) south of Lee Vining.

The majority of the developed community is spread narrowly along a five-mile stretch of California State Route 158, known as the June Lake Loop Road, or in the populated areas, Boulder Drive. The Mono County Community Development Department defines June Lake's planning area to encompass the entire June Lake Loop, including the section of U.S. Route 395 between the north and south junctions of the Loop Road. However, the June Lake census-designated place, for which population figures are published by the U.S. Census Bureau, consists of the area along State Route 158 from its southern intersection with US 395, southwest past June Lake and Gull Lake to Silver Lake.

The population of the CDP was 611 at the 2020 census. In the summer, the population can grow by an estimated 2,500 visitors; the population increase includes fishermen, campers, tourists, backpackers, and other outdoors enthusiasts.

== Geology and geography ==
The June Lake Loop is situated against the west rim of the Great Basin and Range Province, abutting the steep eastern escarpment of the Sierra Nevada. Rush Creek originates from an alpine watershed just north of the headwaters of the San Joaquin River, and south of the Tuolumne River, then flows northeast, becoming the major tributary to Mono Lake.

June Lake's looped valley, often described as a horseshoe-shaped canyon, was formed by glacial action. The Rush Creek glacier split in two when it encountered the resistant rock of what is now known as Reversed Peak. The main glacier flowed toward the north creating the Rush Creek Canyon. Another glacial branch turned south and east, but its flow was impeded and eventually stopped as the granitic bedrock on this southern branch created an uphill path toward the volcanic area of the Mono Craters. When the glacier receded it left behind terminal moraine material in the area now known as Oh! Ridge.

A basin which had been carved out just west of the ridge is filled with spring water, creating June Lake and nearby Gull Lake. The overflow from these spring-fed lakes flows back toward the mountain range and thus is named Reversed Creek. Reversed Creek reaches a confluence with Rush Creek and flows through Silver Lake and Grant Lake, completing the "loop" to the Mono Basin.

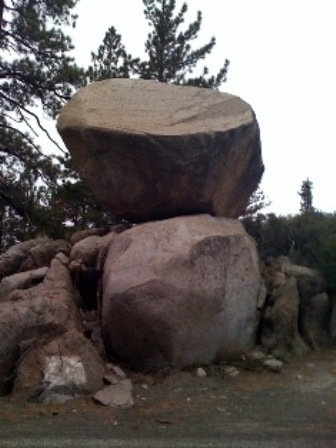
Perched Boulder

One notable geologic feature is the perched boulder, a glacial erratic next to the June Lake Fire Station. This boulder, a well-known landmark of the area, is 18 feet (5.5 m) tall and weighs 150 tons. It was carried and deposited by glacial action to its present position.

June Lake contains several distinct community areas. The main village is between the southwestern end of June Lake and the northeast end of the smaller Gull Lake. The Village is the commercial core, with a post office, community center, library, restaurants, lodging, stores and offices, as well as mixed residential use. The West Village/Rodeo Grounds area lies on the north and west sides of Gull Lake. These areas are sites of more recent development including a baseball field, condominiums, and some larger homes. Over ninety acres of vacant land in this area are currently involved in a specific plan process. June Mountain Ski Area, adjacent to the Rodeo Grounds property, is owned and operated by Mammoth Mountain LLC under a use permit from the Inyo National Forest. Down canyon and closer to the dramatic eastern scarp of the Sierra Nevada are the Petersen, Williams, and Clark tracts, then directly at the base of Carson Peak are the Dream Mountain and Silver Lake Meadow areas as well as the Rush Creek Power House. These "down canyon" areas are primarily single-family residential although several commercial nodes exist containing retail, lodging, dining and other services.

There are also several outlying inhabited areas which are under lease from the Forest Service. These include the June Lake Junction and Pine Cliff Resort to the northeast of June Lake; Silver Lake Resort; the Silver Lake Recreation Residence Tract; and the Grant Lake Campground and Marina. At the northern junction of the Loop road with U.S. Highway 395 is the Cain Ranch, on property owned by the City of Los Angeles.

According to the United States Census Bureau, the CDP covers an area of 11.1 square miles (29 km^{2}), of which 10.3 square miles (27 km^{2}) are land and 0.8 square miles (2.1 km^{2}), or 7.12%, are water.

=== Climate ===
This region experiences warm (but not hot) and mostly dry summers (with a few thunderstorms in late summer), and cold, extremely snowy winters with no average monthly temperatures above 71.6 °F (22.0 °C). According to the Köppen Climate Classification system, June Lake has a warm-summer Mediterranean climate, abbreviated "Csb" on climate maps.

== History ==
The June Lake Loop has attracted fishermen, hunters, and hikers since the late 19th century. Its first inhabitants were the Paiute Indians of the Mono Basin. Although there was abundant mining activity in adjacent areas, the prospectors of the late 19th century found little of interest here. The area remained roadless, and was recognized only for its scenic and recreational value. During the decline of the mining era, interest developed in the new technology of Hydroelectric Energy.

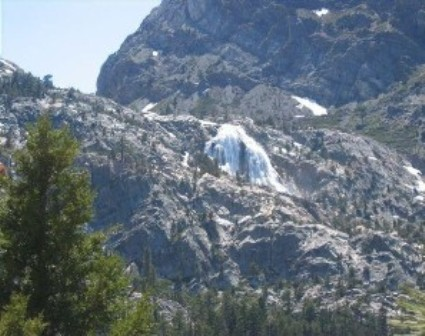
Horsetail Falls above Rush Creek Powerhouse

By 1915 a roadway was constructed up Rush Creek to just past Silver Lake, and a rail tramway system was moved from a defunct mine at nearby Bodie into the steep and rugged mountains above for the construction of two dams to provide Hydroelectric Power. The Rush Creek Hydroelectric Project was a significant step in the development of Hydroelectric Power in the State of California, and the Rush Creek Power House began producing electricity for distant cities in 1916.

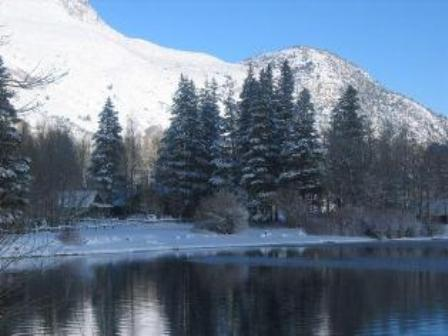
Silver Lake in the winter

The initial construction project continued through 1917, and during this time an employee named Roy Carson started the Loop's first private resort, known as Carson's Camp. The resort was a tent camp until 1920 when the first cabin was completed. A year later, after the completion of the first cabin another two cabins were erected in 1921. The new, larger cabin contained a dining room and a small area for a post office. This cabin is still in use as a store and restaurant for the historic Silver Lake Resort. Circa 1924 the U.S. Forest Service constructed another unpaved roadway from a point along U.S. Highway 395 to June Lake. Eventually Power Station employees and fishermen continued the road to connect with the road in the Silver Lake area. The road from the June Lake Junction made June Lake automobile accessible and made development in that area possible. Housing tracts were formed in between June and Gull Lakes and also near Fern Creek and Silver Lake. Boulder Lodge, on the shore of June Lake, was the second resort to be built in the June Lake Loop. In 1927 the Ed J. Seymour Company announced the construction of June Lake Lodge, (now a timeshare hotel known as the Heidelberg Inn) on the hillside overlooking June and Gull Lakes. The Lodge was to be operated in conjunction with a fish hatchery and fox farm, and included fifty rooms, a restaurant and bar, and a large four-sided fireplace in the lobby. June Lake Lodge opened in May 1928, and the hatchery produced an average of 1,000,000 small fish every year, distributed to the surrounding area's lakes and creeks. The fox farm was located near what is now the Pine Cliff area. Other camps and lodges sprung up, including Gull Lake Lodge, Fern Creek Lodge, Camp Culver, and Cherokee Lodge. Due to a larger volume of travel on Highway 395 a land lease permit was issued to the Carrington family so that they could create a service station with a repair shop and lunch room at the June Lake Junction. They called it "Crater Garage and Lunch Room". With the expansion of the community and its new permanent residents the necessity for a Post Office and school arose. The first United States Post Office in June Lake was established on October 1, 1927, and the first school in 1933. The school was run out of Fern Creek Lodge and the first teacher Mrs. Romana Power earned $1500.00 for a year.

During this period, automobile touring had become quite fashionable, and with the completion of the Tioga Pass Road, June Lake became a popular destination and way point for those traveling between Yosemite and Southern California. Notably, many Los Angeles area dignitaries and Hollywood celebrities made their way here. Film stars Wallace Beery and Raymond Hatton built cabins on Silver Lake. The Beery cabin was on a small island and Beery was known to land his plane on the meadow area adjacent to the lake. Names such as Clark Gable, Charlie Chaplin, Betty Grable, Sally Rand, Marx Brothers and others graced the guest register at the June Lake Lodge. Subsequently, film director Frank Capra and cartoonist Walter Lantz also had cabins at Silver Lake, and their families continue to visit.

The Los Angeles Department of Water and Power since 1923 had been seeking to purchase water rights in the Mono Basin to increase the capabilities of their aqueduct system. And, by 1935, the Mono Basin Project was underway. Water was captured from nearby Parker Creek, Walker Creek and Lee Vining Creek and diverted to Rush Creek at Grant Lake, where a large earthfill dam was constructed. An eleven-mile tunnel was dug under the Mono Craters to deliver this water to another new reservoir at Crowley Lake. This water project was approaching its completion by the time the Second World War began.

The Loop's population swelled appreciably during those years, as a temporary company-town settlement was developed at the East Portal of the tunnel, about two miles from Grant Lake. Most of the supervisors, private contractors, foremen, and City specialists for the aqueduct project found lodging in June Lake. Restaurants, bars and dance halls proliferated, along with some gambling activity and a bawdy house or two. Glen Colton's "Tiger" Bar was established in 1932 and still holds one of the State of California's two longest standing alcoholic beverage licenses.

By the summer of 1940 the June Lake Fire District in conjunction with the United States Forest Service constructed the first municipal water system for the June Lake Village area. Inmate labor was utilized during this construction, and what was known as a "Spike Camp" was established to house those workers.

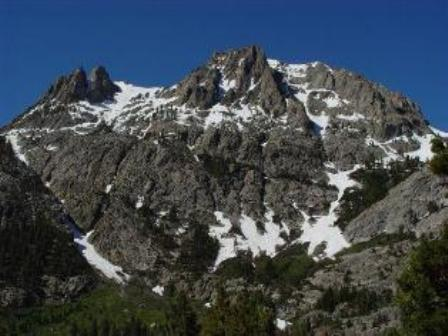
Carson Peak

It was also during this time that the sport of skiing was becoming popular in the United States, and by around 1937 there was an organized race called the "Silver Skis." Participants started near the Fish Hatchery, hiking to the top of 10,866 foot Carson Peak and skiing back down. By 1940, a group of local businessmen established the June Lake Winter Sports Association, building and operating a 2200-foot rope tow ski area with a vertical rise of 600 feet, including first aid, ski instruction and repair, light lunches, and entertainment.

The ski lift was powered by a small private hydroelectric plant on Fern Creek, as no commercial electricity was yet available. Another private generation facility was established at the Carson's Camp/Silver Lake Resort. The California Electric Power Company finally constructed local distribution lines and established power service to the Loop area in 1946. Prior to that time oil lanterns were used, and refrigeration was accomplished by sawing blocks of ice from the surface of June Lake during winter, storing them for future use in a large ice house located on shore next to the boat landings.

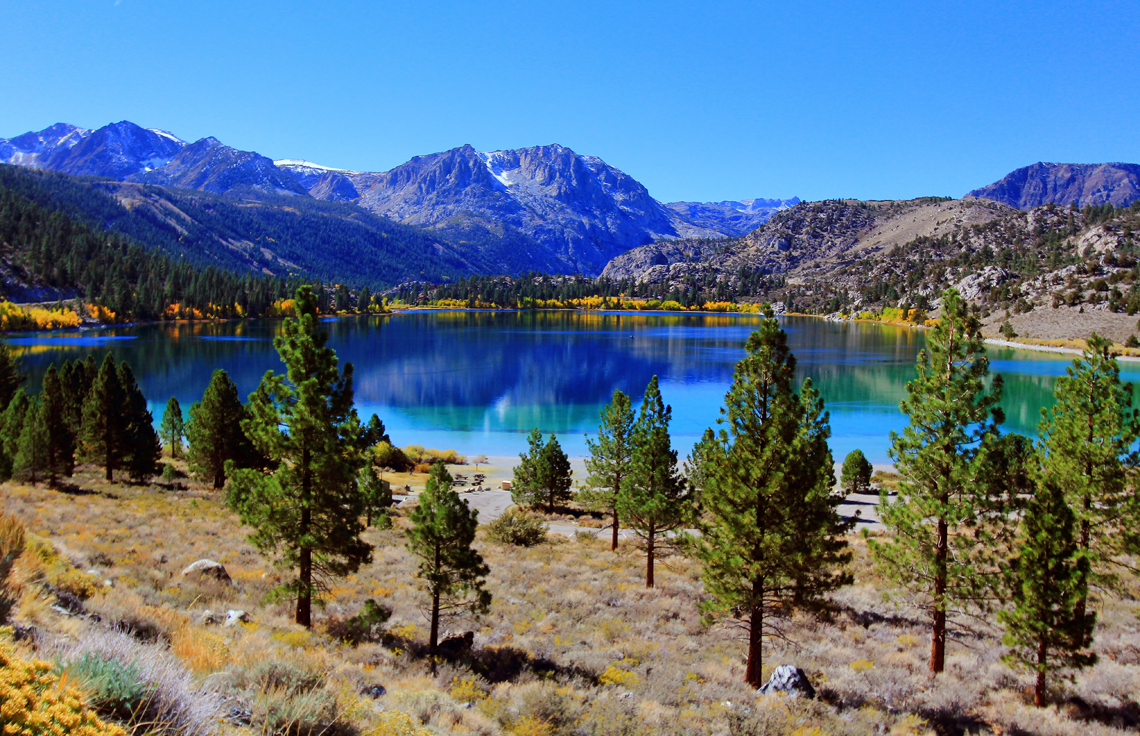
June Lake in the fall

The ski area had been unable to survive during the WWII years, but in late 1958 the Forest Service announced its intention to offer a permit for a new ski area at June Mountain. W.C. "Bud" Hayward obtained the use permit and built a full-service ski area with a double chairlift and T-Bar, which opened in February 1961. During his tenure as owner of the ski resort until 1986, Hayward expanded the terrain and facilities including the addition of a rope tow, poma lift, and three additional double chairs.

The community of June Lake retained its commercial vitality through the 1970s, with the addition of a banking branch, hardware and paint store, welder, auto body repair, art and pottery galleries, and more. Since that time however, there has been a steady economic decline marked by the growth and boom of the nearby Town of Mammoth Lakes, which drew most of the commercial activities away from its outlying communities.

== Demographics ==
Historical population
Census	Pop.	Note	%±
2010	629		—
2020	611		−2.9%
U.S. Decennial Census; 2000 2010

June Lake first appeared as a census designated place in the 2010 U.S. census.

=== 2010 ===
The 2010 United States census reported that June Lake had a population of 629. The population density was 71.6 inhabitants per square mile (27.6/km^{2}). The racial makeup of June Lake was 534 (84.9%) White, 0 (0.0%) African American, 7 (1.1%) Native American, 2 (0.3%) Asian, 0 (0.0%) Pacific Islander, 78 (12.4%) from other races, and 8 (1.3%) from two or more races. Hispanic or Latino of any race were 137 persons (21.8%).

June Lake and Carson Peak as seen from Oh! Ridge

The Census reported that 627 people (99.7% of the population) lived in households, 2 (0.3%) lived in non-institutionalized group quarters, and 0 (0%) were institutionalized.

There were 290 households, out of which 57 (19.7%) had children under the age of 18 living in them, 149 (51.4%) were married couples living together, 8 (2.8%) had a female householder with no husband present, 7 (2.4%) had a male householder with no wife present. There were 23 (7.9%) unmarried couples, and 0 (0%) homosexual partnerships. 97 households (33.4%) were made up of individuals, and 21 (7.2%) had someone living alone who was 65 years of age or older. The average household size was 2.16. There were 164 families (56.6% of all households); the average family size was 2.77.

The population was spread out, with 116 people (18.4%) under the age of 18, 38 people (6.0%) aged 18 to 24, 180 people (28.6%) aged 25 to 44, 225 people (35.8%) aged 45 to 64, and 70 people (11.1%) who were 65 years of age or older. The median age was 41.7 years. For every 100 females, there were 119.2 males. For every 100 females age 18 and over, there were 120.2 males.

There were 820 housing units at an average density of 93.4 per square mile (36.1/km^{2}), of which 157 (54.1%) were owner-occupied, and 133 (45.9%) were occupied by renters. The homeowner vacancy rate was 8.1%; the rental vacancy rate was 11.7%. 327 people (52.0% of the population) lived in owner-occupied housing units and 300 people (47.7%) lived in rental housing units.

=== 2000 ===
The 2000 United States Census reported the population of June Lake to be 613. For 2003, the California Department of Finance estimated the population to be 626. In 2000, 4% of the population was under 5 years old, 17% were from 5 to 17, 71% were from 18 to 64, and 8% were over 65. The median age was 41.4. Sixty-six percent of the households were owner occupied and 34% were rented. Only 615 of June Lake's 1,187 parcels have been developed. June Lake's population is highly seasonal: 223 households are full-time residences and 571 are part-time. Including seasonal visitors, June Lake may have a temporary population of 2,900.

The Mono County General Plan provides for an additional 3,970 dwelling units in June Lake.

== Community ==
June Lake's chief industry is tourism, with lodging and vacation rentals ranging from cottages and cabins to motels and full-service resorts. There are also public Campgrounds on the lands of the Inyo National Forest at Oh! Ridge, June Lake, Gull Lake, Reversed Creek, and Silver Lake.

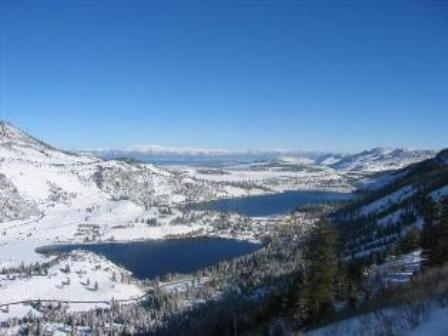
June Lake and Gull Lake looking east from June Mountain

From December through April, the June Mountain Ski Area is the center of activity for June Lake. In addition to its 500+ acres of ride able terrain for all abilities and types of skiers and snowboarders, the ski resort features a commanding view of the lakes below and the entire Mono Basin. There are also equipment rentals and a winter sports school.

Local jobs are generally service or retail related, although there are some contractors including builders, electricians and plumbers. Many residents commute to work in Lee Vining, Mammoth Lakes, or even further to Bridgeport or Bishop. Over fifty percent of all private residences in June Lake, however, are second homes. Most of these part-time occupants are here during summer months, leaving their June Lake homes dark for the winter. Historically, June Lake's summer residents have comprised a vital and active part of community life.

During winter, the majority of the workforce for the June Mountain Ski Resort is housed at employee housing facilities in Mammoth and provided with daily bus transportation by their employer.

== Tourism and activities ==
Because the community is built on hills and meadows in this subalpine valley surrounded by high mountain peaks, it has been dubbed the "Switzerland of California." The area is notable for its trout fishing. Hiking is a favorite pastime of the area: June Lake offers many trails that lead into the nearby back country of the Ansel Adams Wilderness Area. Most of the hikes, including Fern Lake, Reversed Peak, and Agnew Lake are strenuous and vertical, with the exception of the Parker Lake Trail which is a 2-mile hike that only climbs 400 feet in elevation. The Frontier Pack Train at Silver Lake offers equestrian day rides, as well as backcountry trips. In Autumn, an abundance of aspen groves change from green to gold and red hues as winter approaches.

== Education ==
June Lake is in the Eastern Sierra Unified School District. The local June Lake Elementary School was abandoned and torn down in the 1970s, and school bus transportation is provided to Lee Vining. Children attend Lee Vining Elementary School. High School students may attend Lee Vining High School, or alternatively, the Eastern Sierra Academy, if they qualify. Some parents seek inter-district transfers to the Mammoth Unified School District. June Lake has a public library.

== Fire Protection District ==
June Lake is the seat of the June Lake Fire Protection District, which was established in 1939. The fire protection district covers an area of approximately 8.5 square miles (22 km^{2}), including not only June Lake but also the nearby unincorporated areas of Pine Cliff, June Lake Junction, and the down canyon area of the June Lake Loop from the June Lake Village to Silver Lake. The District maintains two fire houses.

== Public Utility District ==
June Lake is also the seat of the June Lake Public Utility District, which was established in 1947. The June Lake Public Utility District provides water and sewer service to an area of 1,720 acres (7.0 km^{2}) within the June Lake Loop. The water supply is based on diversion rights, split between the Village and Down Canyon areas of June Lake, totaling approximately 1,116,000 U.S. gallons (4,220,000 L) per day. Distribution is effected by 47,000 feet (14,000 m) of pipes.
