= Zab Emirate =

14th century emirate

The Zab Emirate (Arabic: امارة الزاب) was an emirate that ruled Biskra and the surrounding oases in the Zab region under the Banu Muzni family from mid 14th century to 1402 in the highlands and desert fringes of eastern Algeria.
