= Silver Lake (Mono County, California) =

Lake in the state of California, United States

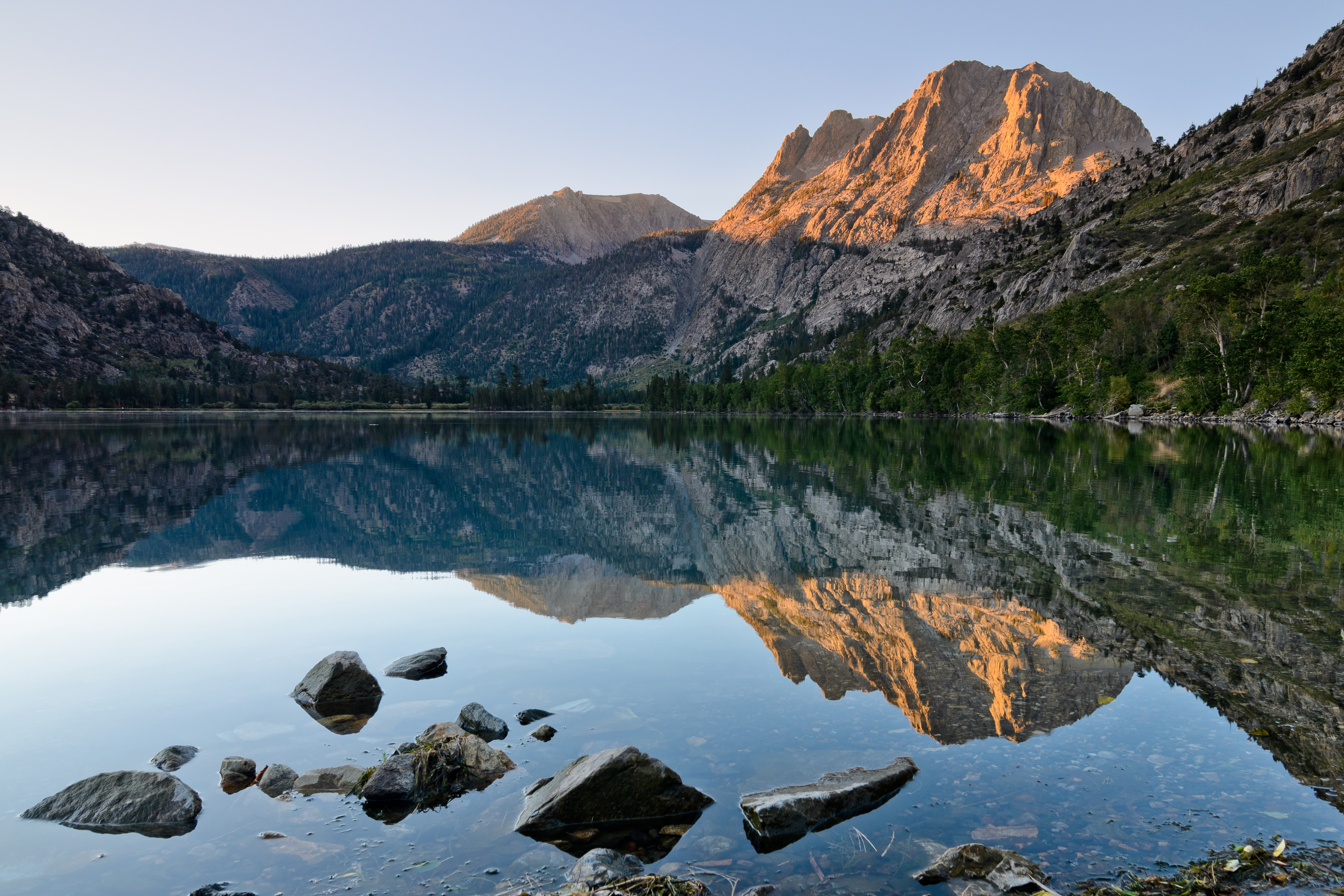
- Silver Lake in September 2016

- Location within California Location within the United States
- Location: Mono County, California
- Coordinates: 37°46′37″N 119°07′30″W
- Type: Lake
- Surface elevation: 7,228 feet (2,203 m)

Silver Lake is a lake within the Inyo National Forest in Mono County, California, in the United States. Silver Lake Campground, a public U.S. Forest Service campground is located on the bank of Silver Lake. Silver Lake Resort also is close to the lake and provides simple facilities for travelers in the area. The lake is fed by Rush Creek.

== See also ==
- List of lakes in California
