= William Rounseville Alger =

American clergyman and author

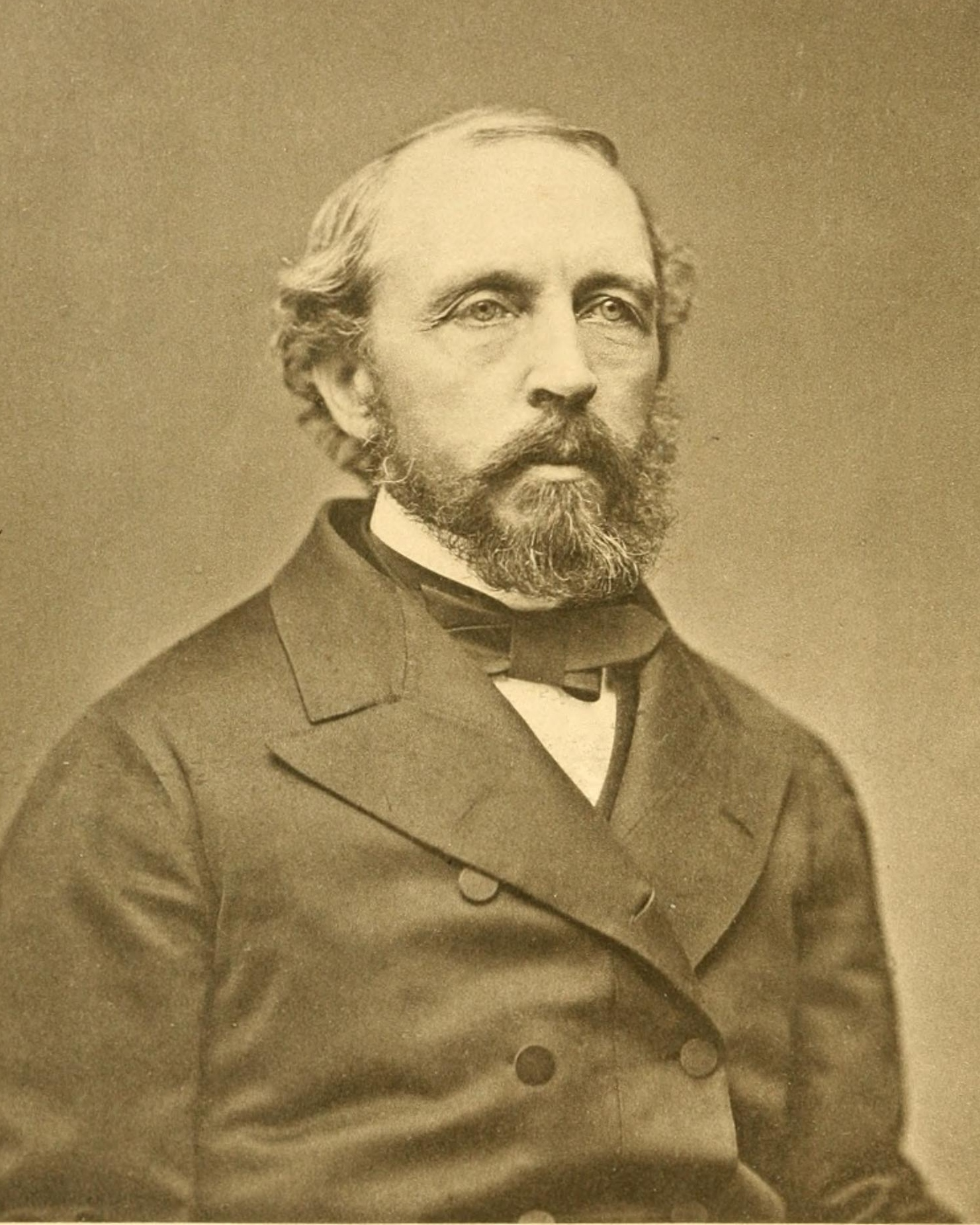
- Alger in 1876
- Born: December 28, 1822; Freetown, Massachusetts, US
- Died: February 7, 1905 (aged 82); Boston, Massachusetts, US
- Occupations: Minister and author
- Children: 7, incl. Philip and Abby
- Relatives: Horatio Alger (cousin)

William Rounseville Alger (December 28, 1822 – February 7, 1905) was an American Unitarian minister, author, poet, hymnist, editor, and abolitionist. He also served as Chaplain of the Massachusetts House of Representatives.

== Early life and education ==
William Rounseville Alger was born in Freetown, Massachusetts, on December 28, 1822 to Nahum and Catherine Sampson Alger, née Rounseville. He attended the academy at Pembroke, New Hampshire, working part-time at a cotton mill. Alger graduated from the Harvard Divinity School in 1847 and was ordained as a Unitarian minister in Roxbury, Massachusetts, where he preached until 1855.

== Career ==
After 1855, Alger went to the Bulfinch Street Church in Boston, and preached around the country including in New York, Colorado, Illinois, Maine, Louisiana, and Rhode Island. He became well known in Boston for filling Tremont Temple.

Alger was an active abolitionist and Free Mason, and a contributor to various periodicals including the Christian Examiner, which he co-edited in the 1860s. In 1857, he gave the annual Boston Fourth of July celebration day speech, in which he addressed the issue of slavery. His remarks—which denounced the Fugitive Slave law and the Boston authorities who observed it—were controversial; and the city refused the usual publication of the speech. However, seven years later, the city government unanimously reversed their decision, publishing the speech and publicly thanking him for it.

Alger was also the first regular pastor of the first Episcopalian church in Biddeford, Maine, which was built in 1869, as well as the All Souls Unitarian Church in Roxbury (also called the Mount Pleasant Congregational Church). He also served in The Church of the Messiah, an important Unitarian church in New York. He served as Chaplain of the Massachusetts House of Representatives. Harvey Jewell, the speaker of the Massachusetts House of Representatives was impressed by Alger's prayers and asked for his words to be taken down by the stenographer and published.

== Death and legacy ==
Alger died on February 7, 1905.

Some of his notebooks are stored at the Harvard Divinity School library, and the New York Public Library. Many of his published works have gone through numerous editions, and a number of his hymns have been published in various hymnals and songbooks.

== Family ==
William Alger married Anne Langdon in 1847. They had seven children, including Philip Rounseville Alger, an American naval officer, and translator Abby Langdon Alger.

Alger's cousin was the noted author Horatio Alger, who had also served as a Unitarian pastor for a short time. Though he was less widely known than Horatio, Gary Scharnhorst called William the "more talented" cousin in his 1990 biography of William Alger.

== Selected works ==
- History of the cross of Christ (1851)
- The charities of Boston, or, Twenty years at the Warren-street Chapel (1856)
- The Genius and Posture of America: An Oration Delivered to the Citizens of Boston, July 4, 1857 (originally given July 4, 1857, pub. 1864)
- The historic purchase of freedom (1859)
- Lessons for mankind, from the life and death of Humbolt (1859)
- A tribute to the memory and services of the Rev. Theodore Parker (1860)
- Good Samaritan in Boston; a tribute to Moses Grant (1862)
- Public morals: or, The true glory of a state (1862)
- The solitudes of nature and of man; or, The loneliness of human life (1867)
- Prayers offered in the Massachusetts House of Representatives during the session of 1868 (1868)
- The American poets : a review of the works of Thomas William Parsons (1869)
- The end of the world, and the day of judgment : two discourses preached to the Music-Hall Society (1870)
- The sword, the pen, and the pulpit; with a tribute to the Christian genius and memory of Charles Dickens (1870)
- The Poetry of the Orient (1874) [first pub. under The Poetry of the East; 1856]
- Life of Edwin Forrest, the American tragedian (1877)
- The Friendships of Women (1879)
- A Critical History of the Doctrine of a Future Life (1880)
- The school of life (1881)
