= Peter Alger =

New Zealand potter (born 1952)

- Born: Peter Alger; 1952 (age 72–73); New Brunswick, Canada
- Known for: Potter

Peter Alger (born 1952) is a New Zealand potter.

== Early life ==
He was born in New Brunswick, Canada, in 1952 and emigrated to New Zealand with his family in 1959.

== Career ==
In 1968, he became apprenticed to potter Warren Tippet in the Coromandel. He established his own pottery studio in Northland in 1970.

His identifying potter's mark, as registered with the New Zealand Society of Potters, was from 1969 to 1975 the shape of a clover, and from 1975 onwards a stylized fish image.

== Recognition ==
In 1992, he won the Norsewear Art Award with his stoneware work Elemental Bowl and was listed as a Finalist in the New Zealand Society of Potters Easter Show Award Exhibition. In 1992, he was also awarded a Certificate of Merit at the Cleveland Ceramics Awards. In 1993, the Northland Craft Trust and the QEII Arts Council granted him a one-year artist residency at The Quarry in Whangarei. In 1994, he won the Glenfalloch Award at the Cleveland Ceramics Awards.

== Collections ==
Alger's work is held in the collections of the Auckland War Memorial Museum and the Suter Gallery in Nelson.
