= Ian Alger =

Psychotherapist

Ian Ewart Alger (June 20, 1926, Oshawa, Ontario – February 21, 2009, New York City) was an innovative psychotherapist who was an early adopter of using videotape as a tool in therapy.
