= Rush Creek (Mono County, California) =

Rush Creek Lake Creek
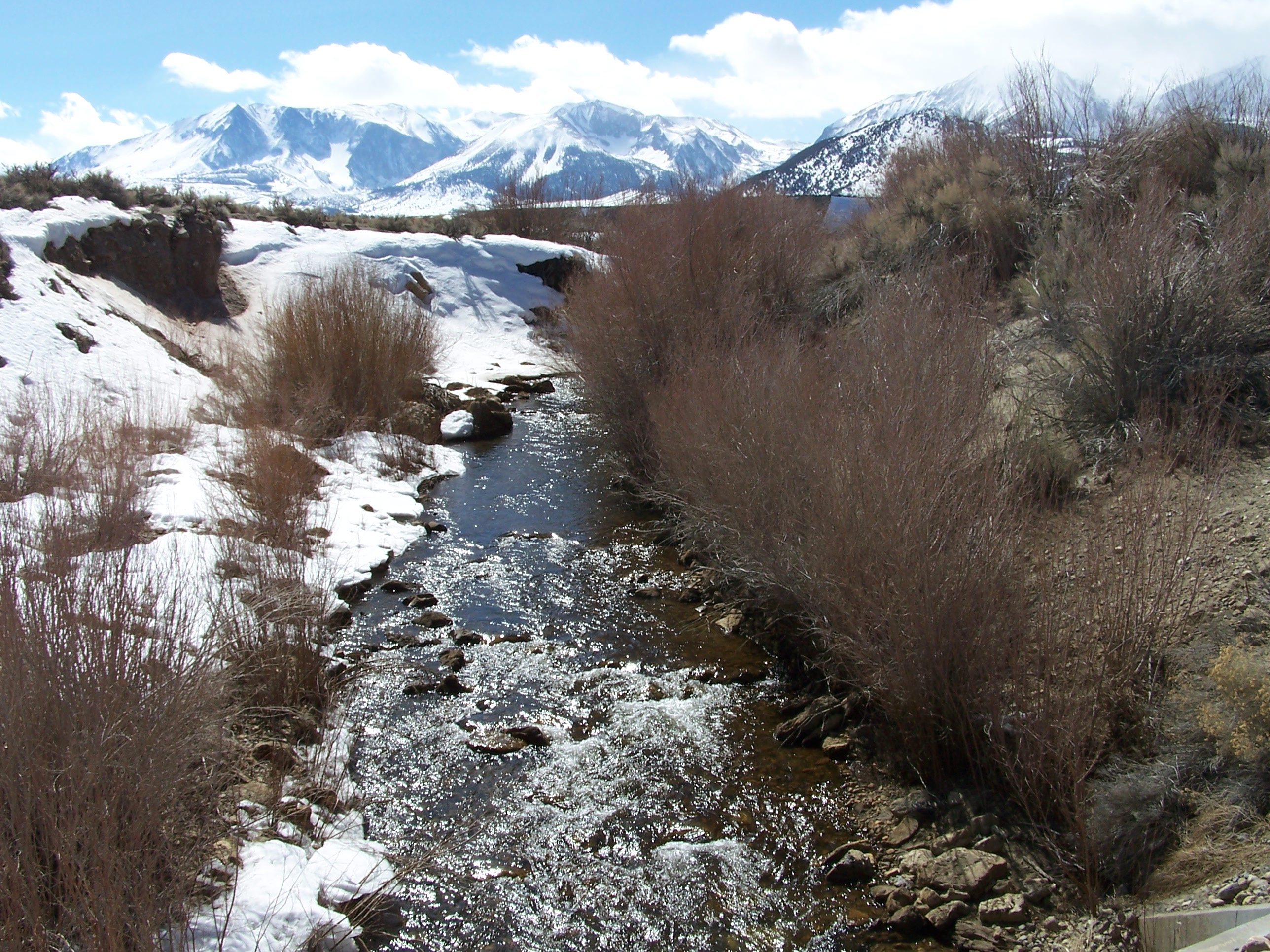
- Deep channel incision on Rush Creek due to lowering of Mono Lake. Photo by Greg Reis, courtesy of the Mono Lake Committee

Location
- Country: United States
- State: California
- Region: Mono County

Physical characteristics
- Source: Mount Lyell
  - location: Madera County, Sierra Nevada, California
  - coordinates: 37°44′22″N 119°16′18″W
  - elevation: 12,300 ft (3,700 m)
- Mouth: Mono Lake
  - coordinates: 37°57′17″N 119°03′09″W
  - elevation: 6,378 ft (1,944 m)
- Length: 27.2 mi (43.8 km)
- Basin size: 131 mi^{2} (340 km^{2})
- Discharge
  - location: above Grant Lake
  - average: 90 cu ft/s (2.5 m^{3}/s)
  - minimum: 16.6 cu ft/s (0.47 m^{3}/s)
  - maximum: 1,070 cu ft/s (30 m^{3}/s)

Basin features
- Tributaries
  - left: Alger Creek, Parker Creek, Walker Creek
  - right: Reversed Creek

Rush Creek is a 27.2-mile-long (43.8 km) creek in California on the eastern slope of the Sierra Nevada, running east and then northeast to Mono Lake. Rush Creek is the largest stream in the Mono Basin, carrying 41% of the total runoff. It was extensively diverted by the Los Angeles Aqueduct system in the twentieth century until California Trout, the National Audubon Society, and the Mono Lake Committee sued Los Angeles Department of Water and Power (LADWP) for continuous low flows in Rush Creek to maintain trout populations in good condition, which was ordered by the court in 1985.

== History ==
On A. W. Schmidt's plat of 1857 it was called Lake Creek, possibly because it was the major stream flowing into Mono Lake. The Rush Creek place name appeared on the Hoffmann and Gardiner map of 1863-1867 and is one of the older place names on the eastern slope of the Sierra, although the origin of the Rush Creek name is unknown. Between 1916 and 1925, three dams were constructed to enlarge natural lakes and flood meadows for hydropower, enlarging Waugh Lake, Gem Lake, and Agnew Lake. Grant Lake was previously enlarged by an irrigation dam, and by 1941 the current dam was enlarged and diversions of water from Grant Lake into the Los Angeles aqueduct began.

== Watershed ==
The source of Rush Creek lies high on Mount Lyell, and its upper forks descend from Marie Lakes and from Davis Lakes on Mount Davis, then combine to flow through Waugh Lake, Gem Lake, Agnew Lake, Silver Lake, and Grant Lake on its way to Mono Lake. After Rush Creek passes through Grant Lake, Parker and Walker Creeks enter it just above the Narrows. The Narrows is a point where steep cliffs rise up from both sides of the stream, and the Rush Creek Bottomlands extend from the Narrows to Mono Lake.

== Ecology ==
Before 1941, dense riparian vegetation in the Rush Creek Bottomlands supported abundant waterfowl and other wildlife such as mallard, teal, geese, deer, bears, mountain lions, bobcats, and coyotes, while at the mouth of Rush Creek there were large riparian trees, especially aspen and cottonwood. The Bottomlands historically contained a broad riparian forest, a sinuous main channel and in some places multiple channels, excellent quality spawning gravel, exposed willow roots, some fallen trees, and shoreline debris jams, which provided wildlife habitat and fish habitat. After diversions by the Los Angeles Aqueduct, lowering of the water table led to a 50% loss of pre-diversion woody riparian vegetation, and a 70% loss of pre-diversion meadowlands. Near its mouth, Rush Creek incised 30 feet below its former floodplain to meet the lowered lake level in Mono Lake, and the new floodplain is considerably narrower. Most of the distributary channels parallel to the main channel are dry and blocked with debris. Instream fish habitat is considerably poorer, due to a lack of pools, spawning gravels, and woody debris. There are now 48 species of birds, mammals, and reptiles that use Rush Creek habitats.

There are no fish native to the Mono Basin, but shortly after 1850 Lahontan Cutthroat Trout were introduced to the streams, and an abundant fishery flourished by 1900. Above Grant, Lake Golden Trout were planted in the 1920s and 1930s, and at some point threespine stickleback were introduced into the system along with steelhead trout from the Ventura River. An egg collecting station was constructed on Lower Rush Creek in 1925 and operated through 1953, during which time most eggs were probably shipped to the Mt. Whitney Hatchery. The Fern Creek Hatchery between Silver Lake and Grant Lake produced approximately 1 million fish per year from 1928 to 1942. Brown, Rainbow, and Brook Trout were stocked from Fern Creek and Mt. Whitney State Fish Hatcheries in the Early 1900s. Brown Trout were introduced in 1919, were well established by 1931, dominated the fishery by 1940, and were stocked until 1942. 3/4 lb. to 2 lb. brown trout were common, and occasionally a 5-6 lb. fish was caught. During the Great Depression trout from Rush Creek regularly supplemented the diets of local residents.

== Conservation ==
In order to restore Rush Creek's previous rich habitats, various stream restoration techniques are being implemented. These include rewatering dry distributary channels, managing flows from Grant Lake to mimic natural flows, and planting vegetation in certain areas. These activities, if effective, should restore the stream to a dynamic and functioning ecosystem resembling pre-1941 conditions. A 1991 grazing moratorium also allowed modest recovery of riparian vegetation to occur.

== See also ==
- Lee Vining Creek
- List of rivers in California
- Mill Creek
- Mono Lake
