= Paul Alger =

German footballer (1943–2025)

Personal information
- Date of birth: 13 August 1943
- Place of birth: Bonn, Gau Cologne-Aachen, Germany
- Date of death: 14 June 2025 (aged 81)
- Position: Forward

Senior career*
Years	Team	Apps	(Gls)
1965–1966	Bonner SC		
1966–1968	1. FC Köln		
1968–1970	Viktoria Köln	53	(8)
- * Club domestic league appearances and goals

Paul Alger (13 August 1943 – 14 June 2025) was a German footballer who played as a forward. Between 1966 and 1968, Alger played for 1. FC Köln. In 1968, he helped Köln to a victory of the DFB-Pokal after being substituted in the 46th minute. Alger died on 14 June 2025, at the age of 81.

== Honours ==
1. FC Köln

- DFB-Pokal: 1967–68
