= Alger Lakes =

Lake in the state of California, United States

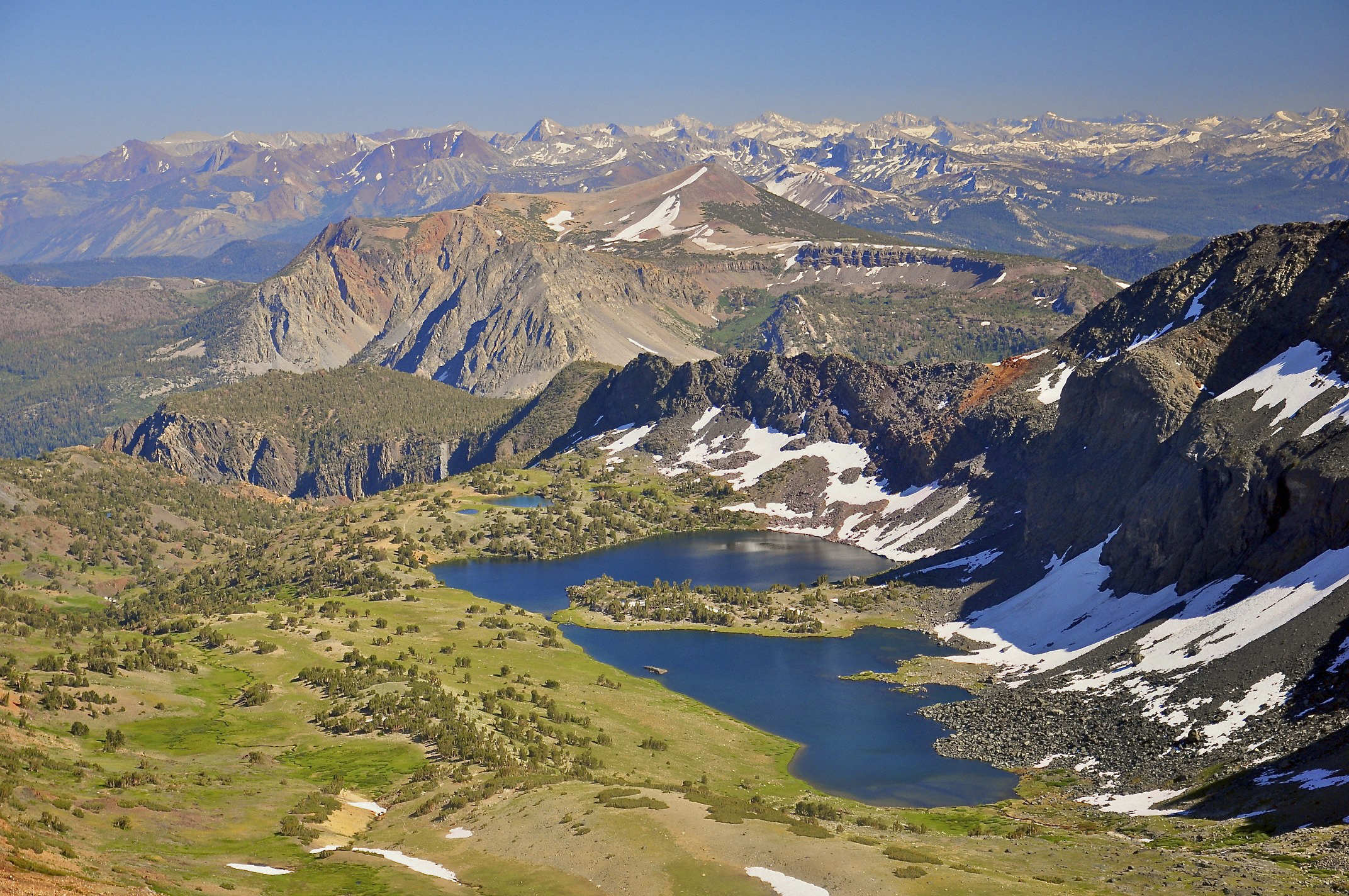
- Interactive map of Alger Lakes
- Location: Mono County, California, United States
- Coordinates: 37°42′N 118°51′W
- Type: Group of lakes
- Basin countries: United States

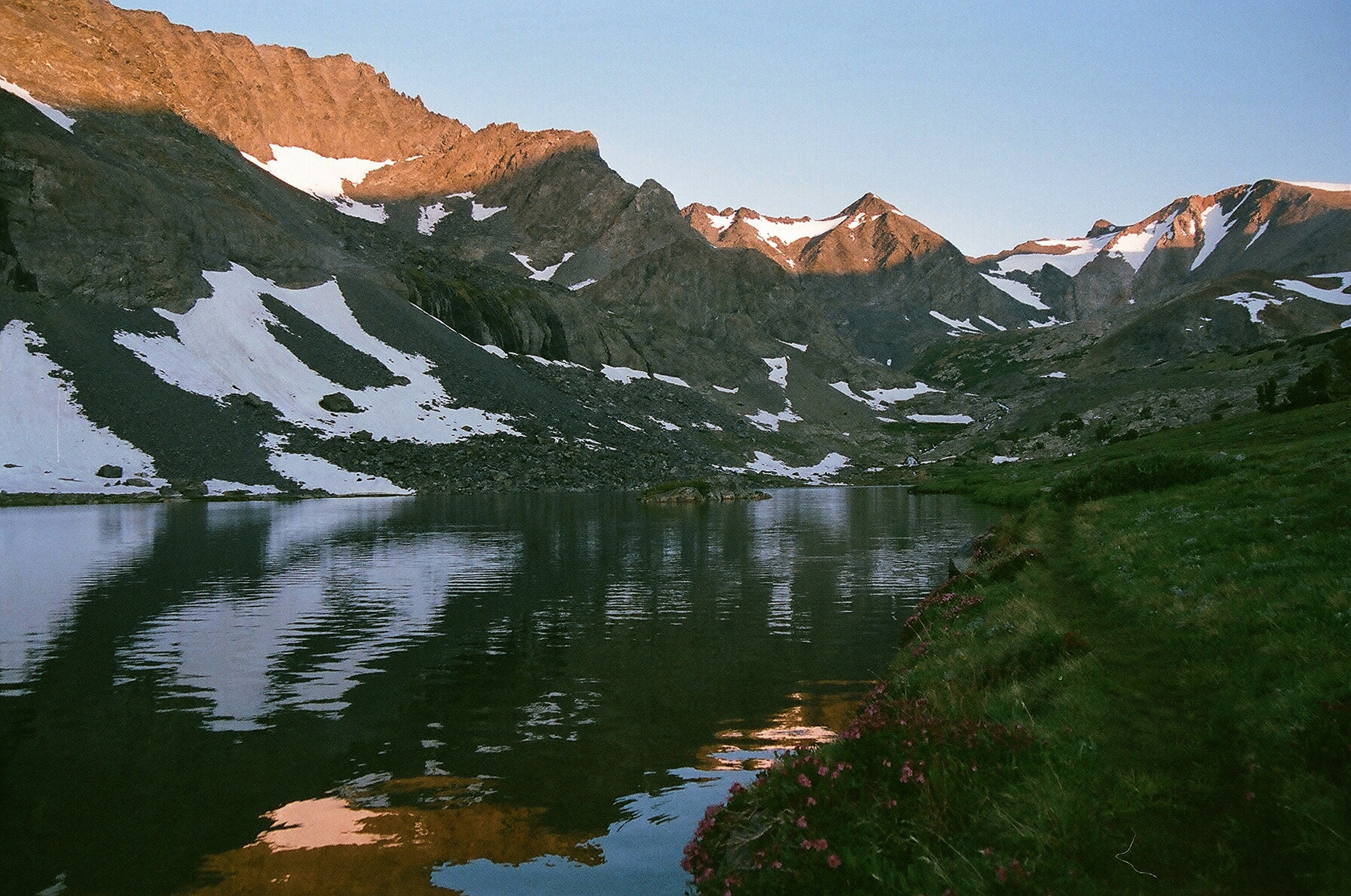
Upper Alger lake in 2017

The Alger Lakes are a group of lakes in Mono County, California, in the United States. The Alger Lakes were named for John Alger of the United States Geological Survey.

== See also ==
- List of lakes in California
