= June Mountain ski area =

Ski area in California, United States

June Mountain
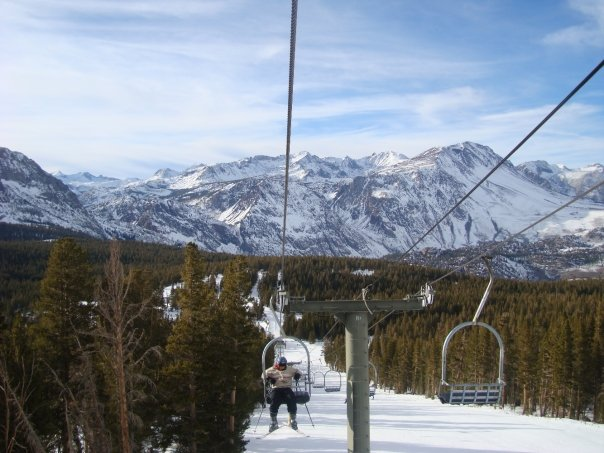

- Location in California June Mountain (the United States)
- Location: June Mountain; Inyo National Forest
- Nearest city: June Lake, California
- Coordinates: 37.7683°N 119.0906°W
- Status: Operating
- Owner: Alterra Mountain Company
- Vertical: 2,545 ft (776 m)
- Top elevation: 10,090 ft (3,080 m)
- Base elevation: 7,545 ft (2,300 m)
- Skiable area: 1,500 acres (610 ha)
- Trails: 41 total 15% beginner 40% intermediate 45% advanced
- Longest run: 2 mi (3.2 km)
- Lift system: 7: (2 high speed quads, 4 Doubles, 1 carpet lift)
- Lift capacity: 10,000 passengers/hr
- Terrain parks: Mambo; Upper Sunrise Jib; Sunrise; Super Pipe
- Snowfall: 250 in (640 cm)
- Snowmaking: Yes
- Night skiing: No
- Website: www.JuneMountain.com

June Mountain ski area is a winter resort in the eastern Sierra Nevada of California, located near June Lake, southeast of Yosemite National Park.

== Mountains ==
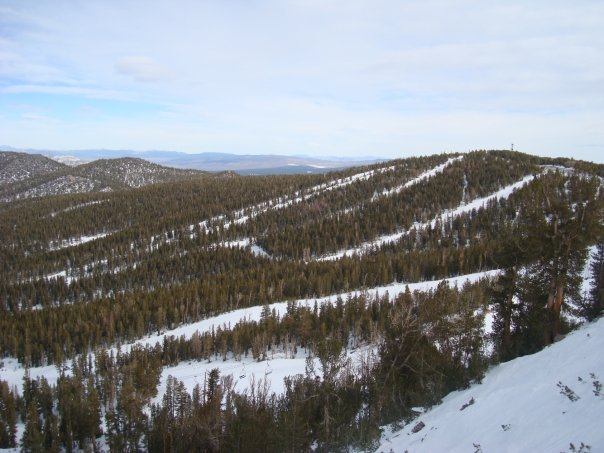
View of the ski slopes at June

June Mountain ski area consists of two mountains, Rainbow Mountain, with an elevation of 10,044 feet (3,062 m), and June Mountain, with a peak of 10,095 feet (3,080 m). The total vertical rise from the lower ticket office to the summit of June Mountain is 2,545 feet. June Mountain averages 250 inches of snowfall a year. The ski area covers 1,500 acres with 7 ski lifts.

Many opportunities exist, however, for riders to explore the trees that cover much of the ski areas total acreage and access fresh snow off piste. June Mountain has also established itself as a favorite spot among locals due to its small crowds and easy access to powder following a storm.

== History ==
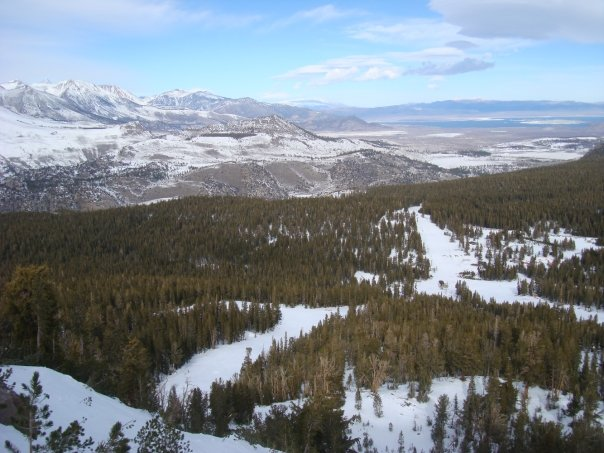
Looking down upon June from the top

June Mountain hosted the 2006 Ski Mountaineering Race Series and the ski and snowboard portions of the 2006 California Winter Games in March 2006.

On June 21, 2012, Mammoth Mountain and the Starwood Capital Group announced that they would close June Mountain for the summer and winter 2012–2013 season, after 50 years of continuous operation. An active citizen movement arose in response, raising concerns about the prospects for sustaining the local community if the mountain closed. With a new strategy to finally invest in snowmaking, a chairlift, and marketing, June Mountain re-opened for the 2013–2014 season. In 2017, Mammoth Resorts announced its sale by Starwood to a partnership of Aspen Skiing Company and KSL Capital Partners, later named Alterra Mountain Company.
