= Philip Rounseville Alger =

American naval officer (1859–1912)

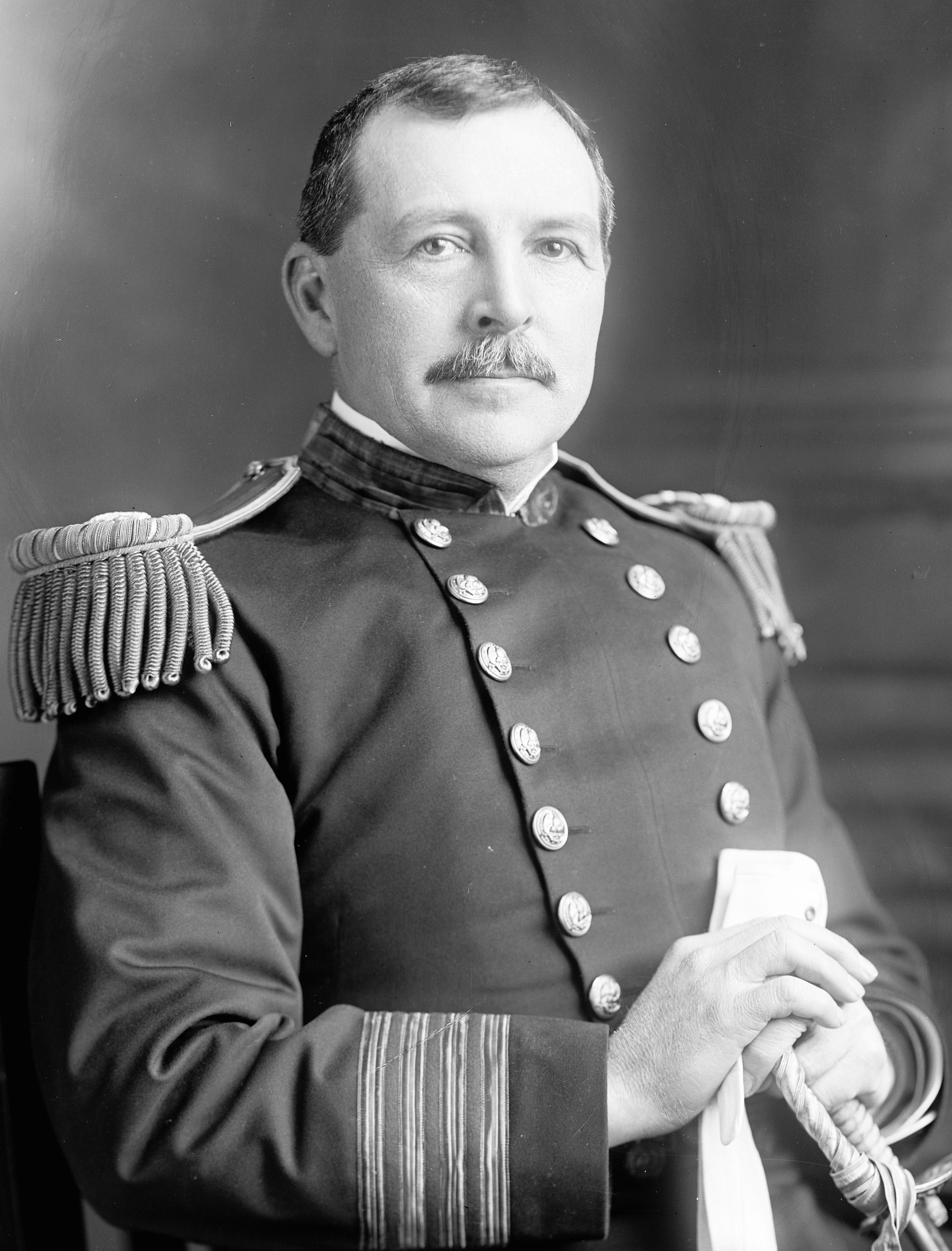
- Born: September 29, 1859; Boston, Massachusetts, US
- Died: February 23, 1912 (aged 52); Annapolis, Maryland, US
- Occupation: Naval officer

Philip Rounseville Alger (September 29, 1859 – February 23, 1912) was an American Naval officer.

== Biography ==
Philip Rounseville Alger was born in Boston, Massachusetts. His father was the noted Unitarian minister William Rounseville Alger.

He entered the U.S. Naval Academy in 1876 and graduated four years later at the head of his class. His first cruise, in Richmond, Virginia, took him to the Pacific station and to China. In 1882, Alger was ordered to the Bureau of Ordnance, Washington, D.C. This assignment exposed him for the first time to the field in which he was to later win marked distinction. Following duty in European waters on board USS Pensacola from 1885 to 1889, Alger returned to the Bureau of Ordnance. On November 10, 1890, he resigned his commission as a line officer ensign to accept an appointment as a professor of mathematics with an equivalent rank of lieutenant. One year later, he was named head of the department of mechanics at the Naval Academy. In ensuing years, Alger was closely involved in the advances made in naval ordnance which were made as the United States established its "New Navy".

In 1903, Alger accepted the position of secretary and treasurer of the United States Naval Institute, an office that entailed the editing of the institute's Proceedings. The following year, Alger was appointed to a special board to advise the Bureau of Ordnance in developing and test ordnance material.

Alger's extensive writing on ordnance included two books, Exterior Ballistics (1904) and The Elastic Strength of Guns (1906), which came to be regarded as standards in their fields. His work entitled Hydromechanics (1902) was used as a textbook at the Naval Academy and other institutions of higher learning. Alger also penned numerous articles on a wide range of technical subjects. Alger died at Annapolis, Maryland, on February 23, 1912.
