= National Audubon Society v. Superior Court =

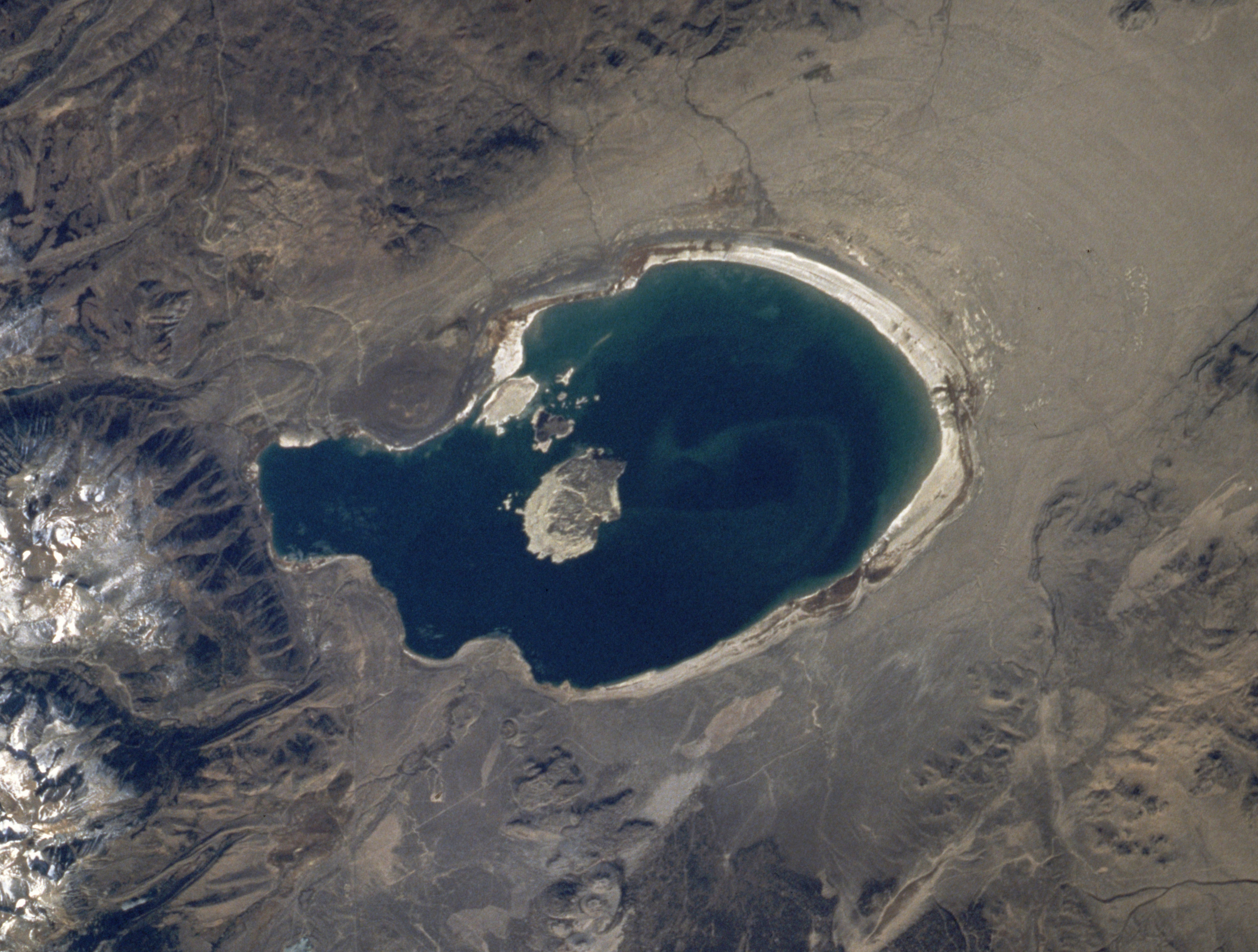
Image of Mono Lake from space, 1985

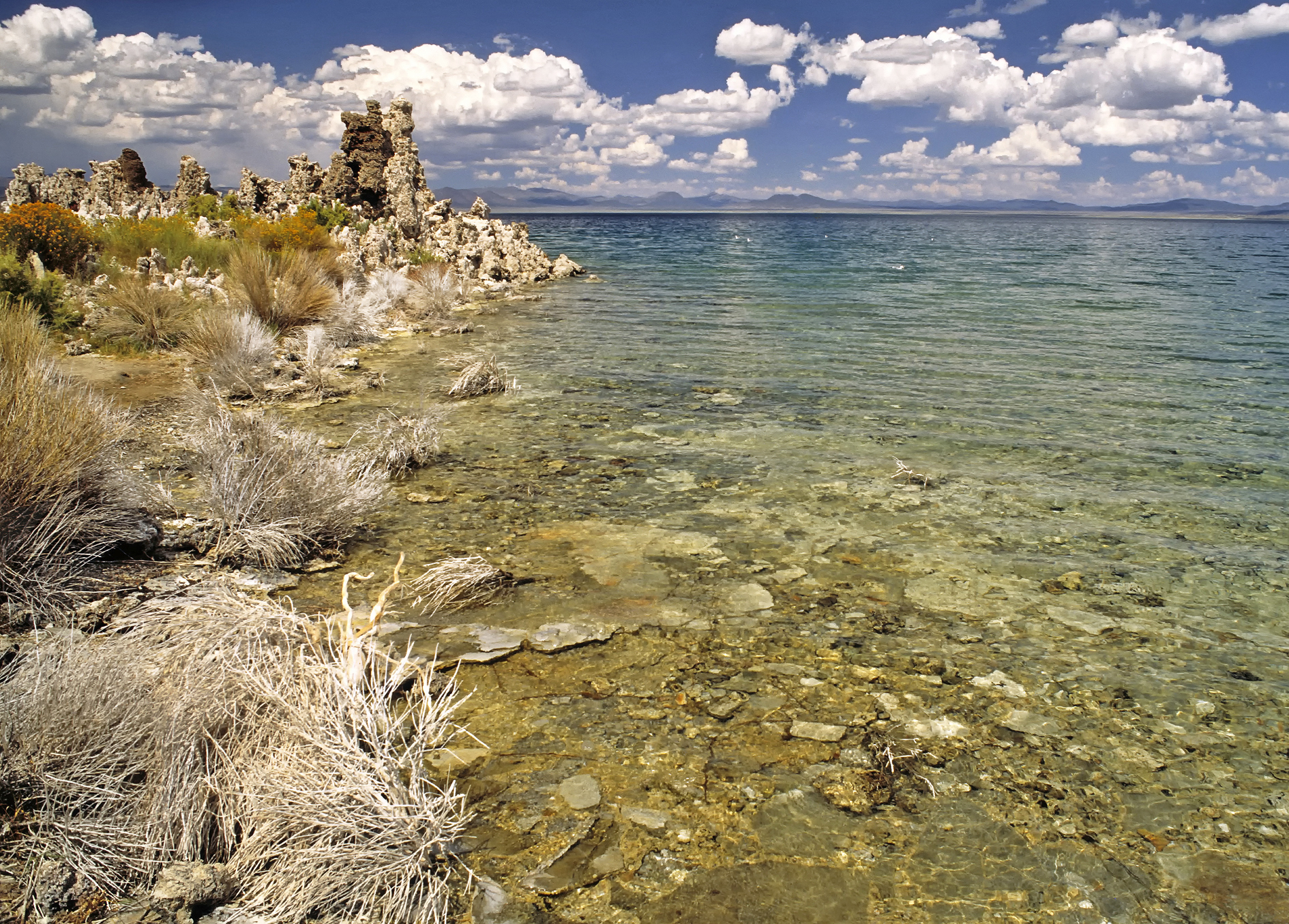
Lakeside of Mono Lake, 1999

National Audubon Society v. Superior Court, 33 Cal. 3d 419, is a California Supreme Court decision holding that the public trust doctrine limits appropriative water rights and requires the state to consider and protect public trust uses when allocating water. The public trust doctrine (lowercase per MOS:CAPS) holds that certain resources—traditionally navigable waters and their beds—are held by the state in trust for public uses such as navigation, commerce, fishing, and, under California law, ecological and recreational values. The court concluded that previously granted appropriative rights are subject to continuing state supervision and adjustment to avoid or minimize harm to public trust interests where feasible.

The plaintiffs alleged that the public trust doctrine was being violated due to environmental damages to Mono Lake in the form of significant water level declines as a result of water diversions by the City of Los Angeles Department of Water and Power (DWP). DWP based their defense on the fact that they held permits, issued by the state for the diversions, and so the diversions were allowable.

The central issue in the case was whether appropriative water rights (granted in the past) must consider the public trust doctrine, requiring protection of natural resources by the state. More specifically, the issue being addressed by the court was whether Mono Lake was subject to a public trust, which would invalidate Los Angeles' use of the streams feeding the lake.

The California Supreme Court held that the state, under the public trust doctrine, had continuing responsibility for the state's navigable waters and that the public trust doctrine, therefore, prevented any party from appropriating water in a manner that harmed the public trust interests. However, the court also recognized that LA depended on these diversions as a critical water source, and this in turn mitigated the rule of law as the court held that water transfers were permissible even though some damage to the environment would occur as long as this was kept to minimal harm to the extent feasible. The court described the public trust and the appropriative system as “part of an integrated system of water law” and required decisionmakers to revisit and, if necessary, modify allocations that impair trust uses.

== Case summary ==
In 1979, the National Audubon Society, Mono Lake Committee, and others sued the City of Los Angeles Department of Water and Power (DWP), alleging that diversions from four Mono Lake tributaries lowered lake levels and harmed public trust resources. The public trust doctrine is the cornerstone of this court case. The doctrine originates from Roman law and has persisted throughout European and English Common law. The Institutes of Justinian from the Sixth Century A.D. stated: by the law of nature these things are common to mankind -the air, running water, the sea and consequently the shores of the sea. Some scholars trace California public trust principles to Spanish/Mexican legal traditions; however, the California doctrine principally derives from U.S. common law authorities.

Plaintiffs argued that the public trust doctrine required the state to consider and protect Mono Lake’s recreational and ecological values when allocating water. The public trust doctrine holds that water, fish, and wildlife are shared resources to be held in an exalted position, above that of any industrial, commercial, or private uses in any administrative or judicial review of water allocation, and establishes that the government must uphold and protect this trusteeship as a moral obligation.

Audubon's original complaint, filed with the Superior Court of Mono County, asserted the diversions were a violation of the public trust doctrine, were both a public and private nuisance, and a violation of California State Constitution Article X, Section 4 & Article XVI, Section 6, which respectively prohibit obstruction of navigable waters and gifts by the state of a state asset. The suit attempted to establish Public Trust rights in Mono Basin, and sought declaratory and injunctive relief. The Supreme Court of California held that the state has a continuing duty to supervise and, where feasible, prevent harm to public trust resources, and that appropriative rights are subject to that duty.

== Background ==
The basis for the public trust doctrine goes back to Roman law. Under Roman law, the air, the rivers, the sea and the seashore were incapable of private ownership; they were dedicated to the use of the public. In essence, the public trust doctrine establishes the role of the state as having trustee environmental duties owed to the public that are subsequently enforceable by the public. There is judicial recognition of this, dictating that certain rights of the public are key to individual common law rights (such as state recognition of the public right or trust for waterways and coastal zones). Judicial recognition of the public trust doctrine has been established for tidelands and non-navigable waterways, submerged land (such as lake beds) and the waters above them, and preservation of a public interest (such as recreation, swimming, access, and sport fishing).

The leading case that established the public trust doctrine in the U.S. is the 1892 Supreme Court case Illinois Central Railroad v. Illinois. The Court held that public trust submerged lands belong to the respective States within which they are found, with the consequent right to use or dispose of any portion thereof, when that can be done without substantial impairment of the interest of the public in the waters…. setting a precedent for strict scrutiny of any private taking of public trust land. The Court in Illinois voided the deed because under public trust law it did not promote a primary public purpose. This meaning has been supported by Federal and California Court decisions in Woodruff v. North Bloomfield, People v. Gold Run Ditch Mining Co., People ex rel Ricks Water Co. v. Elk River Mill and Lumber Co and People v. Truckee Lumber Co. These cases make it clear as a matter of law one must exercise rights or use property so as not to infringe on the rights, interests or properties of others.

== Procedural history ==
1928: California State Constitution Article X, Section 2 states that all waters of the state must be put to reasonable and beneficial use. Any waters in excess of the "reasonable and beneficial uses" are considered surplus waters available for use by others, as stipulated under the appropriative water rights administered by California State Water Resources Control Board (SWRCB) Water rights are granted by the SWRBC after an application to appropriate water is approved and a permit is issued. The permit allows construction of a project needed to divert the water according to the terms and conditions of the permit, which includes submission of periodic progress reports by the applicant with SWRCB to ensure the application of the water is for beneficial use. If the conditional terms of the permit are met, SWRCB may issue a license to confirm the appropriative rights to the water.

1940: the City of Los Angeles Department of Water and Power (DWP) was granted permits allowing appropriation for the entire flows of four out of five of Mono Lake's tributaries (Lee Vining, Walker, Parker, and Rush Creeks) for municipal use and hydropower generation. Mono Lake's tributaries contain glacial fed snowmelt from the Sierra Nevada and thus convey potable water, whereas the water in Mono Lake itself was and is not potable due to its salinity. Despite being granted permits, DWP lacked the appropriate conveyance facilities to physically appropriate and transport the volume of water that was granted at the time.

1963: The City of Los Angeles authorized the construction of a new aqueduct, the Second Los Angeles Aqueduct to transport surface water from Mono Basin and both surface and groundwater from Owens Basin.

1974: SWRCB issued licenses confirming DWP's right to divert water from Mono Lake tributaries, resulting in annual diversions of approximately 83,000 acre-feet (102,000,000 m^{3}) of water from Mono Basin since the aqueduct was completed in 1970. The diversions from the second aqueduct caused the surface area of the lake to decrease by one-third and the lake level to drop 43 feet (13 m), exposing 18,000 acres (73 km^{2}) of lakebed.

1977: Stanford biologist David Gaines published a study on Mono Lake's ecosystem highlighting the dangers of water diversion that garnered national attention to the potentially catastrophic ecological impacts to Mono Lake from the DWP diversions. This led to the formation of the Mono Lake Committee and a grassroots movement spanning over 30 years to stop the diversions and restore the basin California Water Wars.

1979: The California Department of Water Resources (CDWR) and the United States Department of the Interior (USDI) undertook a joint study of Mono Basin. The study concluded that the level of Mono Lake should be stabilized at 6,388 feet (1,947 m). To achieve this goal, drastic reductions of water exports from Mono Basin were recommended from the present annual average of 100,000 acre-feet (120,000,000 m^{3}) to a limit of 15,000 acre-feet (19,000,000 m^{3}). Legislation was introduced to implement this recommendation, but was never enacted.

1979: The National Audubon Society (Audubon), Mono Lake Committee, Friends of the Earth, the Los Angeles Audubon Society, and Mono Basin landowners initiated the original lawsuit with the Superior Court of Mono County in 1979 against Los Angeles Department of Water and Power (DWP), asserting that the diversions were a violation of the public trust doctrine, were both a public and private nuisance, and a violation of California State Constitution Article X, Section 4 & Article XVI, Section 6, which respectively prohibit obstruction of navigable waters and gifts by the state of a state asset. The suit attempted to establish Public Trust rights in Mono Basin, and sought declaratory and injunctive relief.

The Public Trust Case was originally argued as: National Audubon Society v. Los Angeles. Superior Court of Alpine County No. 6429.

The case was transferred to Alpine Superior Court; DWP filed a cross-complaint seeking adjudication of Basin water rights to all appropriators, naming 117 cross-defendants, including the plaintiffs, the State, United States Forest Service, U.S Bureau of Land Management, and other private water users.

DWP also sought a Congressional declaration stating they consented to the impairment of navigable waters of Mono Lake. Finally, DWP asserted that any nuisance at Mono Lake was attributable to the newly exposed lakebed and sought a declaration that conditions resulted from a valid exercise of the police power by the State of California. Simultaneously, Audubon sought permission to include a cause of action based on the federal common law of nuisance, asserting that Mono Lake is an "interstate or navigable" water in which there is an overriding federal interest, and DWP's diversions were causing water and air pollution.

Due to the inclusion of federal agencies, the suit was transferred to Federal District Court, where they decided abstention was appropriate and remanded. Accordingly, Audubon was instructed to file an action in state court to resolve two key issues: 1.) The interrelationship between the California water rights system and the public trust doctrine: Is the public trust doctrine in this context subsumed in the California water rights system, or does it function independently of that system? Could the plaintiffs challenge the DWP's permits by asserting the public trust doctrine limits their permits and licenses, or argue that the water diversions are not "reasonable or beneficial," as required under the California water rights system? And 2.) Whether exhaustion of administrative remedies was pursued or is applicable in this context.

This case eventually reached the Supreme Court of California, carrying this title: National Audubon Society v. Superior Court. 33 Cal. 3d 419 (1983).

== Case ==
At the beginning of the 20th century, the city of Los Angeles, which lies south of Mono Lake, began to undergo huge growth. As a result of this growth, the city needed additional sources of water. Around 1905, former Los Angeles Mayor, Fred Eaton, and his colleague William Mulholland, began to buy land in the Sierra Nevada region to secure water supply. The Owens River was utilized as a water source until 1919, and when the Owens River Valley began to dry up, Los Angeles investigated the Mono Basin area. In the 1930s, Los Angeles purchased 30,000 acres (120 km^{2}) of land in the Mono Basin. Over the next decade, Los Angeles took water from creeks and streams in the area. In 1919, Mono Lake had a water surface elevation of 6,428 feet (1,959 m) above mean sea level. In 1955, the elevation of the lake was reduced to 6,405 and still dropping. The decrease in water volume of the lake subsequently increased lake salinity, adversely affecting the local food chain. In 1980, there was a documented fifty percent reduction in the resident shrimp population, and by the spring of 1981, this reduction reached ninety five percent. Also, as the water level of Mono Lake dropped, an island within the lake that was key nesting habitat for bird species became accessible from shore (effectively becoming a peninsula), allowing coyotes access to the nesting habitat. The subsequent predation on nesting birds significantly reduced population numbers. As the level of the lake continued to drop, shoreline area increased, resulting in airborne dust and sediment transport that covered the lake with very fine silt and impacted water quality.

In 1976, a group of students from the University of California began to study the Mono Lake environment. Their research concluded that the lake's reduction in water level caused environmental damage, including the loss of the lake's brine shrimp, loss of migrating and nesting birds, and the destruction of the Mono Lake's natural beauty. In 1979, the National Audubon Society, Mono Lake Committee, Friends of the Earth, and four Mono Lake landowners filed suit against the DWP. Plaintiffs claimed that the waters of Mono Lake were protected from the DWP diversions by the public trust doctrine. The Supreme Court held that the state has an obligation to protect Mono Lake once the diversions begin to harm public trust interests. The court also held that California water law permitted the State Water Resources Control Board (SWRCB) to objectively study Mono Lake water rights after the agency granted the rights. Audubon claimed that air pollution in the form of alkali dust storms were caused by Mono Lake's dropping water level. On October 6, 1988, the United States Court of Appeals, Ninth Circuit, held that Audubon could not claim a federal common law nuisance based on air pollution. In 1984, when DWP threatened to once again dry the creek, a trout fisherman, Dick Dahlgren, joined by California Trout, filed suit against the DWP. Plaintiffs argued that not only did DWP violate the Public Trust Doctrine, it also violated the California Department of Fish and Game Code § 5937. From this case, the court required the DWP to release 19 cubic feet per second (0.54 m^{3}/s) into lower Rush Creek. In 1986, the Mono Lake Committee brought a similar lawsuit to protect Lee Vining Creek. The court ordered the DWP to maintain a flow of 10 cu ft/s (0.28 m^{3}/s) to the creek. In 1989, the court halted the case for four years to allow the State Water Resources Control Board (SWRCB) to produce an Environmental Impact Report in order to recondition DWP's water right licenses, and to prove compliance with the Public Trust Doctrine and the Fish and Game codes

During 1993–94, SWRCB Vice-Chairman Marc Del Piero, the attorney on the Board, served as the SWRCB's sole hearing officer and conducted the water rights hearings that lasted for over forty-three days <SWRCB Water Rights Decision 1631>. On September 28, 1994, the SWRCB unanimously adopted Order 1631 and ordered that the lake must be restored to a height of 6392 feet above sea level within the next 20 years. The DWP can continue to divert water during these 20 years, but only an average of 31,000 acre-feet (38,000,000 m^{3}) per year and the DWP must restore waterfowl and stream damage that resulted from past diversions.

== Issues ==
In this case, the California courts resolved two issues: The first issue was, whether the Public Trust Doctrine functions independently of the California Water Rights System. The public trust doctrine defines its purpose as maintaining, "All of its navigable, commerce, fishing, swimming, and other recreational purposes as trustee of a public trust for the benefit of the people." Therefore, the waterways cannot belong to just one person as private property; they must be available to all people.

The Public Trust Doctrine has also been expanded to protect lands in their natural state to serve as ecological units for scientific study. Mono Lake is a navigable waterway, and it harvests brine shrimp for sale as fish food. Under the traditional public trust cases, the lake is identified as a fishery. Plaintiffs sought to protect the lake's exceptional recreational and ecological value of the lake and its shore, the purity of the air, and the use of the lake for nesting and feeding by birds. Quoting Marks v. Whitney, the court said, "There is a growing public recognition that one of the most important public uses of the tidelands and use encompassed within the tidelands trust is the preservation of those lands in their natural state, so that they may serve as ecological units for scientific study, as open space, and as environments which provide food and habitat for birds and marine life, and which favorably affect the scenery and climate of the area." As a result, Mono Lake is a navigable water, and the beds, shores, and waters of the lake are protected by the public trust.

During the trial the court brought up two cases that dealt with non-navigable waterways. In 1884, the court considered impairment of navigability in the American and Sacramento rivers due to mining on their non-navigable tributaries. Gold Run Ditching and Mining Company used water cannons to wash gold bearing gravel from the hillsides. As a result, 600,000 cubic yards of sand and gravel went into the American River and washed downstream into the beds of both the American and Sacramento rivers. The court said "The State holds the absolute right to all navigable waters and the soils under them. The soil she holds as trustee of a public trust for the benefit of the people; and she may, by her legislature, grant it to an individual; but she cannot grant the rights of the people to the use of the navigable waters flowing over it…" In the second case, in 1901, the defendant in People v. Russ had built dams on sloughs, which flowed from the Salt River. The dams had been built to prevent water from flowing on to the defendant's land, but the state said they were a public nuisance. In the National Audubon case, DWP argued that when the Water Board approved a permit, the water right became a vested right. The California Supreme Court held that the public trust is "an affirmation of the duty of the state to protect the people's common heritage of streams, lakes, marshlands and tidelands, surrendering that right only in rare cases when the abandonment of that right is consistent with the purposes of the trust."

The second issue in this case was whether plaintiffs must exhaust their remedies before the Water Board prior to bringing action in court. The California Supreme Court determined that remedy can be pursued from the Water Board by challenging the unreasonable or unbeneficial use of appropriated water or by bringing an independent public trust claim. Therefore, the plaintiffs could claim that DWP's use of the water was unreasonable. Plaintiffs also could bring the public trust claim pursuant to section 2501 of the Water Code, which said, "The board may determine, in the proceedings provided for in this chapter, all rights to water of a stream system whether based upon appropriation, riparian right, or other basis of right." Section 2501 refers to water rights as bringing the proceedings before the Water Board.

== Decision ==
The California Supreme Court entered its decision in 1983 with the majority opinion written by Justice Broussard with Justices Bird, Mosk, Kaus and Reynoso, concurring. A separate concurring opinion was entered by Kaus. Justice Richardson issued an opinion concurring in part and dissenting in part. While the public trust doctrine protects navigable waterways like Mono Lake, the question remained whether diversions of non-navigable waters like the Mono Lake tributaries might also fall under the doctrine's scope. The majority concluded that when diversions of non-navigable tributaries impair the public interest in navigable waterways, the scope of the public trust doctrine is sufficiently broad to proscribe such actions. The applicability of the public trust doctrine to the case was described by the court as follows:

"The principal values plaintiffs seek to protect . . . are recreational and ecological . . . the scenic views of the lake and its shore, the purity of the air and the use of the lake for nesting and feeding by birds. Under Marks v. Whitney, supra, 6 Cal.3d 251, 98 Cal. Rptr. 790, 491 P.2d 374, it is clear that protection of these values is among the purposes of the public trust."

In examining the relationship between the public trust doctrine and appropriative water rights in California, the court determined that, in some cases, the public interest served by water diversions may outweigh considerations of harm to public trust sources. The population and economy of California depend on the appropriation of vast quantities of water for uses unrelated to trust values. However, the court held that harm to public trust resources should be avoided or minimized if feasible. The court stated that, under Article X, section 2 of the California Constitution "all uses of water, including public trust uses, must conform to the standard of reasonable use."

In concluding, the court stated that the water rights held by Los Angeles were granted in absence of consideration of the effects of the diversions on the public trust resources of the Mono Basin and that the allocation of water from the basin streams should be reconsidered. The state has a "duty" to protect the public's "common heritage of streams, lakes, marshlands, and tidelands." The court also ruled that the State Water Resource Control Board (SWRCB) and the courts have concurrent jurisdiction to consider the effect of water diversions on public trust resources. The court ordered a study to be prepared to determine the impact of DWP's diversion upon the public trust of Mono Lake. In subsequent proceedings following this decision, DWP has been ordered to reduce diversions by approximately two thirds until the water levels in Mono Lake recover to an acceptable level (expected to take decades).

== Dissent ==
Richardson concurred with parts one through four of the majority opinion (background and history of the Mono Lake litigation; the public trust doctrine in California; The California water rights system; and, the relationship between the public trust doctrine and the California water rights system) and with the analysis of the relationship between the public trust doctrine and the water rights system in this state. However, Richardson entered a dissent from part five of the opinion (exhaustion of administrative remedies) where the majority held that the courts and the California Water Resources Board have concurrent jurisdiction in cases of this kind. Richardson's dissent of part five concluded, "The majority's suggestion that various statutory provisions contemplate the exercise of concurrent jurisdiction in cases of this kind is unconvincing." In support of this, Richardson cited the Water Code (§§ 2000, 2001, 2075) as well as Environmental Defense Fund, Inc. v. East Bay Mun. Utility Dist (1980) and (1977).

== Legal and policy implications ==
The decision of the court expanded the reach of the public trust doctrine to non-navigable tributaries of navigable waters. This allows for legal challenges to be made to administrative decisions made by the state in regards water appropriations where natural resource values are affected. This potential for legal challenge on the basis of natural resource values forces administrative decisions to include specific consideration of long-term resource impairment in tandem with economic development. Therefore, although the public trust doctrine doesn't preclude the conveyance of water rights to a private party where a natural resource held in the public trust may be affected, following National Audubon Society v. Superior Court (1983), it does impose a condition on the future use of waters appropriated to further the public interest (the finding that harm must be minimized to the extent feasible). There are, however, broad discretionary powers for states and legislatures to define exactly what the public purpose is. As technology has advanced, waters of the U.S. have been used less for commerce and navigation, the basis for most current environmental law, and more for recreational purposes. In recognition of this, the public trust doctrine can also be employed, using the discretionary powers enjoyed by states for determining public purpose, as the basis for the preservation of a public interest in recreation. Other states, such as Montana, have integrated natural resource values and the public trust doctrine into appropriative water rights through allowing water to be appropriated for future uses that are protective of the environment or a resource (such as maintaining instream flows for water quality or habitat connectivity). In this way, states may establish an appropriative right for water that is integrated with the system of water law as the water is not "used" in the traditional sense of being diverted for commercial, agricultural, or industrial use, but is appropriated to remain in the stream channel. The overriding legal implication of the courts decision in National Audubon Society v. Superior Court (1983) is that traditional use of the public trust doctrine to ensure that valuable public resources are not lost to the public through diversion to public control has been altered to encompass an all-embracing environmental protection mechanism. In cases in which the traditional doctrine evolved to protect common rights of access for commercial purposes, the modern public trust doctrine proclaims conservationist principles.

== See also ==
- Mono Lake
- Los Angeles Department of Water and Power
- California Water Wars
