= California water wars =

Conflict over water rights in California between 1902 and 2006

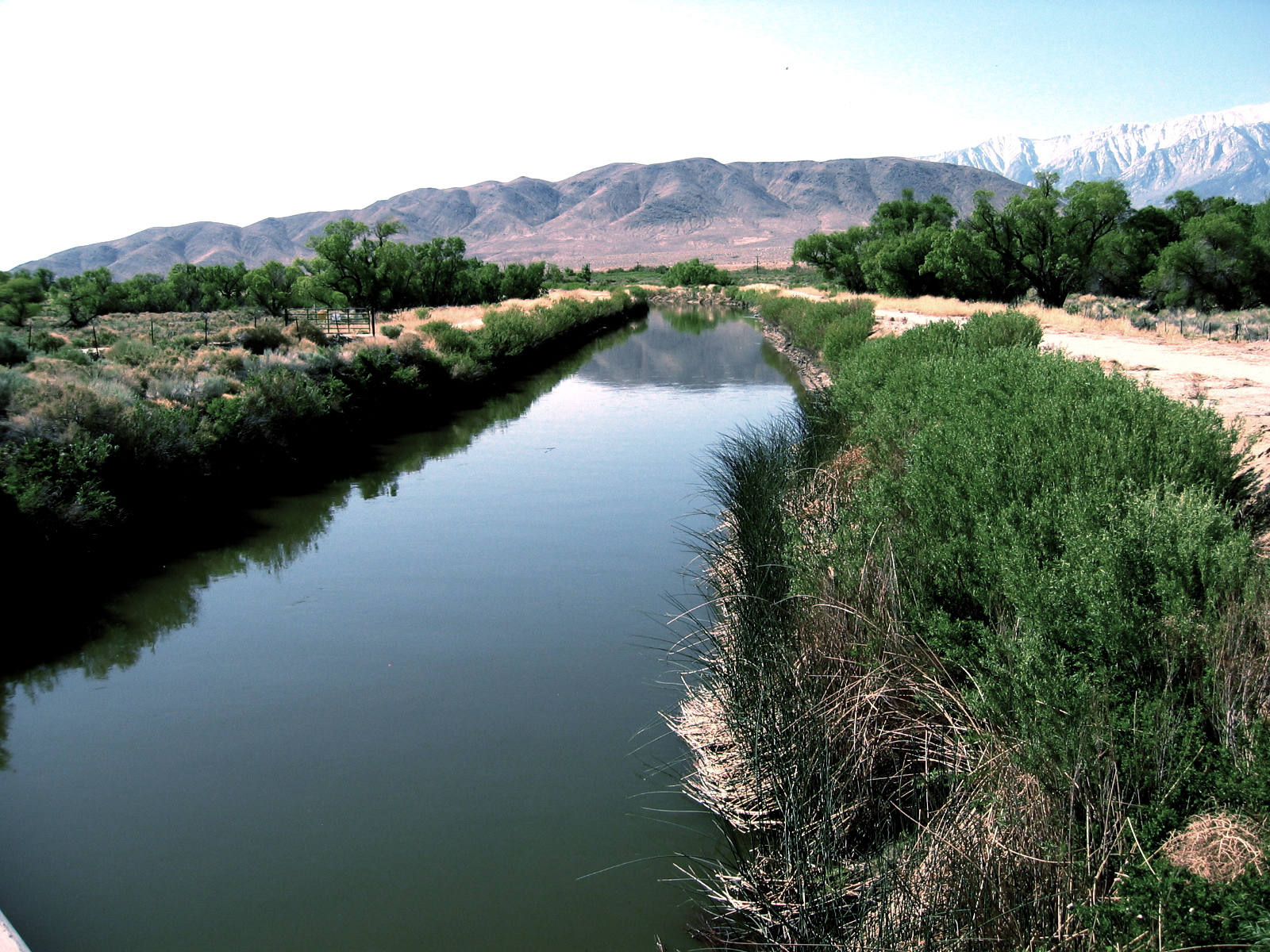
The Los Angeles Aqueduct in the Owens Valley

The California water wars were a series of political conflicts between the city of Los Angeles and farmers and ranchers in the Owens Valley of Eastern California over water rights.

As Los Angeles expanded during the late 19th century, it began to outgrow its water supply. Fred Eaton, mayor of Los Angeles, promoted a plan to take water from Owens Valley to Los Angeles via an aqueduct. The aqueduct construction was overseen by William Mulholland and was finished in 1913. The water rights were acquired through political fighting and, as described by one author, "chicanery, subterfuge ... and a strategy of lies".

Water from the Owens River started being diverted to Los Angeles in 1913, precipitating conflict and eventual ruin of the valley's economy. By the 1920s, so much water was diverted from the Owens Valley that agriculture became difficult. This led to the farmers trying to destroy the aqueduct in 1924. Los Angeles prevailed and kept the water flowing. By 1926, Owens Lake at the bottom of Owens Valley was completely dry due to water diversion.

The water needs of Los Angeles kept growing. In 1941, Los Angeles diverted water that previously fed Mono Lake, north of Owens Valley, into the aqueduct. Mono Lake's ecosystem for migrating birds was threatened by dropping water levels. Between 1979 and 1994, David Gaines and the Mono Lake Committee engaged in litigation with Los Angeles. The litigation forced Los Angeles to stop diverting water from around Mono Lake, which has started to rise back to a level that can support its ecosystem.

== Owens Valley context ==
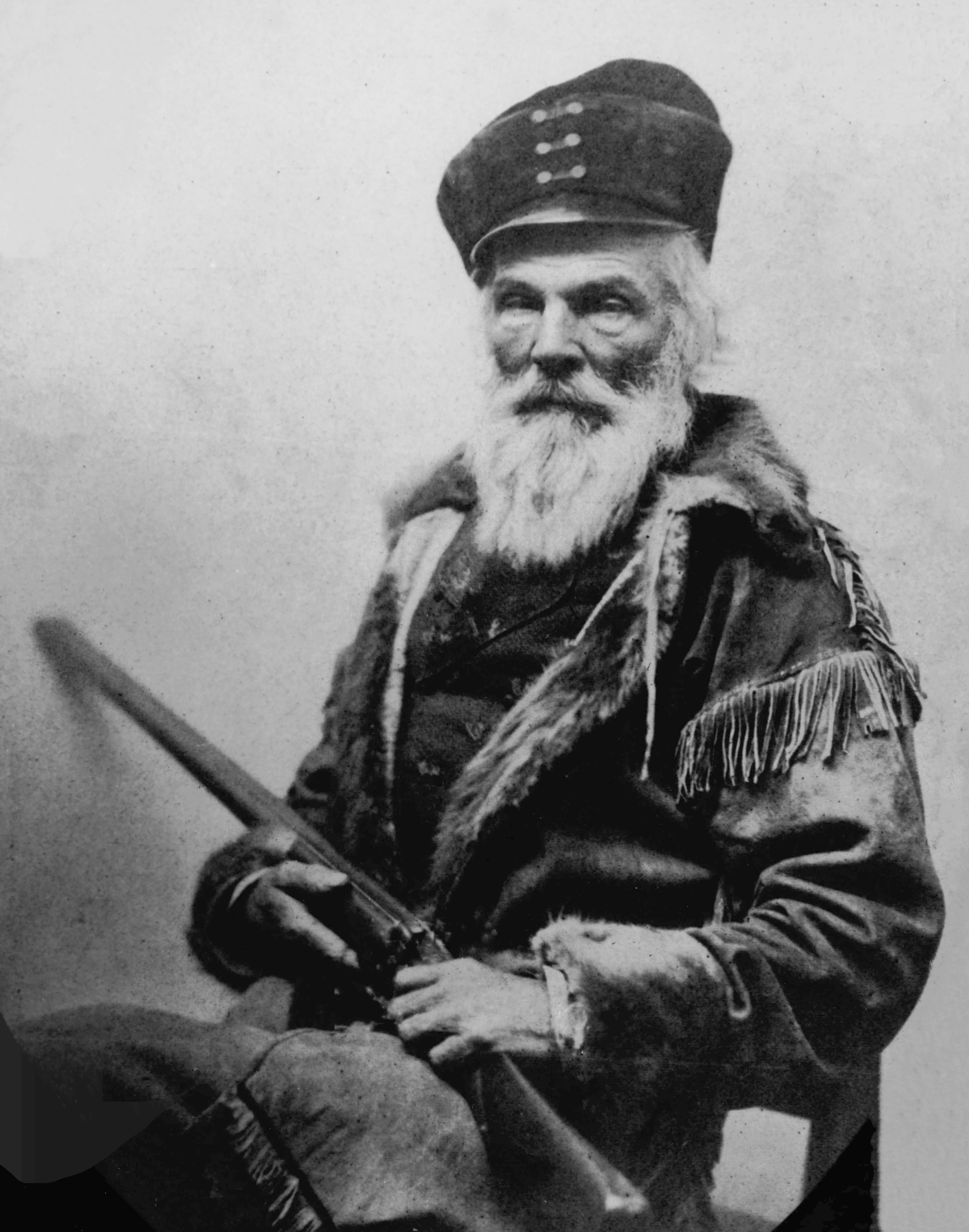
Joseph Reddeford Walker explored the Owens Valley

The Northern Paiute people were the inhabitants of the valley in the early 1800s, and used irrigation to grow crops.

In 1833, Joseph R. Walker led the first known expedition into the central California area that would later be called the Owens Valley. Walker saw that the valley's soil conditions were inferior to those on the other side of the Sierra Nevada range, and that runoff from the mountains was absorbed into the arid desert ground. After the United States gained control of California in 1848, the first public land survey conducted by A.W. von Schmidt from 1855 to 1856 was an initial step in securing government control of the valley. Von Schmidt reported that the valley's soil was not good for agriculture except for the land near streams, and stated that the "Owens Valley [was] worthless to the White Man."

In 1861, Samuel Addison Bishop and other ranchers started to raise cattle on the luxuriant grasses that grew in the Owens Valley. The ranchers came into conflict with the Paiutes over land and water use, and most of the Paiutes were driven away from the valley by the U.S. Army in 1863 during the Owens Valley Indian War.

Many settlers came to the area for the promise of riches from mining. The availability of water from the Owens River made farming and raising livestock attractive. The Homestead Act of 1862 gave pioneers five years to claim and take title of their land for a small filing fee and a charge of $1.25 per acre. The Homestead Act limited the land an individual could own to 160 acres (64.7 ha) in order to create small farms.

The amount of public land settled by the late 1870s and early 1880s was still relatively small. The Desert Land Act of 1877 allowed individuals to acquire more area, up to 640 acres (259.0 ha), in hopes of drawing more settlers by giving them enough land to make their settlement and land expenses worthwhile, but "included no residency requirements". By 1886, rapid acquisition of land had begun and by the mid-1890s, most of the land in the Owens Valley had been claimed. The large number of claims made by land speculators hindered the region's development because speculators would not participate in developing canals and ditches.

Before the Los Angeles Aqueduct, most of the 200 miles (320 km) of canals and ditches that constituted the irrigation system in the Owens Valley were in the north, while the southern region of the valley was mostly inhabited by people raising livestock. The irrigation systems created by the ditch companies did not have adequate drainage and as a result oversaturated the soil to the point where crops could not be raised. The irrigation systems also significantly lowered the water level in Owens Lake, a process that was intensified later by the diversion of water through the Los Angeles Aqueduct. At the start of the 20th century, the northern part of the Owens Valley turned to raising fruit, poultry and dairy.

== Los Angeles Aqueduct ==
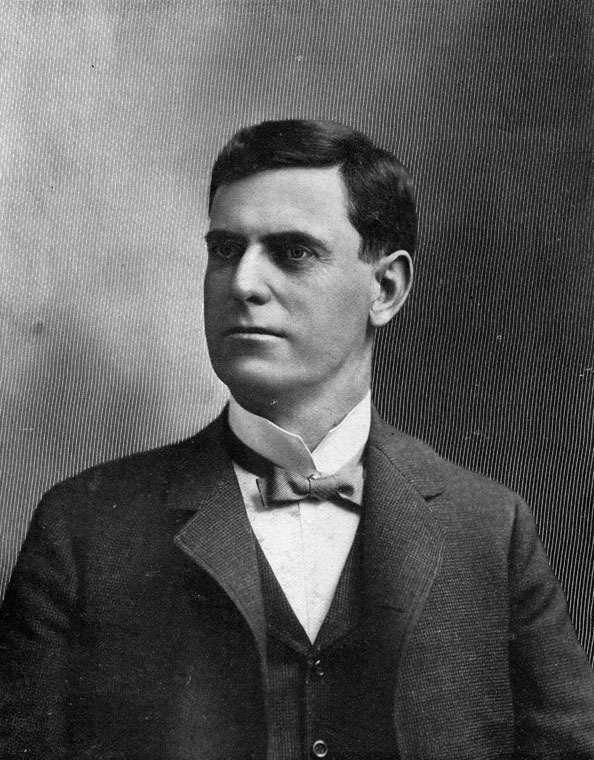
Frederick Eaton

Frederick Eaton and William Mulholland were two of the more visible principals in the California water wars. They were friends, having worked together in the private Los Angeles Water Company in the 1880s. In 1886, Eaton became City Engineer and Mulholland became superintendent of the Water Company. In 1898, Eaton was elected mayor of Los Angeles and was instrumental in converting the Water Company to city control in 1902. When the company became the Los Angeles Water Department, Mulholland continued to be superintendent, due to his extensive knowledge of the water system.

Eaton and Mulholland had a vision of a Los Angeles that would become far larger than the Los Angeles of the start of the 20th century. The limiting factor of Los Angeles's growth was water supply. "If you don't get the water, you won't need it," Mulholland famously remarked. Eaton and Mulholland realized that the Owens Valley had a large amount of runoff from the Sierra Nevada, and a gravity-fed aqueduct could deliver the Owens water to Los Angeles.

=== Obtaining water rights 1902–1907 ===
At the start of the 20th century, the United States Bureau of Reclamation, at the time known as the United States Reclamation Service, was planning on building an irrigation system to help the farmers of the Owens Valley, which would block Los Angeles from diverting the water.

From 1902 to 1905, Eaton and Mulholland used underhanded methods to obtain water rights and block the Bureau of Reclamation. The regional engineer of the Bureau, Joseph Lippincott, was a close associate of Eaton; Eaton was a nominal agent for the Bureau through Lippincott, so Eaton had access to inside information about water rights and could recommend actions to the Bureau that would be beneficial to Los Angeles. In return, while Lippincott was employed by the Bureau, he also served as a paid private consultant to Eaton, advising Los Angeles on how to best obtain water rights.

To help acquire water rights in 1905, Eaton made high offers to purchase land in Owens Valley. Eaton's eagerness aroused suspicion in a few local Inyo County people. Eaton bought land as a private citizen, hoping to sell it back to Los Angeles at a tidy profit. Eaton claimed in an interview with the Los Angeles Express in 1905 that he turned over all his water rights to the City of Los Angeles without being paid for them, "except that I retained the cattle which I had been compelled to take in making the deals ... and mountain pasture land of no value except for grazing purposes". Eaton moved to the Owens Valley to become a cattle rancher on the land he purchased. Eaton always denied that he acted in a deceptive manner.

Mulholland misled Los Angeles public opinion by dramatically understating the amount of water locally available for Los Angeles's growth. Mulholland also misled residents of the Owens Valley: he indicated that Los Angeles would only use unused flows in the Owens Valley, while planning on using the full water rights to fill the aquifer of the San Fernando Valley.

By 1907, Eaton was busy acquiring key water rights and traveling to Washington to meet with advisers of Theodore Roosevelt to convince them that the water of the Owens River would do more good flowing through faucets in Los Angeles than it would if used on Owens Valley fields and orchards.

The dispute over the Owens River water became a political dispute in Washington. Los Angeles needed rights of way across federal land to build the aqueduct. California Senator Frank Flint sponsored a bill to grant the rights of way, but Congressman Sylvester Smith of Inyo County opposed the bill. Smith argued that irrigating Southern California was not more valuable than irrigating Owens Valley. While a compromise was being negotiated, Flint appealed to President Roosevelt. Roosevelt met with Flint, Secretary of the Interior Ethan A. Hitchcock, Bureau of Forests Commissioner Gifford Pinchot, and Director of the Geological Survey Charles D. Walcott. In this meeting, Roosevelt decided in favor of Los Angeles.

Several authors, such as Rolle and Libecap, argue that Los Angeles paid an unfairly low price to the farmers of Owens Valley for their land. Gary Libecap of the University of California, Santa Barbara observed that the price that Los Angeles was willing to pay to other water sources per volume of water was far higher than what the farmers received. Farmers who resisted the pressure from Los Angeles until 1930 received the highest price for their land; most farmers sold their land from 1905 to 1925, and received less than Los Angeles was actually willing to pay. However, the sale of their land brought the farmers substantially more income than if they had kept the land for farming and ranching. None of the sales were made under threat of eminent domain.

The aqueduct was sold to the citizens of Los Angeles as vital to the growth of the city. Unknown to the public, the initial water would be used to irrigate the San Fernando Valley to the north, which was not at the time a part of the city. From a hydrological point of view, the San Fernando Valley was ideal: its aquifer could serve as free water storage without evaporation. One obstacle to the irrigation was the Los Angeles City Charter, which prohibited the sale, lease, or other use of the city's water without a two-thirds approval by the voters. This charter limitation would be avoided through the annexation of a large portion of the San Fernando Valley to the city. The annexation would also raise the debt limit of Los Angeles, which allowed the financing of the aqueduct.

The San Fernando land syndicate were a group of wealthy investors who bought up large tracts of land in the San Fernando Valley with secret inside information from Eaton. The syndicate included friends of Eaton, such as Harrison Gray Otis and Henry E. Huntington. This syndicate made substantial efforts to support passage of the bond issue that funded the aqueduct. These efforts are reported to have included the dumping of water from Los Angeles reservoirs into the sewers (thereby creating a false drought) and by publishing scare articles in the Los Angeles Times, which Otis published. Remi Nadeau, a historian and author, disputed that water was dumped from reservoirs, because the sewer system may not have been connected to the reservoirs. The syndicate did unify the business community behind the aqueduct, and its purchases were public by the time the vote on the aqueduct was taken.

=== The building and operation of the aqueduct 1908–1928 ===
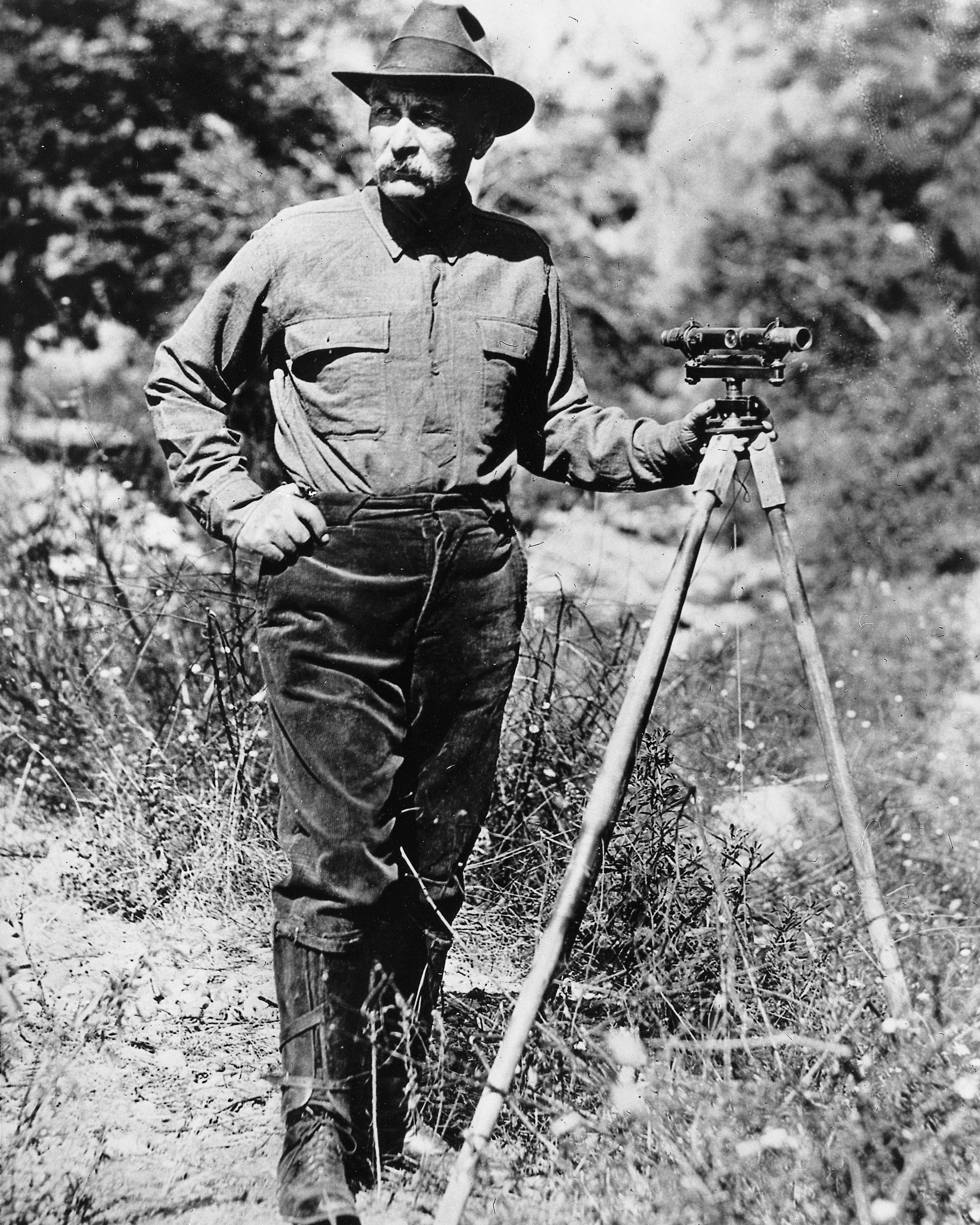
William Mulholland with a surveyor's transit, ca.1908–1913

From 1907 through 1913, Mulholland directed the building of the aqueduct. The 233-mile (375 km) Los Angeles Aqueduct, inaugurated in November 1913, required more than 2,000 workers and the digging of 164 tunnels. Mulholland's granddaughter has stated that the complexity of the project was comparable to the building of the Panama Canal. Water from the Owens River reached a reservoir in the San Fernando Valley on November 5, 1913. At a ceremony that day, Mulholland spoke his famous words about this engineering feat: "There it is. Take it."

After the aqueduct was completed in 1913, the San Fernando investors demanded so much water from the Owens Valley that it started to transform from "The Switzerland of California" into a desert. Mulholland was blocked from obtaining additional water from the Colorado River, so decided to take all available water from the Owens Valley.

In 1923, farmers and ranchers formed an irrigation cooperative headed by Wilfred and Mark Watterson, owners of the Inyo County Bank. By exploiting personal bitterness of some of the farmers, Los Angeles managed to acquire some of the key water rights of the cooperative. After these water rights were secured, inflows to Owens Lake were heavily diverted, which caused the lake to dry up by 1924.

By 1924, farmers and ranchers rebelled. A series of provocations by Mulholland were, in turn, followed by corresponding threats from local farmers, and the destruction of Los Angeles property. Finally, a group of armed ranchers seized the Alabama Gates and dynamited part of the system, letting water return to the Owens River.

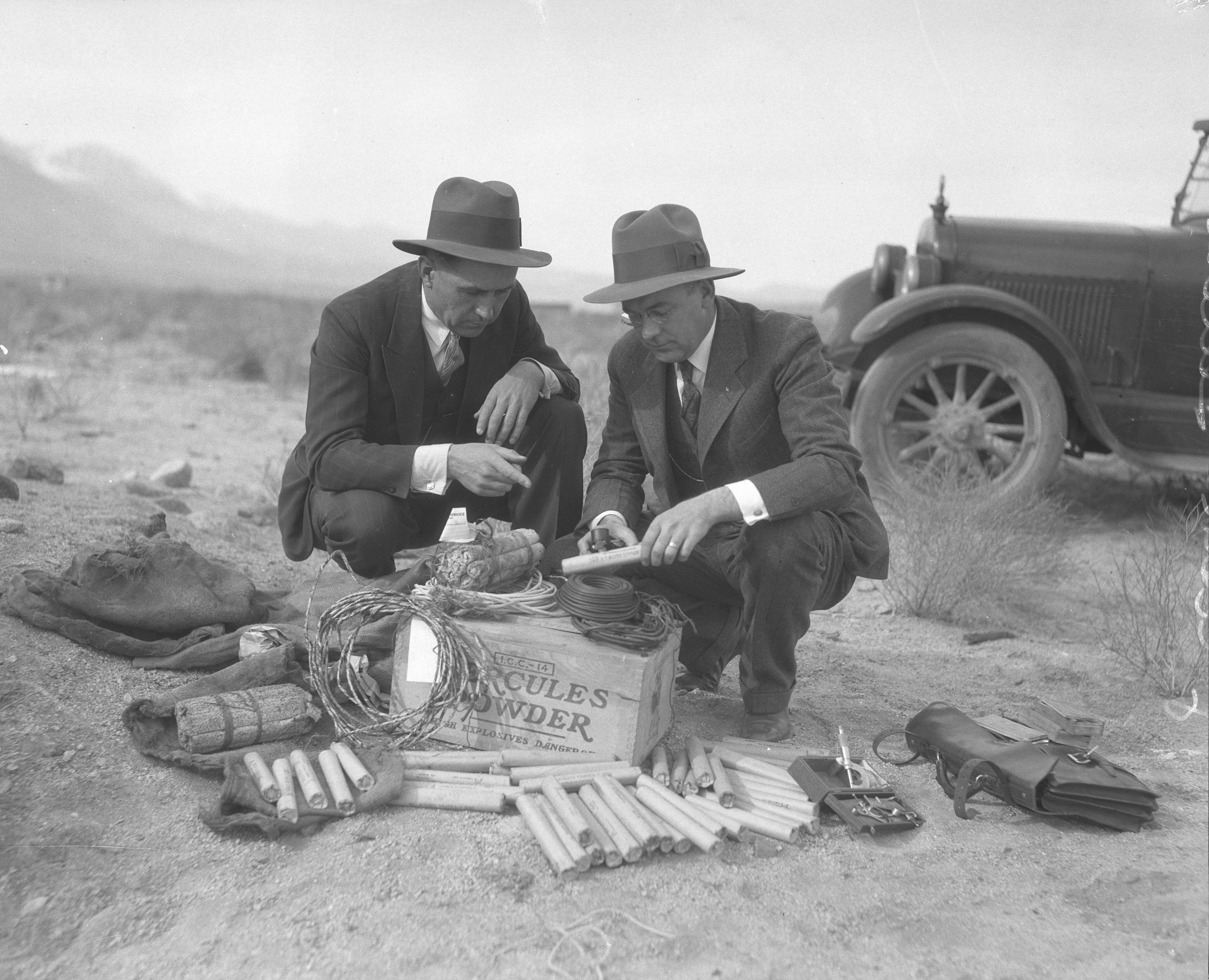
Dynamite found during sabotage incidents of Owens Valley Aqueduct, circa 1924

In August 1927, when the conflict was at its height, the Inyo County bank collapsed, which massively undermined valley resistance. An audit revealed that there were shortages in both cash in the vault and amounts shown on the books. The Watterson brothers were indicted for embezzlement, then tried and convicted on thirty-six counts. Since all local business had been transacted through their bank, the closure left merchants and customers with little more than the small amount of money they had on hand. The brothers claimed that the fraud was done for the good of the Owens Valley against Los Angeles, and this excuse was generally believed to be true in Inyo County. The collapse of the bank wiped out the lifetime savings of many people, including payments gained from the sale of homes and ranches to Los Angeles.

In the face of the collapse of resistance and of the Owens Valley economy, the attacks on the aqueduct ceased. The City of Los Angeles sponsored a series of repair and maintenance programs for aqueduct facilities that stimulated some local employment, and the Los Angeles water employees were paid a month in advance to bring some relief. But it was impossible to prevent many businesses from closing their doors.

The City of Los Angeles continued to purchase private land holdings and their water rights to meet the increasing demands. By 1928, Los Angeles owned 90 percent of the water in Owens Valley and agriculture interests in the region were effectively dead.

== The second Owens Valley Aqueduct, 1970–present ==
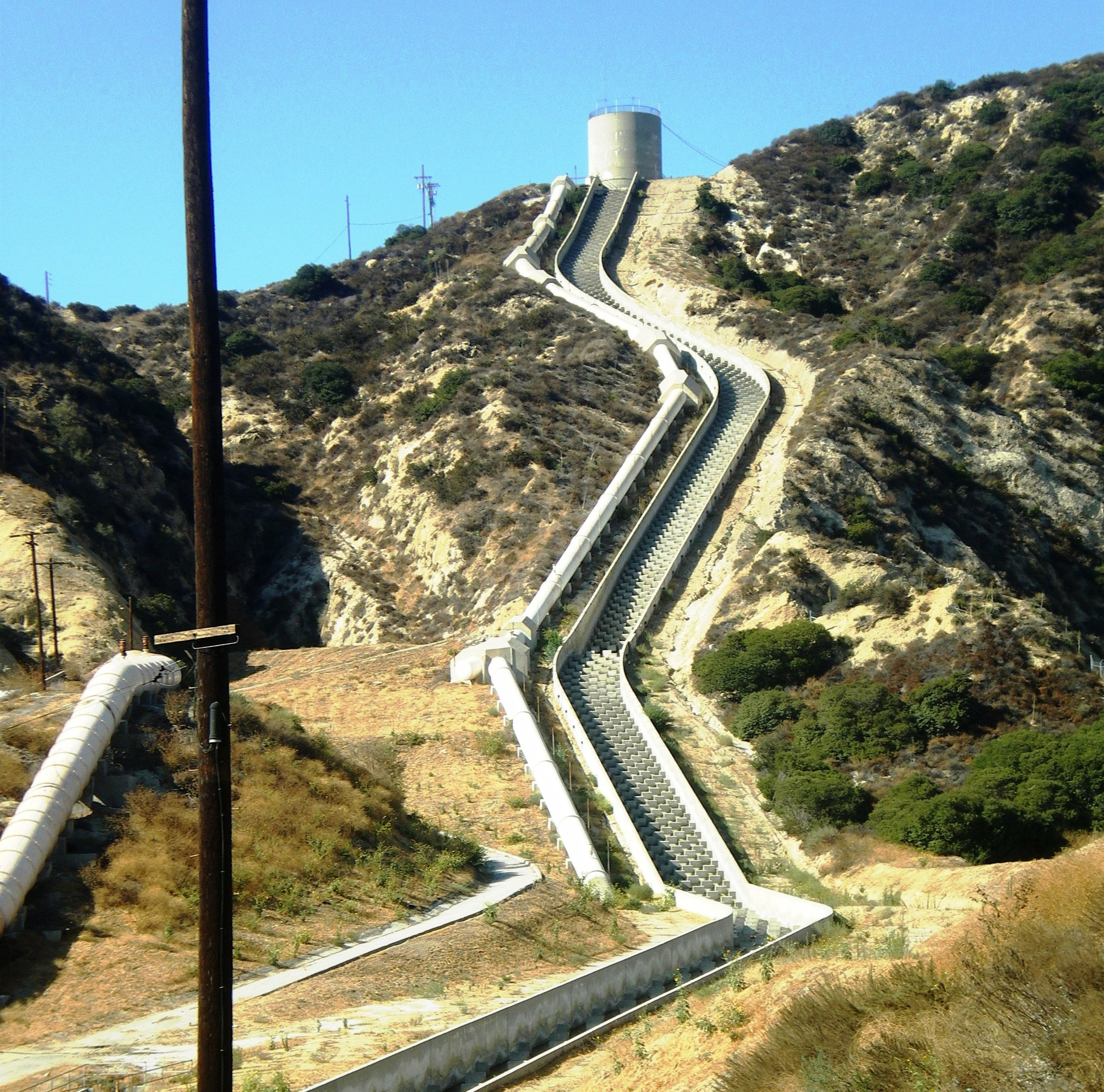
Terminus of the Second Los Angeles Aqueduct, near Sylmar.

In 1970, LADWP completed a second aqueduct. In 1972, the agency began to divert more surface water and pumped groundwater at the rate of several hundred thousand acre-feet a year (several cubic meters per second). Owens Valley springs and seeps dried and disappeared, and groundwater-dependent vegetation began to die.

Because LADWP had never completed an Environmental Impact Report (EIR) addressing the impacts of groundwater pumping, Inyo County sued Los Angeles under the terms of the California Environmental Quality Act. Los Angeles did not stop pumping groundwater, but submitted a short EIR in 1976 and a second one in 1979, both of which were rejected as inadequate by the courts.

In 1991, Inyo County and the city of Los Angeles signed the Inyo-Los Angeles Long Term Water Agreement, which required that groundwater pumping be managed to avoid significant impacts while providing a reliable water supply for Los Angeles. In 1997, Inyo County, Los Angeles, the Owens Valley Committee, the Sierra Club, and other concerned parties signed a Memorandum of Understanding that specified terms by which the lower Owens River would be re-watered by June 2003 as partial mitigation for damage to the Owens Valley.

In spite of the terms of the Long Term Water Agreement, studies by the Inyo County Water Department from 2003 onward showed that impacts to the valley's groundwater-dependent vegetation, such as alkali meadows, continue. Likewise, Los Angeles did not re-water the lower Owens River by the June 2003 deadline. In December, 2003, LADWP settled a lawsuit brought by California Attorney General Bill Lockyer, the Owens Valley Committee, and the Sierra Club. Under the terms of the settlement, deadlines for the Lower Owens River Project were revised and LADWP was to return water to the lower Owens River by 2005. This deadline was missed, but on December 6, 2006, a ceremony was held at the same site where William Mulholland had ceremonially opened the aqueduct which had closed the flow through the Owens River, to restart it down the 62 miles (100 km) river. David Nahai, president of the L.A. Water and Power Board, countered Mulholland's words from 1913 and said, "There it is ... take it back."

Nevertheless, groundwater pumping continues at a higher rate than the rate at which water recharges the aquifer, resulting in a long-term trend of desertification in the Owens Valley.

== Mono Lake ==
By the 1930s, the water requirements for Los Angeles continued to increase. LADWP started buying water rights in the Mono Basin (the next basin to the north of the Owens Valley). An extension to the aqueduct was built, which included such engineering feats as tunneling through the Mono Craters (an active volcanic field). By 1941, the extension was finished, and water in various creeks (such as Rush Creek) were diverted into the aqueduct. To satisfy California water law, LADWP set up a fish hatchery on Hot Creek, near Mammoth Lakes, California.

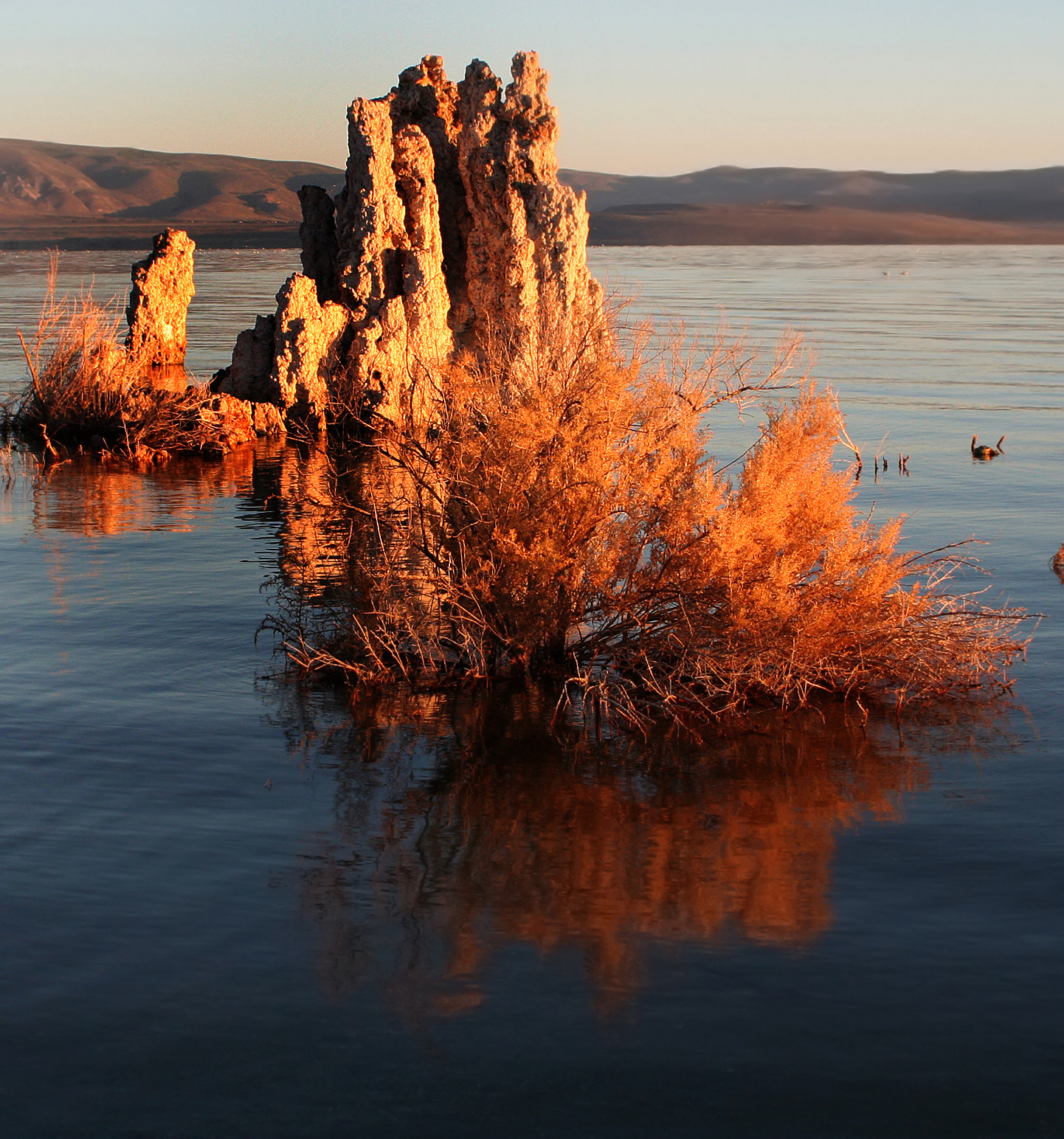
Tufa towers in Mono Lake were exposed by water diversions.

The diverted creeks had previously fed Mono Lake, an inland body of water with no outlet. Mono Lake served as a vital ecosystem link, where gulls and migratory birds would nest. Because the creeks were diverted, the water level in Mono Lake started to fall, exposing tufa formations. The water became more saline and alkaline, threatening the brine shrimp that lived in the lake. Increases in salinity decreased adult size, growth rates, and brood sizes, and increased female mortality during their reproductive cycle. Changing levels in salinity as a result of water diversion put this species at risk, as well as the birds that nested on two islands (Negit Island and Paoha Island) in the lake. Falling water levels started making a land bridge to Negit Island, which allowed predators to feed on bird eggs for the first time.

In 1974, David Gaines started to study the biology of Mono Lake. In 1975, while at Stanford, he started to get others interested in the ecosystem of Mono Lake. This led to a 1977 report on the ecosystem of Mono Lake that highlighted dangers caused by the water diversion. In 1978, the Mono Lake Committee was formed to protect Mono Lake. The committee (and the National Audubon Society) sued LADWP in 1979, arguing that the diversions violated the public trust doctrine, which states that navigable bodies of water must be managed for the benefit of all people. The litigation reached the California Supreme Court by 1983, which ruled in favor of the committee. Further litigation was initiated in 1984, which claimed that LADWP did not comply with the state fishery protection laws.

Eventually, all of the litigation was adjudicated in 1994, by the California State Water Resources Control Board (SWRCB). The SWRCB hearings lasted for 44 days and were conducted by Board Vice-chair Marc Del Piero acting as the sole Hearing Officer. In that ruling (SWRCB Decision 1631), the SWRCB established significant public trust protection and eco-system restoration standards, and LADWP was required to release water into Mono Lake to raise the lake level 17.4 feet (5.3 m) above the then-current level of 42.4 feet (12.9 m) below the 1941 level. As of 2024, the water level in Mono Lake has risen 8.8 feet (2.7 m) of the required 17.4 feet (5.3 m). Los Angeles made up for the lost water through state-funded conservation and recycling projects.

== Central Valley ==
In February 2014, after three consecutive years of below-normal rainfall, California faced its most severe drought emergency in decades with fish populations in the Sacramento–San Joaquin River Delta in unprecedented crisis due to the decades of large-scale water exports from Northern California to south of the Delta via state and federal water projects. Half a million acres of Central Valley farmland supposedly was in danger of going fallow due to drought. On 5 February 2014 the House passed a bill to increase flows from the Sacramento–San Joaquin River Delta to the Central Valley, the Sacramento-San Joaquin Valley Emergency Water Delivery Act (H.R. 3964; 113th Congress). This would suspend the very recent efforts to restore the San Joaquin River since 2009, won after 18 years of litigation, with increased releases from the Friant Dam east of Fresno. Democratic Senators Dianne Feinstein and Barbara Boxer proposed emergency drought legislation of $300 million aid, and to speed up environmental reviews of water projects, so state and federal officials have "operational flexibility" to move water south, from the delta to San Joaquin Valley farms.

On February 14, 2014, President Barack Obama visited near Fresno and announced $170 million worth of initiatives, with $100 million for ranchers facing livestock losses and $60 million to help food banks. Obama joked about the lengthy and incendiary history of water politics in California, saying, "I'm not going to wade into this. I want to get out alive on Valentine's Day."

== Documentaries and fiction ==
The California water wars were among the subjects discussed in Cadillac Desert, a 1984 nonfiction book by Marc Reisner about land development and water policy in the western United States. The book was made into a four-part documentary of the same name in 1997.

The 1974 film Chinatown was inspired by the California water wars and features a fictionalized version of the conflict as a central plot element.

== See also ==
- Water conflicts
- Water in California
- California State Water Project
- Central Valley Project
- Sacramento–San Joaquin River Delta
- San Joaquin River
- Sacramento River
- Drought in the United States
- Water scarcity
- Atmospheric water generator
- Desalination
- Hydropolitics
