= David Gaines =

David Gaines may refer to:

- David "Smokey" Gaines (1942–2020), American basketball player and coach
- David Gaines (environmentalist) (1947–1988), founder of the Mono Lake Committee
- David Gaines (racing driver) (1963–1990), NASCAR Limited Sportsman Division race car driver
- David Gaines (composer) (born 1961), United States musician and composer
