= Sacramento-San Joaquin Valley Emergency Water Delivery Act =

- Long title: To address certain water-related concerns in the Sacramento-San Joaquin Valley, and for other purposes.
- Announced in: the 113th United States Congress
- Sponsored by: Rep. David Valadao (R-CA)

Legislative history
- Introduced in the House as H.R. 3964 by Rep. David Valadao (R-CA) on January 29, 2014; Committee consideration by United States House Committee on Natural Resources; Passed the House on February 5, 2014 (Roll Call Vote #50: 229-191)

The Sacramento-San Joaquin Valley Emergency Water Delivery Act (H.R. 3964) is a bill that tries to address the severe California drought. The bill would change some environmental regulations and stop or delay a project designed to restore a dried up section of the San Joaquin River (a habitat for some salmon). The bill was considered highly partisan and there are disputes over how much it would solve the water problem, or even intended to solve it, as opposed to an election year ploy unlikely to pass Congress.

It passed the United States House of Representatives on February 5, 2014, during the 113th United States Congress.

== Background ==
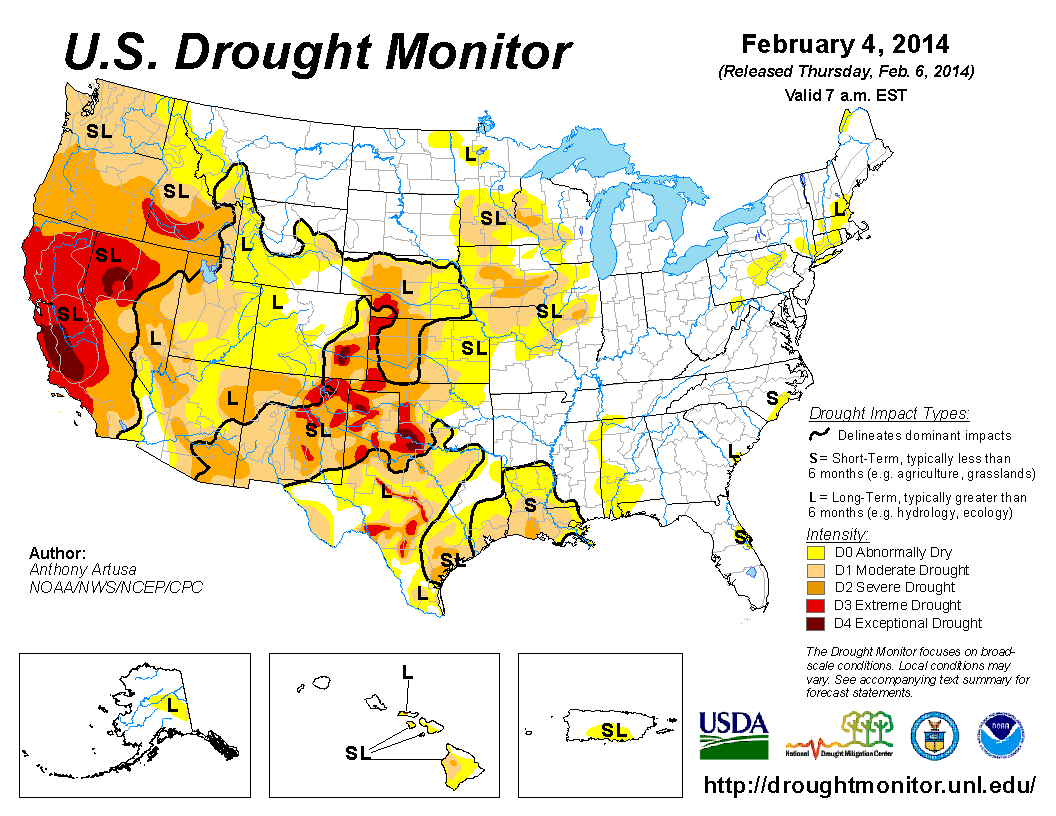
United States Drought Monitor from February 4, 2014

California's interconnected water system serves over 30 million people and irrigates over 5,680,000 acres (2,300,000 ha) of farmland. As the world's largest, most productive, and most controversial water system, it manages over 40,000,000 acre-feet (49 km^{3}) of water per year.

California has had water problems for decades. The state is forced to contend with the different needs and wants of the agriculture industry, environmentalists, and everyday home water consumers.

== Provisions of the bill ==
This summary is based largely on the summary provided by the Congressional Research Service, a public domain source.

The Sacramento-San Joaquin Valley Emergency Water Delivery Act has several titles.

Title I: Central Valley Project Water Reliability Title I would amend the Central Valley Project Improvement Act (CVPIA) to include among the Act's purposes: (1) to ensure that water dedicated to fish and wildlife purposes is replaced and provided to Central Valley Project (CVP) water contractors by December 31, 2018, at the lowest cost reasonably achievable, and (2) to facilitate and expedite water transfers in accordance with that Act. The bill would redefine "anadromous fish" for purposes of such Act. It would also define "reasonable flows" as water flows capable of being maintained taking into account competing consumptive uses of water and economic, environmental, and social factors.

It would eliminate existing limitations on the authority of the Secretary of the Interior to enter into any new contracts for water supply from the CVP. It would direct the Secretary to renew any existing long-term repayment or water service contract, upon request of the contractor, that provides for the delivery of water from the CVP for a period of 40 years (the current contractual term is 25 years). It would require new or renewed contracts to include a provision that requires the Secretary to charge only for water actually delivered.

It would direct the Secretary to take all necessary actions to facilitate and expedite CVP water transfers in accordance with such Act or any other provision of federal reclamation law and the National Environmental Policy Act of 1969 (NEPA).

It would grant the Secretary discretion to modify CVP operations to provide reasonable water flows of suitable quality, quantity, and timing to protect all life stages of anadromous fish.

It would repeal a requirement that not less than 67% of all funds made available to the Restoration Fund under CVPIA be authorized to be appropriated to carry out habitat restoration, improvement, and acquisition provisions of that Act.

The bill would require the CVP and the California State Water Project (SWP) to be operated pursuant to the water quality standards and operational constraints described in the "Principles for Agreement of the Bay-Delta Standards Between the State of California and the Federal Government," dated December 15, 1994 (Bay-Delta Accord of 1994), without regard to the Endangered Species Act of 1973 (ESA) or any other law pertaining to the operation of the CVP and the SWP.

The bill would prohibit the Secretaries of the Interior and Commerce from distinguishing between natural-spawned and hatchery-spawned or otherwise artificially propagated strains of a species in making any determination under ESA that relates to any anadromous fish species that are present in the Sacramento and San Joaquin Rivers or their tributaries and that ascend those rivers and their tributaries to reproduce after maturing in the San Francisco Bay or the Pacific Ocean.

The bill would add the Kettleman City Community Services District as an authorized service area of the CVP. The bill would direct the Secretary to enter into a long-term contract for the delivery of up to 900 acre-feet of CVP water for municipal and industrial use.

The bill would direct the Secretary to offer to the Oakdale Irrigation District, the South San Joaquin Irrigation District, and the Calaveras County Water District a contract enabling such districts to collectively impound and store a portion of their Stanislaus River water rights in the New Melones Reservoir in accordance with applicable terms of the Warren Act.

The bill would establish a pilot program to remove non-native predatory fish from the Stanislaus River.

The bill would direct the Secretary, if the San Luis Reservoir does not fill by the last day of February, to permit any entity with an agricultural water service or repayment contract for the delivery of water from the Delta Division or the San Luis Unit to reschedule into the immediately following contract year (i.e., March 1 through the last day of February) any unused CVP water previously allocated for irrigation purposes.

Title II: San Joaquin River Restoration - Title II would direct the Secretary of the Interior to cease any action to implement the Stipulation of Settlement dated September 13, 2006, in the litigation entitled Natural Resources Defense Council, et al. v. Kirk Rodgers, et al., U.S. District Court, Eastern District of California.

The bill would amend the San Joaquin River Restoration Settlement Act to eliminate references to such Stipulation of Settlement and to direct the Secretary, beginning on March 1, 2015, to modify Friant Dam operations to release restoration flows in a manner that improves the fishery in the San Joaquin River between Friant Dam and Gravelly Ford. The bill would direct the Secretary, prior to October 1, 2015, to: (1) identify the impacts associated with the release of such restoration flows; (2) identify measures necessary to mitigate impacts on adjacent and downstream water users, landowners, and agencies as a result of such restoration flows; and (3) implement all such mitigation measures identified before such restoration flows are commenced.

The bill would repeat provisions relating to settlement of litigation regarding restoration of the San Joaquin River reintroduction of the California Central Valley Spring Run Chinook salmon into such River.

Title III: Repayment Contracts and Acceleration of Repayment of Construction Costs - Title III would direct the Secretary of the Interior, upon request of the contractor, to convert all existing long-term CVP contracts to contracts that require a contractor to pay the remaining balance of construction at a Treasury rate discount.

Title IV: Bay-Delta Watershed Water Rights Preservation and Protection - Title IV would direct the Secretary of the Interior (notwithstanding the provisions of this Act, federal reclamation law, or the ESA), in the operation of CVP, to: (1) strictly adhere to state water rights law governing water rights priorities by honoring water rights senior to those belonging to CVP, regardless of the source of priority; and (2) strictly adhere to and honor water rights and other priorities that are obtained or that exist under the California Water Code. The bill would require any action taken by the Secretary or the Secretary of Commerce to protect any species listed under the ESA that affects the diversion of water or involves the release of water from any CVP water storage facility to be applied in a manner that is consistent with water rights priorities established by state law.

The bill would direct the Secretary and the Secretary of Commerce, in implementing the ESA in the Bay-Delta and on the Sacramento River, to apply any limitations on the operation of CVP or to formulate any reasonable prudent alternative associated with CVP's operation in a manner that strictly adheres to and applies water rights priorities for project water and base supply provided for in the Sacramento River settlement contracts.

The bill would direct the Secretary, subject to the absolute priority of Sacramento River settlement contractors, to allocate water provided for irrigation purposes to existing CVP agricultural water service contractors within the Sacramento River Watershed.

The bill would direct the Secretary to ensure that there are no redirected adverse water supply or fiscal impacts to those within the Sacramento River or San Joaquin River watershed or to the SWP arising from the Secretary's operation of CVP to meet legal obligations.

Title V: Miscellaneous - Title V declares that: (1) coordinated operations between CVP and SWP, previously requested and consented to by the state of California and the federal government, require assertion of federal supremacy to protect existing water rights throughout the system; (2) these circumstances are unique to California; and (3) nothing in this Act shall serve as precedent in any other state.

The bill would declare that this Act shall not affect the Proclamation of State of Emergency and the associated executive order issued on January 17, 2014, by the Governor of California.

The bill would amend the Wild and Scenic Rivers Act to: (1) decrease the length of a segment of the Lower Merced River in California designated as a wild and scenic river; and (2) revise provisions concerning the water surface level of Lake McClure in Mariposa County, California.

== Congressional Budget Office report ==
This summary is based largely on the summary provided by the Congressional Budget Office, a public domain source.

H.R. 3964 would amend the Central Valley Project Improvement Act and the San Joaquin River Restoration Settlement Act to change water management plans and environmental restoration goals for the Central Valley region in California. The bill would authorize the Bureau of Reclamation to convert some water service contracts to accelerated repayment contacts, which would increase receipts to the federal government in the first few years after enactment, but reduce receipts in subsequent years. Staff of the Joint Committee on Taxation estimates that some of those accelerated payments would be financed with bonds exempt from federal taxation, leading to a revenue loss. The bill also would impose a specified timeline for water transfers among the Central Valley Project contractors and would deem certain water transfers to have met the requirements of some environmental laws. CBO expects that those changes would result in more water transfers, leading to additional offsetting receipts of $1 million annually.

== Procedural history ==
The Sacramento-San Joaquin Valley Emergency Water Delivery Act was introduced into the United States House of Representatives on January 29, 2014, by Rep. David Valadao (R-CA). It was referred to the United States House Committee on Natural Resources. The bill was sponsored by the California Republican congressmen - all 15 of them. On February 5, 2014, the House voted in Roll Call Vote #50 to pass the bill 229–191.

== Debate and discussion ==
The 68 page bill was supported primarily by Republicans. The White House threatened to veto the bill. Republican supporters of the bill argued that the current situation prioritized the well-being of fish over human farmers. They blamed the federal government and environmental legislation for the ongoing water problems.

Some Democrats insisted that the problem was not environmental regulation, but a lack of rain. Rep. Mike Thompson (D-CA) said that "it would be more productive for this body (Congress) to join in a rain dance on the floor today than to pass this bill." California governor Jerry Brown opposed the bill, saying that it "falsely suggests the promise of water relief when that is simply not possible given the scarcity of water supplies." Environmental groups and Democrats opposing the bill have argued that it is a "political power play that undermines years of delicate negotiations." Democrats accused Republicans of pursuing the bill not to solve the water problems, but to gain votes in the November 2014 congressional elections from people in districts hit hard by the drought.

In that sense, Democratic Senators Dianne Feinstein and Barbara Boxer proposed a 31-page emergency drought legislation of $300 million aid, and to speed up environmental reviews of water projects, so state and federal officials have "operational flexibility" to move water from the delta to San Joaquin Valley farms.

== See also ==
- List of bills in the 113th United States Congress
- Drought in the United States
- Sacramento–San Joaquin River Delta
- California Water Wars
