= William Mulholland =

Engineer and builder of the Los Angeles Aqueduct (1855–1935)

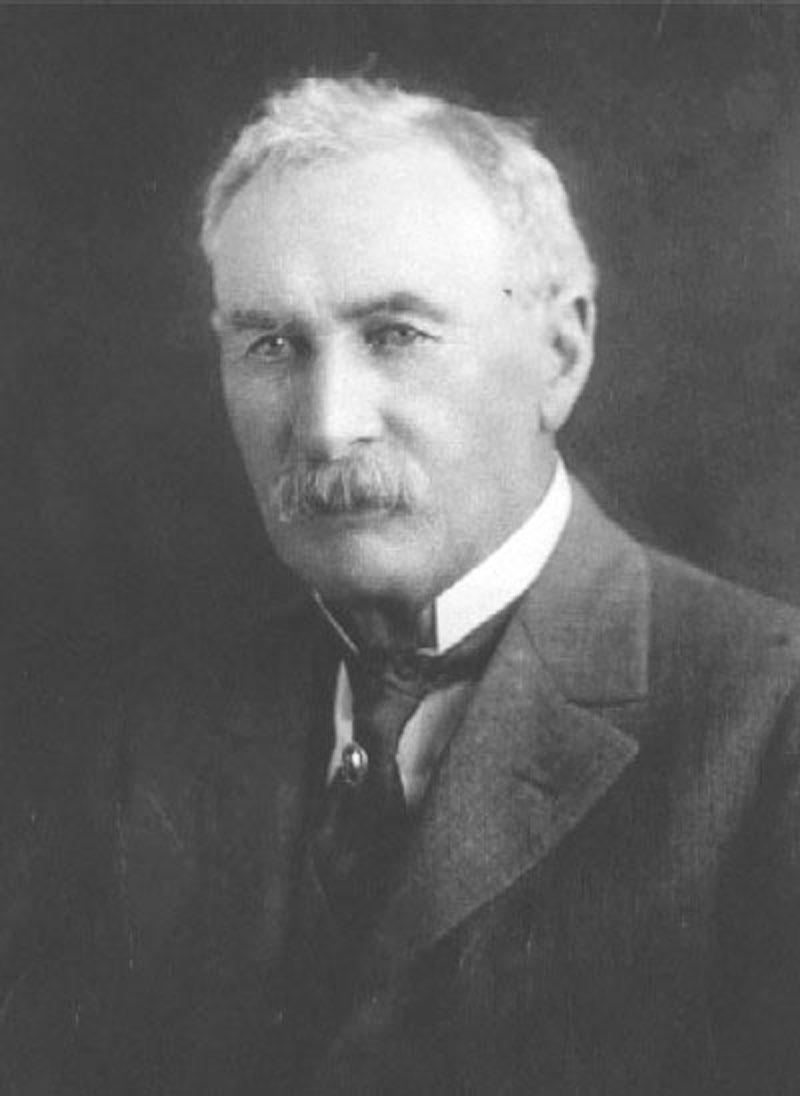
- Mulholland in 1924
- Born: William Mulholland; September 11, 1855; Belfast, Ireland
- Died: July 22, 1935 (aged 79); Los Angeles, California, US
- Resting place: Forest Lawn Memorial Park Cemetery, Glendale, California
- Citizenship: British/Irish, American
- Education: O'Connell school
- Occupation: Civil engineer
- Years active: 1878–1929
- Employer: Bureau of Water Works and Supply
- Known for: Building the water system of Los Angeles
- Successor: Harvey Van Norman
- Spouse: Lillie Ferguson (m. 1890)

William Mulholland (September 11, 1855 – July 22, 1935) was an Irish American self-taught civil engineer who was responsible for building the infrastructure to provide a water supply that allowed Los Angeles to grow into the largest city in California. As the head of a predecessor to the Los Angeles Department of Water and Power, Mulholland designed and supervised the building of the Los Angeles Aqueduct, a 233-mile-long (375 km) system to move water from Owens Valley to the San Fernando Valley. The creation and operation of the aqueduct led to the disputes known as the California water wars. In March 1928, Mulholland's career came to an end when the St. Francis Dam failed just over 12 hours after he and his assistant gave it a safety inspection.

== Early life ==
William Mulholland was born in Belfast, Ireland, part of the United Kingdom. His parents Hugh and Ellen Mulholland were Dubliners and they returned to the city a few years after William's birth. His younger brother, Hugh Jr., was born in 1856. At the time of Mulholland's birth, his father was working as a guard for the Royal Mail. In 1862, when William was seven years old, his mother died. Three years later, his father remarried. William was educated at O'Connell School by the Christian Brothers in Dublin. After having been beaten by his father for receiving bad marks in school, Mulholland ran off to sea.

At 15, Mulholland was a member of the British Merchant Navy. He spent the next four years as a seaman on Gleniffer, making at least 19 Atlantic crossings to ports in North America and the Caribbean. In 1874, he disembarked in New York City and headed west to Michigan, where he worked a summer on a Great Lakes freighter and the winter in a lumber camp.

After nearly losing a leg in a logging accident, he moved to Ohio, where he worked as a handyman. Mulholland reconnected with his brother Hugh, and in December 1876, they stowed away on a ship in New York bound for California. They were discovered in Panama, and were forced to leave the ship. They then walked over 47 miles through jungle to Balboa. Mulholland arrived in Los Angeles in 1877.

== Initial career in Los Angeles ==
After arriving in Los Angeles, which at the time had a population of about 9,000, Mulholland quickly decided to return to life at sea, as work was hard to find. On his way to the port at San Pedro to find a ship, he accepted a job digging a well. After a brief stint in Arizona, where he prospected for gold and worked on the Colorado River, he obtained a job from Frederick Eaton as Deputy Zanjero (water distributor) with the newly formed Los Angeles City Water Company (LACWC). In Alta California during the Spanish and Mexican administrations, water was delivered to Pueblo de Los Angeles in a large, open ditch, the Zanja Madre. The man who tended the ditch was known as a zanjero.

In 1880, Mulholland oversaw the laying of the first iron water pipeline in Los Angeles. Mulholland left the employment of the LACWC briefly in 1884, but returned in mid-December. He left again in 1885 and worked for the Sespe Land and Water Company. As part of his compensation, he was granted 20 acres on Sespe Creek. In 1886, he returned to the LACWC, and in October became a naturalized American citizen. At the end of the year, he was made the superintendent of the LACWC. In 1898, the Los Angeles city government decided not to renew the contract with the LACWC.

Four years later, the Los Angeles Water Department was established with Mulholland as its superintendent. In 1911, the department was renamed the Bureau of Water Works and Supply, with Mulholland named as its chief engineer. In 1937, two years after Mulholland's death, the Bureau of Water Works and Supply merged with the Bureau of Power and Light to form the Los Angeles Department of Water and Power; the agency continues to control, supply, and maintain all the city's domestic services.

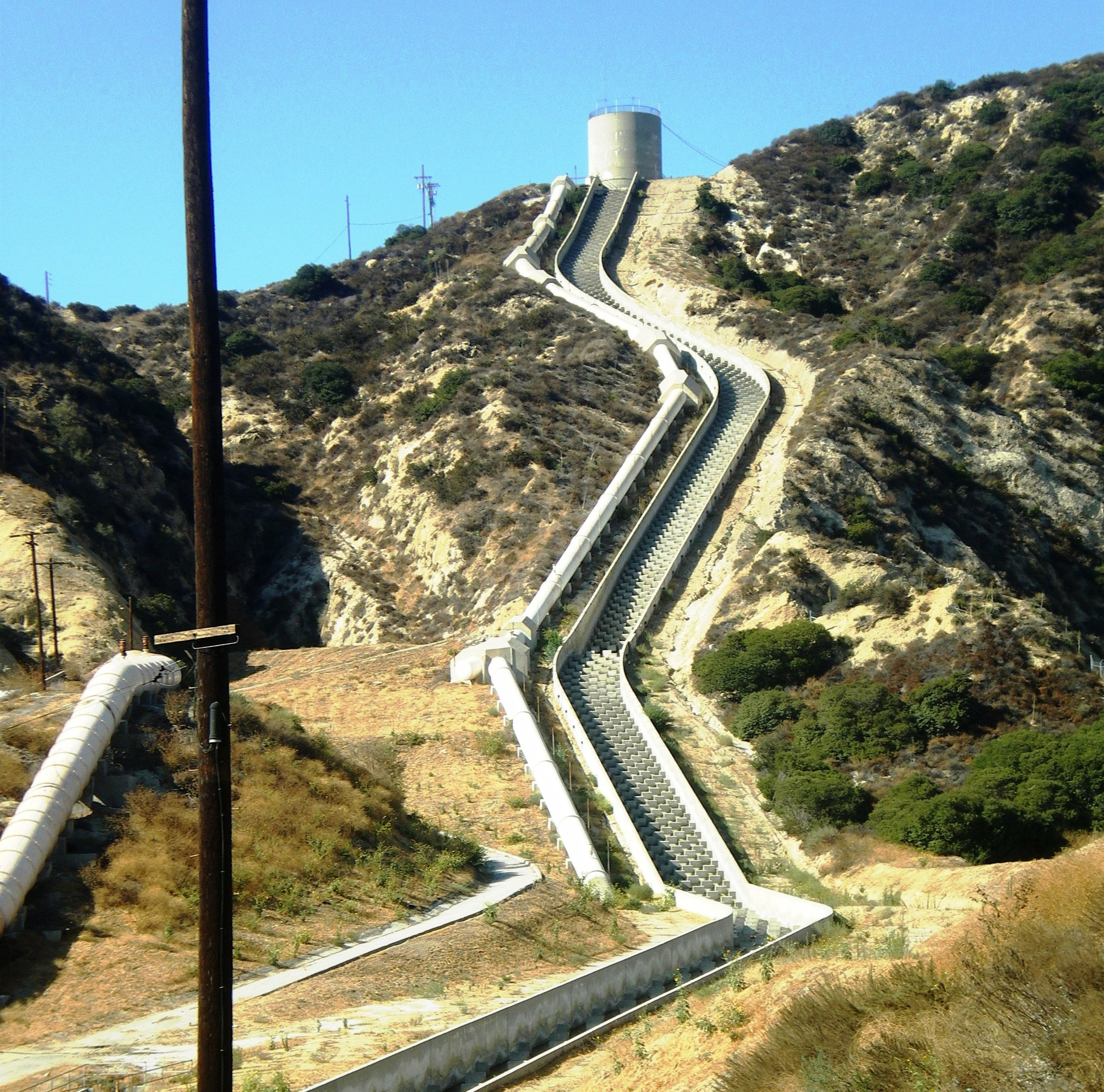
The second Los Angeles Aqueduct Cascades near Sylmar, Los Angeles

== Los Angeles Aqueduct ==
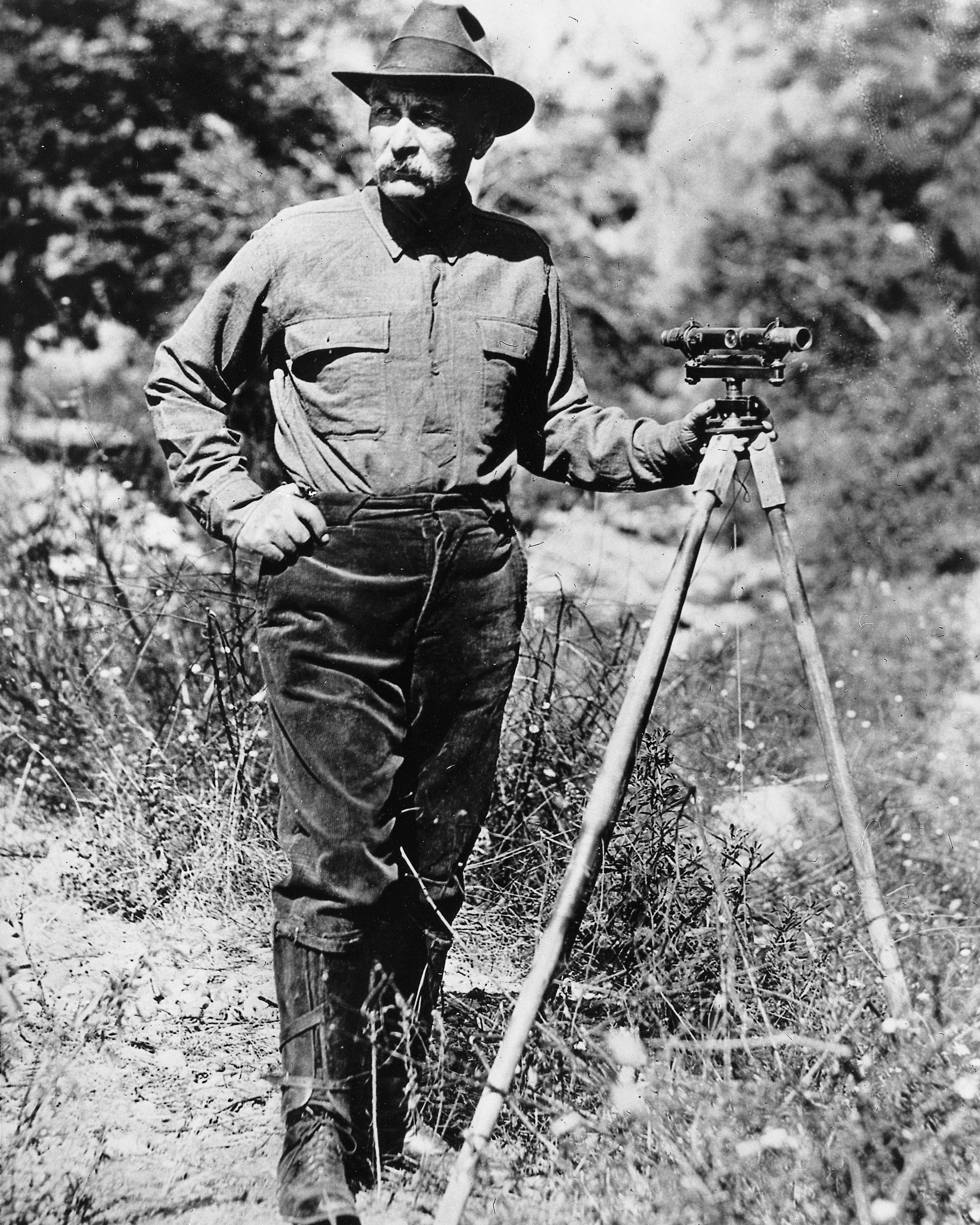
Portrait of William Mulholland with a surveyor's level, c. 1908-1913

Mulholland envisioned Los Angeles growing much larger. The limiting factor to its growth was its water supply, because it has a semiarid climate with unreliable rainfall. "If you don't get the water, you won't need it," Mulholland famously remarked.

Mulholland shared the vision of a much larger Los Angeles with Frederick Eaton, the mayor of Los Angeles from 1898 through 1900. They had worked together in the private Los Angeles Water Company in the 1880s. In 1886, Eaton became city engineer and Mulholland became superintendent of the water company. When Eaton was elected mayor of Los Angeles, he was instrumental in converting the water company to city control in 1902.

When the company became the Los Angeles Water Department, Mulholland continued to be superintendent, due to his vast knowledge of the water system. Expansion rapidly followed as Mulholland's public-works program began to irrigate large areas of previously arid land. Within a decade, the city's population had doubled from just 50,000 in 1890 to more than 100,000 in 1900. Ten years later it had tripled to almost 320,000.

To create this expansion, Eaton and Mulholland realized that the large amount of runoff from the Sierra Nevada in Owens Valley could be delivered to Los Angeles through a gravity-fed aqueduct.

From 1902 to 1905, Eaton, Mulholland, and others engaged in underhanded methods to ensure that Los Angeles would gain the water rights in the Owens Valley, blocking the Bureau of Reclamation from building water infrastructure for the residents in Owens Valley. While Eaton engaged in most of the political maneuverings and chicanery, Mulholland misled Los Angeles public opinion by dramatically understating the amount of water then available for Los Angeles' growth. Mulholland also misled residents of the Owens Valley; he indicated that Los Angeles would only use unused flows in the Owens Valley, while planning on using the full water rights to fill the aquifer of the San Fernando Valley.

In 1906, the Los Angeles Board of Water Commissioners appointed Mulholland the chief engineer of the Bureau of the Los Angeles Aqueduct. From 1907 to 1913, Mulholland directed the building of the aqueduct. The 233-mile (375 km) Los Angeles Aqueduct, inaugurated in November 1913, required 3900 workers at its peak and involved the digging of 164 tunnels. Construction began in 1908. The complexity of the project has been compared to the building of the Panama Canal. Water from the Owens River reached a reservoir in the San Fernando Valley on November 5, 1913. At a ceremony that day, Mulholland spoke his famous words about this engineering feat: "There it is. Take it."

The aqueduct carries water from the Owens Valley in the Eastern Sierra to irrigate and store water in the San Fernando Valley. When the aqueduct was built, the San Fernando Valley was not part of the city. From a hydrological point of view, the San Fernando Valley was ideal; its aquifer could serve as free water storage without evaporation. One obstacle to the irrigation was the Los Angeles City Charter, which prohibited the sale, lease, or other use of the city's water without a two-thirds approval by the voters. This charter limitation was avoided through the annexation of a large portion of the San Fernando Valley to the city.

Mulholland realised that the annexation would raise the debt limit of Los Angeles, which allowed the financing of the aqueduct. By 1915, the initial annexations were completed, and by 1926, the land area of Los Angeles had doubled, making it the largest city in the United States by area. Areas that opted to join the municipal water network were Owensmouth (Canoga Park) (1917), Laurel Canyon (1923), Lankershim (1923), Sunland (1926), La Tuna Canyon (1926), and the incorporated city of Tujunga (1932). The historical relationship between water and the rapid urbanization and growth of Los Angeles is the basis for the fictional plot of the 1974 film Chinatown.

The water from Mulholland's aqueduct also shifted farming from wheat to irrigated crops such as corn, beans, squash, and cotton; orchards of apricots, persimmons, and walnuts; and major citrus groves of oranges and lemons. These continued within the city environs until the next increment of development converted land use into suburbanization. A few enclaves remain, such as the groves at the Orcutt Ranch Park and CSUN campus.

== Professional recognition ==
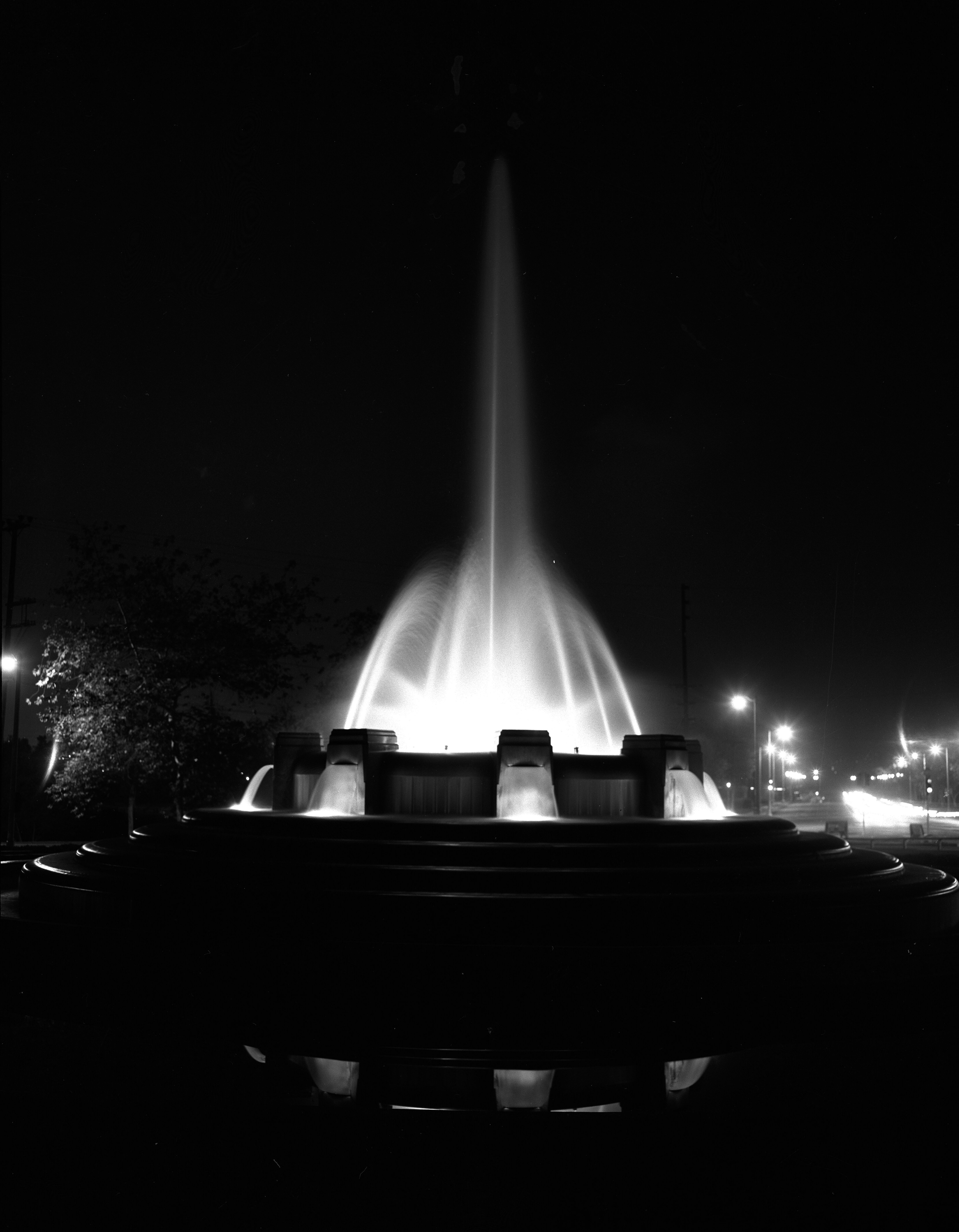
William Mulholland Memorial Fountain in the Los Feliz neighborhood of Los Angeles, on the site where Mulholland once lived

Mulholland, who was self-taught, became the first American civil engineer to use hydraulic sluicing to build a dam while constructing the Silver Lake Reservoir in 1906. This new method attracted nationwide attention of engineers and dam builders. Government engineers adopted the method when building Gatun Dam, on which Mulholland was a consultant, in the Panama Canal Zone.

In 1914, the University of California, Berkeley, awarded Mulholland an honorary doctoral degree. The inscription on the diploma read, "Percussit saxa et duxit flumina ad terram sitientum" (He broke the rocks and brought the river to the thirsty land). Mulholland's public profile continued to grow. His offices were, at one point, on the top floor of Sid Grauman's Million Dollar Theater. He was even a favorite to become mayor of Los Angeles. When asked if he was considering running for office, he replied, "I'd rather give birth to a porcupine backward".

== Calaveras Dam ==
In May 1913, the Spring Valley Water Company (SVWC), which owned the water supply of San Francisco, authorized an executive committee to approve plans and direct construction of the original dam to create Calaveras Reservoir; the committee was also authorized to hire Mulholland as a consultant. That October, with construction of the dam underway, San Francisco's city engineer, Michael O'Shaughnessy, wrote negatively of Mulholland in a letter to John R. Freeman, an engineer who had assisted the city in its pursuit of permission to construct the Hetch Hetchy reservoir and water system in Yosemite National Park. O'Shaughnessy expressed the view that Mulholland and F. C. Hermann, chief engineer for the SVWC, were "so intensely conceited that they imagine all they might do should be immune from criticism."

Indicating construction details or practices that he thought incorrect, O'Shaughnessy wrote of what was, in his view, sloppiness and recklessness at the Calaveras dam site; he said, "another feature which made objectionable impressions" on him was "the flippant manner in which the young college boys in charge of the work and Mulholland, with his swollen ideas of accomplishment, have undertaken this very serious engineering project."

On March 24, 1918, the dam suffered a partial collapse of the upstream slope. At the time, the water in the reservoir was 55 feet deep; no water was released.

== Owens Valley conflict ==
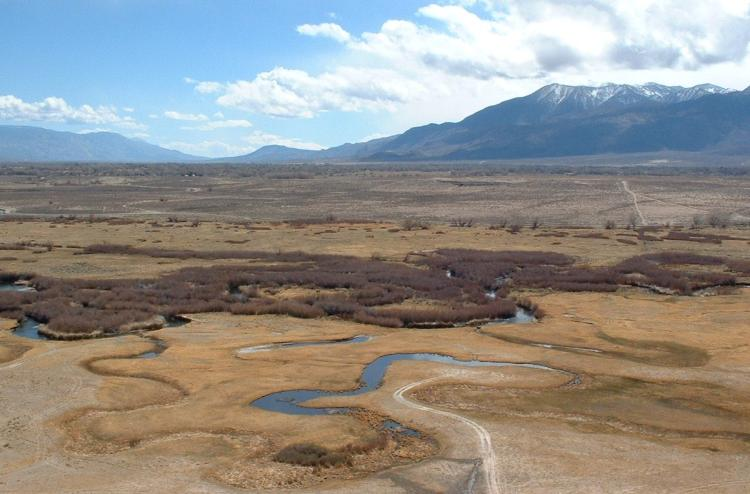
The remains of Owens River at Bishop Tuff: In 1913, the watercourse was diverted for irrigation and drinking water in Los Angeles.

After the Los Angeles Aqueduct was completed, the San Fernando investors demanded so much water from the Owens Valley that it started to transform from "the Switzerland of California" into a desert. Mulholland was blocked from obtaining additional water from the Colorado River, so decided to take all available water from the Owens Valley. By exploiting personal bitterness of some of the Owens Valley farmers, Los Angeles managed to acquire some key water rights. After these water rights were secured, inflows to Owens Lake were heavily diverted, which caused the lake to dry up by 1924.

By 1924, farmers and ranchers rebelled. A series of provocations by Mulholland was, in turn, followed by corresponding threats from local farmers, and the destruction of Los Angeles property. Finally, a group of armed ranchers seized the Alabama Gates and dynamited the aqueduct at Jawbone Canyon, letting water return to the Owens River.

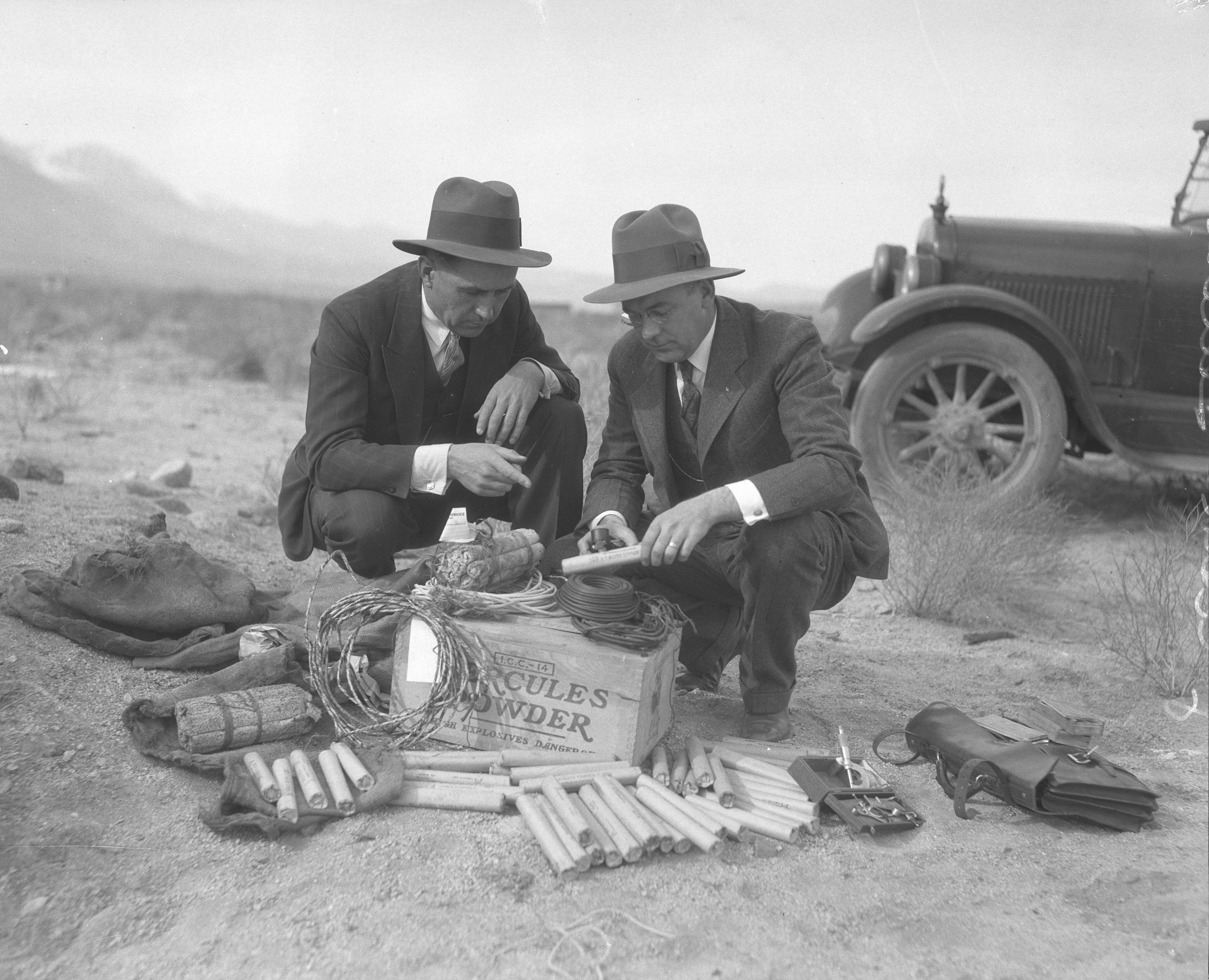
Dynamite found during sabotage incidents of Owens Valley Aqueduct, circa 1924

Additional acts of violence against the aqueduct continued through the year, culminating in a major showdown when opponents seized a key part of the aqueduct, and for four days, completely shut off the water to Los Angeles. The state and local authorities declined to take any action, and the press portrayed the Owens Valley farmers and ranchers as underdogs. Eventually, Mulholland and the city administration were forced to negotiate. Mulholland was quoted as saying, in anger, he "half-regretted the demise of so many of the valley's orchard trees, because now there were no longer enough trees to hang all the troublemakers who live there".

In 1927, when the conflict over the water was at its height, the Inyo County Bank collapsed, due to embezzlement. The economy of Owens Valley collapsed, and the attacks ceased. The city of Los Angeles sponsored a series of repair and maintenance programs for aqueduct facilities, that stimulated some local employment and the Los Angeles water employees were paid a month in advance to bring some relief.

== St. Francis Dam collapse ==
Mulholland's career effectively ended on March 12, 1928, when the St. Francis Dam failed 12 hours after his assistant, assistant chief engineer and general manager Harvey Van Norman and he had personally inspected the site. Within seconds after the collapse, only what had been a large section of the central part of the dam remained standing and the reservoir's 12.4 billion gallons (47 million m^{3}) of water began moving down San Francisquito Canyon in a 140-foot-high (43 m) torrent at 18 miles per hour (29 km/h). In the canyon, it demolished the heavy concrete Powerhouse Number Two (a hydroelectric power plant) and took the lives of 64 of the 67 workmen and their families living there.

The waters traveled south and emptied into the Santa Clara riverbed, flooding parts of present-day Valencia and Newhall. Following the riverbed, the water continued west, flooding the towns of Castaic Junction, Piru, Fillmore, Bardsdale and Santa Paula in Ventura County. It was almost two miles (3 km) wide, and still traveling at 5 miles (8 km) per hour when it reached the ocean at 5:30 am; emptying its victims and debris into the Pacific Ocean near Montalvo, 54 miles (87 km) from the reservoir and dam site. Many of the bodies that had been washed out to sea were recovered from the sea, some as far south as the Mexican border; others were never found.

Santa Paula received some of the worst damage, especially the lowland areas nearer the riverbed. Here, in many areas, only foundations or rubble marked where many homes had been. Rescue efforts were hampered and walking was made hazardous by a thick layer of mud that covered the area.

Recovery crews worked for days to dig out bodies and clear away the mud from the flood's path. The final death toll is estimated to be at least 431, of whom at least 108 were minors.

Mulholland took full responsibility for what has been called the worst US man-made disaster of the 20th century and retired in November 1928. During the Los Angeles coroner's inquest, Mulholland said, "this inquest is very painful for me to have to attend, but it is the occasion of what is painful. The only ones I envy about this whole thing are the ones who are dead." In later testimony, after responding to a question, he added, "Whether it is good or bad, don't blame anyone else, you just fasten it on me. If there was an error in human judgment, I was the human, I won't try to fasten it on anyone else."

The inquest jury concluded that responsibility for the disaster lay in an error in engineering judgment about the suitability of the area's geology as a stable foundation for the dam, and in errors in public policy. They recommended that Mulholland not be held criminally responsible, as they stated in their verdict, "We, the Jury, find no evidence of act of criminal act or intent on the part of the Board of Water Works and Supply of the City of Los Angeles, or any engineer or employee in the construction or operation of the St. Francis Dam..."

Nonetheless, his critics pointed out that another dam on which Mulholland had acted as a consultant collapsed, and the city abandoned a dam project in San Gabriel before completion. Mulholland had increased the height of the dam by 20 feet (6.1 m) after construction had started, without specifying a corresponding increase in the width of the base.

== Later life and death ==
Mulholland spent the rest of his life in relative seclusion, devastated by the tragedy. In retirement, he began writing an autobiography, but never completed it. Shortly before his death, he was consulted on the Hoover Dam and Colorado River Aqueduct projects. He died in 1935 from a stroke, and is buried at Forest Lawn Memorial Park Cemetery in Glendale, California.

== Legacy ==
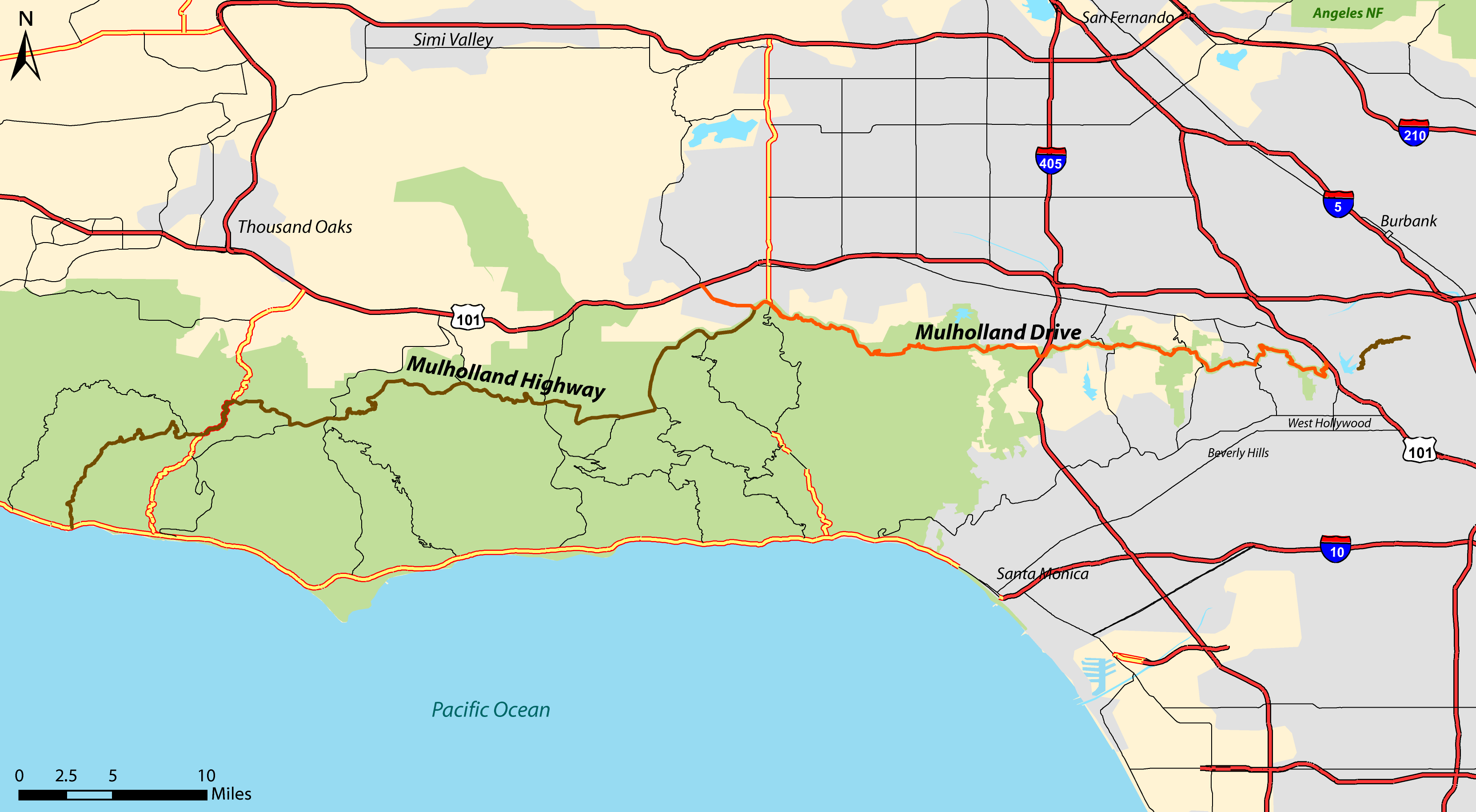
Mulholland Drive (orange) and Mulholland Highway (brown) within Los Angeles County

Aerial view of Mulholland Drive, Los Angeles

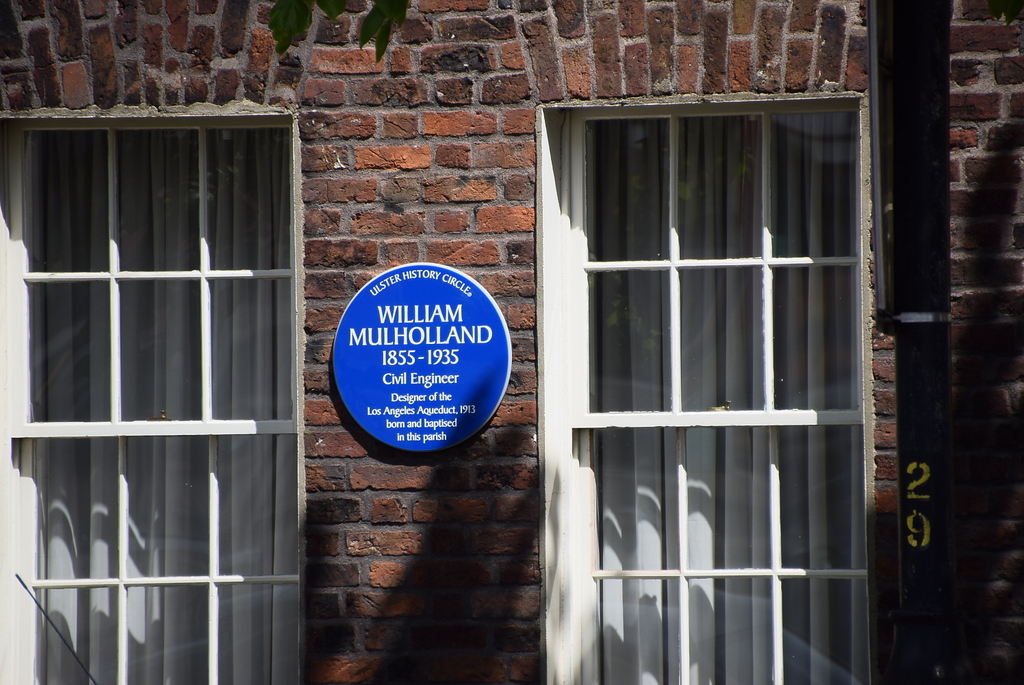
Plaque for William Mulholland, Belfast, Ireland

In his book Water and Power, historian William L. Kahrl summed up Mulholland's public legacy to the principle of public water development in writing:

The harshest judgement of Mulholland's actions lay in the damage he had done to the principle of public water development. More than any other individual, William Mulholland, through the building of the aqueduct and the formation of the Metropolitan Water District, established the principle of public ownership of water indelibly on California's history. But the furor that followed upon the mistakes made in the last seven years of his public service discredited the man and thereby gave aid to the enemies of the ideal he had labored all his life to establish.

In Los Angeles, Mulholland Dam in the Hollywood Hills, Mulholland Drive, Mulholland Highway and Mullholland Middle School are named for Mulholland.

== In popular culture ==
- Singer/songwriter Frank Black recorded two songs about the life and works of William Mulholland: "Olé Mulholland", from Teenager of the Year (1994) and "St. Francis Dam Disaster", from Dog in the Sand (2001).
- William Mullholland and the California water wars are the subject of the BBC Northern Ireland television documentary Patrick Kielty's Mulholland Drive. The program was broadcast in the UK in February 2016 and presented by Irish comedian and television personality Patrick Kielty.
- In the 1974 film Chinatown, the character of Hollis Mulwray is based loosely on Mulholland.
- Mulholland was portrayed by Jack Black in an episode of Comedy Central's Drunk History that parodied his legacy.

== See also ==
- History of Los Angeles
- History of the San Fernando Valley to 1915
