= Mono Lake Committee =

US non-profit organization

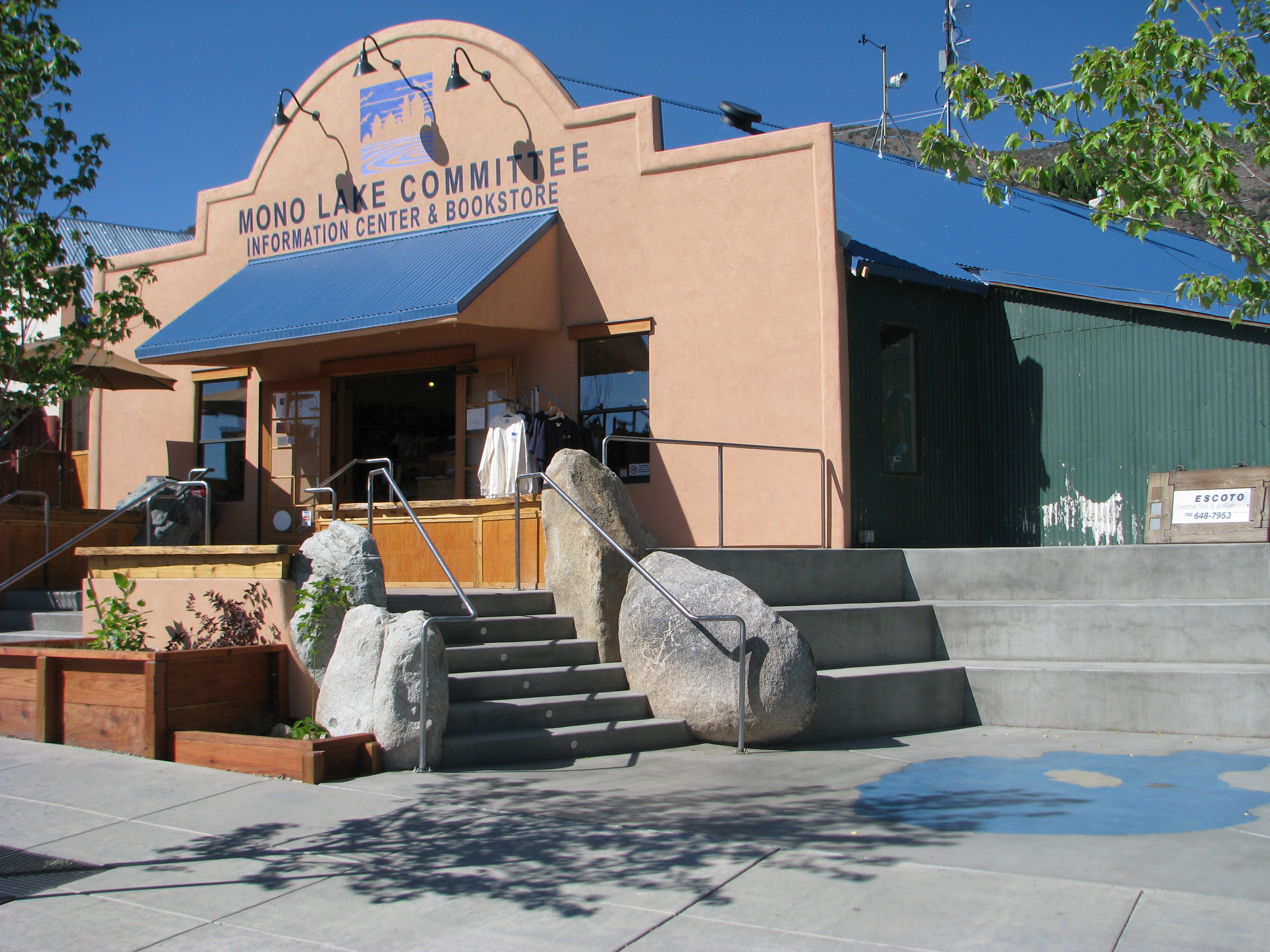
The Mono Lake Committee storefront, August 2013

The Mono Lake Committee (MLC) is an environmental organization based in Lee Vining, California, in the United States. Its mission is to preserve Mono Lake, by reducing diversions of water from the Eastern Sierra watersheds by the Los Angeles Department of Water and Power (LADWP).

== Mono Lake ==
Mono Lake is an alkaline lake east of Yosemite National Park, largely fed by streams from the Sierra Nevada; it has no natural outlet. In 1919 the level of the lake peaked at 6427' above sea level. Birds bred and nested on a few volcanic islands in the lake, sustained by the extensive brine shrimp and alkali flies, which also attracted large numbers of migratory birds.

In 1941, the LADWP began redirecting water from the streams feeding Mono Lake into the Los Angeles Aqueduct. As time passed, this both reduced the level of the lake and dried out the lower sections of the source streams. By 1981 the level of the lake had been reduced to 6372' above sea level, with the lake's volume cut in half, and its salinity doubled. Negit Island, a breeding site for birds, developed a land bridge and became susceptible to land-based predators such as coyotes.

== Formation of the Mono Lake Committee ==
In 1975, David Winkler, Jefferson Burch, and Christine Weigen obtained a grant from the NSF, with help and encouragement from ecologist David Gaines, to study the ecology of Mono Lake. Gaines had found that, starting in 1941, LADWP's diversions of water from Mono Lake's inflow creeks had caused it to lose half its volume and double its salinity. These changes, Gaines reported, reduced the ability of the lake to support its saline ecosystem. During 1976–1977, Gaines witnessed the lake's water level drop even further, and he determined to take action.

The committee was founded in March 1978 by Gaines, David Winkler, Sally Judy and Mark Ross. Gray Brechin became the committee's first director; he joined Gaines and others in lobbying California politicians

Mono Lake is an important habitat for migratory birds (including the California gull). The lowering of the water level endangered the bird nesting grounds on Negit Island in the middle of the lake: a land bridge had formed, which allowed predators to attack the bird nests.

== LADWP Lawsuit ==
In 1979, the MLC, along with the Audubon Society filed suit in Mono County, California Superior Court, claiming that LADWP's water diversions violated the public trust doctrine: that all navigable water must be managed for the benefit of everyone. In 1983, MLC won the argument in front of the California Supreme Court, who directed that the public trust doctrine overrides prior water rights.

Bruce Dodge, of Morrison and Foerster, served as the pro-bono attorney in the case.

Eventually, multiple litigations were adjudicated in 1994, by the California State Water Resources Control Board. In that ruling, LADWP was required to let enough water into Mono Lake to raise the lake level 17.4 feet (5.3 m) above the then-current level of 42.4 feet (12.9 m) below the 1941 level. As of 2018, the water level in Mono Lake has risen 7.3 feet (2.2 m) of the required 17.4 feet (5.3 m). Los Angeles made up for the lost water through state-funded conservation and recycling projects.

== Current Status and Activities ==
The Mono Lake Committee currently monitors the status of the lake and the compliance of the LADWP with the court decision, supports scientific research in the Mono Lake region, and is actively working on restoring the incoming stream environments. They also provide extensive educational activities to schools and the general public, and maintain an office, information center, and bookstore in Lee Vining, CA that also serves as the Lee Vining Chamber of Commerce.

== See also ==
- Water resources
- Water reuse in California
