= David Gaines (environmentalist) =

American environmentalist

David Allen Gaines (December 30, 1947 – January 11, 1988) was an American environmentalist and the founder of the Mono Lake Committee. The Mono Lake Committee (along with the Audubon Society) initiated a lawsuit against the Los Angeles Department of Water and Power to reduce or stop the water diversions that were lowering Mono Lake; Gaines' approach in the lawsuit was to work with the opposition instead of demonizing them. He and his wife, Sally Gaines, began the committee in 1978. They required help from students at Stanford University, UC Davis, UC Santa Cruz, and Earlham College. Based on research in the Mono Basin, Gaines co-wrote a chapter in the book California Riparian Systems. This helped bring scientific attention to the issues at Mono Lake. As a collaborative team, The Mono Lake Committee took a stand against LADWP.

On January 11, 1988, less than two weeks after his 40th birthday, Gaines died in a car accident during a snowstorm on Highway 395 at the base of Crestview Summit, approximately halfway between Mono Lake and Mammoth Lakes. Sally and his two children, Vireo and Sage, survived the accident.
