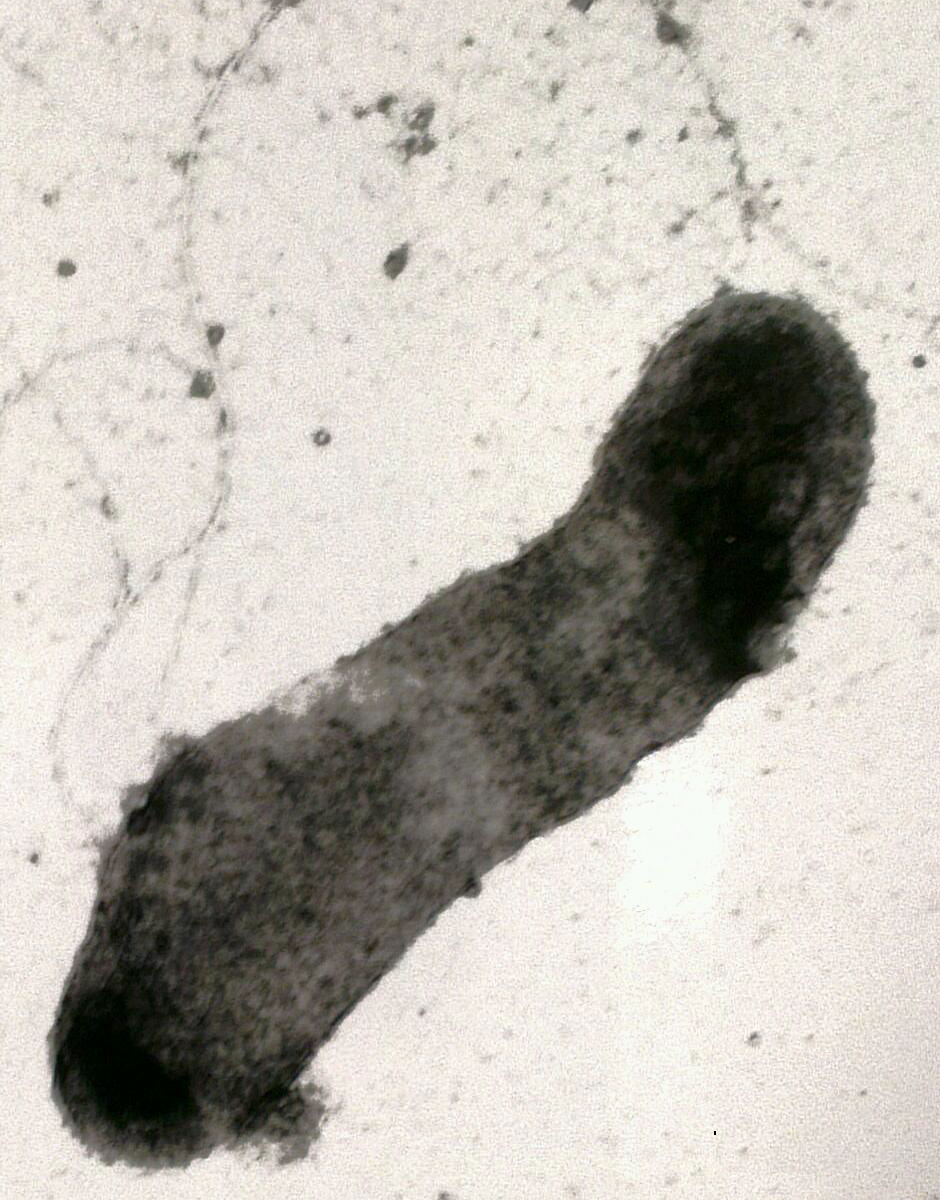

Scientific classification
- Domain: Bacteria
- Kingdom: Pseudomonadati
- Phylum: Pseudomonadota
- Class: Gammaproteobacteria
- Order: Alteromonadales
- Family: Idiomarinaceae
- Genus: Aliidiomarina
- Species: A. minuta

Binomial name
- Aliidiomarina minuta Farooqui et al. 2016

Type strain
- JCM 17425, KCTC 23357, MLST1

= Aliidiomarina minuta =

Species of bacterium

Aliidiomarina minuta is a halophilic, alkaliphilic, aerobic and motile bacterium from the genus of Aliidiomarina which was first isolated from water from the Mono Lake from the United States. Under adverse environmental conditions, A. marina shrinks to around 0.2 μm * 0.1 μm in size as a survival mechanism. This characteristic is unique to other species within the genus and gives A. marina the ability to pass through 0.22 μm filters (commonly used in filter sterilisation).
