= Idiomarina indica =

Scientific classification
- Domain: Bacteria
- Kingdom: Pseudomonadati
- Phylum: Pseudomonadota
- Class: Gammaproteobacteria
- Order: Alteromonadales
- Family: Idiomarinaceae
- Genus: Idiomarina
- Species: I. indica

Binomial name
- Idiomarina indica Song et al. 2013

Type strain
- CGMCC 1.10824, SW104, X07, JCM 18138

Species of bacterium

Idiomarina indica is a Gram-negative, aerobic and rod-shaped bacterium from the genus Idiomarina which has been isolated from seawater from the Indian Ocean.
