= Idiomarina atlantica =

Scientific classification
- Domain: Bacteria
- Kingdom: Pseudomonadati
- Phylum: Pseudomonadota
- Class: Gammaproteobacteria
- Order: Alteromonadales
- Family: Idiomarinaceae
- Genus: Idiomarina
- Species: I. atlantica

Binomial name
- Idiomarina atlantica Du et al. 2015

Type strain
- KCTC 42141, MCCC 1A10513, G5_TVMV8_7

Species of bacterium

Idiomarina atlantica is a Gram-negative, aerobic, slightly curved rod-shaped and non-motile bacterium from the genus Idiomarina which has been isolated from sediments from Atlantic Ocean.
