= Idiomarina fontislapidosi =

Scientific classification
- Domain: Bacteria
- Kingdom: Pseudomonadati
- Phylum: Pseudomonadota
- Class: Gammaproteobacteria
- Order: Alteromonadales
- Family: Idiomarinaceae
- Genus: Idiomarina
- Species: I. fontislapidosi

Binomial name
- Idiomarina fontislapidosi Martínez-Cánovas et al. 2004

Type strain
- CECT 5859, CIP 108573, DSM 16139, F23, LMG 22169

Synonyms
- Idiomarina mucosa

Species of bacterium

Idiomarina fontislapidosi is a Gram-negative, strictly aerobic, chemoorganotrophic and motile bacterium from the genus Idiomarina which has been isolated from soil from Fuente de Piedra in Spain.
