= Idiomarina piscisalsi =

Scientific classification
- Domain: Bacteria
- Kingdom: Pseudomonadati
- Phylum: Pseudomonadota
- Class: Gammaproteobacteria
- Order: Alteromonadales
- Family: Idiomarinaceae
- Genus: Idiomarina
- Species: I. piscisalsi

Binomial name
- Idiomarina piscisalsi Sitdhipol et al. 2014

Type strain
- NBRC 108617, TISTR 2054, TPS4-2

Species of bacterium

Idiomarina piscisalsi is a bacterium from the genus Idiomarina which has been isolated from Pla ra from Thailand.
