= Maqsudul Alam =

Bangladeshi scientist (1954–2014)

- Born: 14 December 1954; Madaripur (Faridpur), Bangladesh
- Died: 20 December 2014 (aged 60); Hawaii, United States
- Resting place: Hawaii General Park, U.S.
- Education: Dhaka College; Moscow State University; Max Planck Institute of Biochemistry
- Known for: Genome sequencing of papaya, rubber, and jute
- Scientific career
- Institutions: University of Hawaiʻi at Mānoa

Maqsudul Alam (Bengali: মাকসুদুল আলম; 14 December 1954 – 20 December 2014) was an East Bengal-born life-science scientist who is known for his work on genome sequencing. His work on genome sequencing started with bacteria Idiomarina loihiensis in 2003. He came into the focus of Bangladeshi people after his work on genome sequencing of jute species and jute attacking fungus.

== Early life ==
Alam was born in Madaripur, Faridpur, East Pakistan. His parents were Dalil Uddin Ahmed, a martyr of the 1971 Liberation War and an official of East Pakistan Rifles; and Lyrian Ahmed, a teacher, and social worker.

== Personal life ==
Alam married Irina Anatolievna during his stay in Russia. Alam was a Ph.D. student and Anatolievna was a medical student at that time. The couple had one daughter named Liliana Maqsudulovna Alam (1986-2019). In 1992, the family moved to United States. The couple was divorced in 1997. Alam later married Rafia Hasina in 2009.

== Education ==
Alam completed secondary and higher secondary education from Government Laboratory High School and Dhaka College, respectively. He completed his master's degree in microbiology from Moscow State University in 1979; and earned his first Ph.D. degree in microbiology from the same university in 1982. He earned his second Ph.D. in biochemistry from Max Planck Institute of Biochemistry in 1987.

== Academic career ==
From 1988 to 1990, Alam was a senior research scientist at Institute of Bioorganic Chemistry of Russian Academy of Sciences. Then he was a visiting scientist of department of Biochemistry and Biophysics at Washington State University from 1990 to 1992. Alam was an assistant director of Marine Bioproducts Engineering Center (MarBEC) at University of Hawaiʻi.

In 1992, Alam joined the department of Microbiology at University of Hawaiʻi at Mānoa as an assistant professor. In 1997, he was promoted to associate professor. Alam became full professor in 2001, a position which he held until his death. He was also the Director of Advanced Studies in Genomics, Proteomics and Bioinformatics at University of Hawaii, Manoa from 2003 until his death.

Alam was the director of Centre for Chemical Biology at Universiti Sains Malaysia from 2009 to 2012. In 2011, Alam became a member of advisory board at Shahjalal University of Science and Technology (SUST), Sylhet.

== Scientific career ==
In 2003, Alam set up the Advanced Studies in Genomics, Proteomics and Bioinformatics (ASGPB) at the University of Hawaiʻi at Manoa. Consolidating the DNA sequencing framework of ASGPB with the bioinformatic assets at the Maui High Performance Computing Center (MHPCC), he ran a Computational Proteomics program that ranged from wet lab research to in silico informatics. Alam and his team completed the genome sequencing of Idiomarina loihiensis, an ancient organism found in the hydrothermal vents of Kamaʻehuakanaloa (formerly Loihi) during a University of Hawaiʻi expedition in 2003.

In 2007, Alam worked in the Hawaii Papaya Genome Project which aimed to sequence the complete genome of the transgenic 'SunUp' papaya. The SunUp papaya was genetically modified to confer resistance to the Papaya ringspot virus, but Hawaiian farmers could not sell the transgenic papaya in Japan; Alam and his team sequenced the transgenic papaya to help the farmers get through the regulatory process.

Alam set up the Center for Chemical Biology at Universiti Sains Malaysia in 2009. There he established research facilities, research programs, and worked on genome sequencing of rubber tree (Hevea brasiliensis).

=== Bangladesh Jute Genome Project ===
In 2009, Alam joined the Basic and Applied Research on Jute Project of Jute Research Institute, Bangladesh, as principal investigator. He hoped genome sequencing of a cash crop like jute would help Bangladesh economically because jute can be made disease resistant if the genome sequence is known. Alam's team worked on genome sequencing of tossa jute (Corchorus olitorius O4) and in 2010, Prime Minister Sheikh Hasina publicly announced that jute genome had been decoded and several patent applications would be filed. Alam's team went on to work on sequencing a jute attacking fungus (Macrophomina phaseolina) in 2012 and white jute (Corchorus capsularis CVL1) in 2013.

== Death ==
On 20 December 2014, Alam died at the Queen's medical center, Honolulu, Hawaii. He was suffering from cirrhosis of the liver. On 23 December 2014, he was buried at Hawaii Memorial Park Cemetery as per his desire.

== Awards ==
Alam was awarded excellence of research award from University of Hawaiʻi in 2001, NIH Shannon Award in 1997, Humboldt Research Fellow in 1987 from German Science Foundation. In 2016, Alam was awarded Independence Day Award posthumously by the Government of Bangladesh.

"Maqsudul Alam Graduate Research Award Fund" was created by University of Hawaii Foundation to support the education of graduate students and to honor Alam.

== Publications ==
=== Book chapters ===
- Synteny and Collinearity in Plant Genomes (2008).
- Protoglobin and globin-coupled sensors (2008).
