= Idiomarina halophila =

Scientific classification
- Domain: Bacteria
- Kingdom: Pseudomonadati
- Phylum: Pseudomonadota
- Class: Gammaproteobacteria
- Order: Alteromonadales
- Family: Idiomarinaceae
- Genus: Idiomarina
- Species: I. halophila

Binomial name
- Idiomarina halophila Lee et al. 2015

Type strain
- KACC 17610, NCAIM B 02544, BH195

Species of bacterium

Idiomarina halophila is a Gram-negative, strictly aerobic, halophilic and non-motile bacterium from the genus Idiomarina which has been isolated from sediment from a solar saltern from Gomso in Korea.
