= Idiomarina seosinensis =

Scientific classification
- Domain: Bacteria
- Kingdom: Pseudomonadati
- Phylum: Pseudomonadota
- Class: Gammaproteobacteria
- Order: Alteromonadales
- Family: Idiomarinaceae
- Genus: Idiomarina
- Species: I. seosinensis

Binomial name
- Idiomarina seosinensis Choi and Cho 2005

Type strain
- JCM 12526, KCTC 12296, CL-SP19

Species of bacterium

Idiomarina seosinensis is a halophilic and motile bacterium from the genus Idiomarina which has been isolated from hypersaline water from a solar saltern from Seosin in Korea.
