= Idiomarina xiamenensis =

Scientific classification
- Domain: Bacteria
- Kingdom: Pseudomonadati
- Phylum: Pseudomonadota
- Class: Gammaproteobacteria
- Order: Alteromonadales
- Family: Idiomarinaceae
- Genus: Idiomarina
- Species: I. xiamenensis

Binomial name
- Idiomarina xiamenensis Wang et al. 2011

Type strain
- 10-D-4, CCTCC AB 209061, LMG 25227, MCCC 1A01370

Species of bacterium

Idiomarina xiamenensis is a bacterium from the genus Idiomarina which has been isolated from seawater from the Xiamen Island in China.
