= Idiomarina donghaiensis =

Scientific classification
- Domain: Bacteria
- Kingdom: Pseudomonadati
- Phylum: Pseudomonadota
- Class: Gammaproteobacteria
- Order: Alteromonadales
- Family: Idiomarinaceae
- Genus: Idiomarina
- Species: I. donghaiensis

Binomial name
- Idiomarina donghaiensis (Wu et al. 2009) Taborda et al. 2010

Type strain
- CGMCC 1.7284, JCM 15533

Synonyms
- Pseudidiomarina donghaiensis

Species of bacterium

Idiomarina donghaiensis is a Gram-negative, aerobic, rod-shaped and motile bacterium from the genus Idiomarina which has been isolated from seawater from the East China Sea.
