= Aliidiomarina iranensis =

Scientific classification
- Domain: Bacteria
- Kingdom: Pseudomonadati
- Phylum: Pseudomonadota
- Class: Gammaproteobacteria
- Order: Alteromonadales
- Family: Idiomarinaceae
- Genus: Aliidiomarina
- Species: A. iranensis

Binomial name
- Aliidiomarina iranensis Ali Amoozegar et al. 2016

Type strain
- CECT 8339, IBRC-M 10763, GBPy7

Species of bacterium

Aliidiomarina iranensis is a Gram-negative, slightly halophilic, alkaliphilic, straight rod-shaped and motile bacterium from the genus of Aliidiomarina which has been isolated from wetland from Gomishan in Iran.
