= Aliidiomarina soli =

Scientific classification
- Domain: Bacteria
- Kingdom: Pseudomonadati
- Phylum: Pseudomonadota
- Class: Gammaproteobacteria
- Order: Alteromonadales
- Family: Idiomarinaceae
- Genus: Aliidiomarina
- Species: A. soli

Binomial name
- Aliidiomarina soli Xu et al. 2017

Type strain
- CGMCC 1.15759, KCTC 52381, Y4G10-17

Species of bacterium

Aliidiomarina soli is a Gram-negative, non-spore-forming and motile bacterium from the genus of Aliidiomarina which has been isolated from saline-alkaline soil from the Inner Mongolia in China.
