= Aliidiomarina sedimenti =

Scientific classification
- Domain: Bacteria
- Kingdom: Pseudomonadati
- Phylum: Pseudomonadota
- Class: Gammaproteobacteria
- Order: Alteromonadales
- Family: Idiomarinaceae
- Genus: Aliidiomarina
- Species: A. sedimenti

Binomial name
- Aliidiomarina sedimenti Shahinpei et al. 2017

Type strain
- CECT 8340, IBRC-M 10764, GBSy1

Species of bacterium

Aliidiomarina sedimenti is a Gram-negative, moderately halophilic, alkaliphilic and motile bacterium from the genus of Aliidiomarina which has been isolated from wetland of Gomishan in Iran.
