= Idiomarina woesei =

Scientific classification
- Domain: Bacteria
- Kingdom: Pseudomonadati
- Phylum: Pseudomonadota
- Class: Gammaproteobacteria
- Order: Alteromonadales
- Family: Idiomarinaceae
- Genus: Idiomarina
- Species: I. woesei

Binomial name
- Idiomarina woesei Poddar et al. 2015

Type strain
- DSM 27808, W11, JCM 19499, LMG 27903

Species of bacterium

Idiomarina woesei is a Gram-negative and heterotrophic bacterium from the genus Idiomarina which has been isolated from seawater from the Andaman Sea in India.
