= Idiomarina aestuarii =

Scientific classification
- Domain: Bacteria
- Kingdom: Pseudomonadati
- Phylum: Pseudomonadota
- Class: Gammaproteobacteria
- Order: Alteromonadales
- Family: Idiomarinaceae
- Genus: Idiomarina
- Species: I. aestuarii

Binomial name
- Idiomarina aestuarii (Park et al. 2010) Wang et al. 2011

Type strain
- JCM 16344, KCTC 22740

Synonyms
- Pseudidiomarina aestuarii

Species of bacterium

Idiomarina aestuarii is a Gram-negative, rod-shaped, aerobic and non-motile bacterium from the genus Idiomarina which has been isolated from seawater from the South Sea in Korea.
