= Aliidiomarina shirensis =

Scientific classification
- Domain: Bacteria
- Kingdom: Pseudomonadati
- Phylum: Pseudomonadota
- Class: Gammaproteobacteria
- Order: Alteromonadales
- Family: Idiomarinaceae
- Genus: Aliidiomarina
- Species: A. shirensis

Binomial name
- Aliidiomarina shirensis Chiu et al. 2014

Type strain
- BCRC 80327, JCM 17761, AIS

Species of bacterium

Aliidiomarina shirensis is a Gram-negative, aerobic, heterotrophic and halophilic bacterium from the genus of Aliidiomarina which has been isolated from water from the Shira Lake in Khakassia.
