= Idiomarina tyrosinivorans =

Scientific classification
- Domain: Bacteria
- Kingdom: Pseudomonadati
- Phylum: Pseudomonadota
- Class: Gammaproteobacteria
- Order: Alteromonadales
- Family: Idiomarinaceae
- Genus: Idiomarina
- Species: I. tyrosinivorans

Binomial name
- Idiomarina tyrosinivorans Hameed et al. 2016

Type strain
- BCRC 80745, CC-PW-9, JCM 19757

Species of bacterium

Idiomarina tyrosinivorans is a Gram-negative, strictly aerobic, non-spore-forming, curved-rod-shaped, tyrosine-metabolizing and motile bacterium from the genus Idiomarina which has been isolated from water off the river Pingtung in Taiwan.
