= Idiomarina aquatica =

Scientific classification
- Domain: Bacteria
- Kingdom: Pseudomonadati
- Phylum: Pseudomonadota
- Class: Gammaproteobacteria
- Order: Alteromonadales
- Family: Idiomarinaceae
- Genus: Idiomarina
- Species: I. aquatica

Binomial name
- Idiomarina aquatica Jose Leon et al. 2015

Type strain
- CCM 8471, CECT 8360, M6-46, M6-48B

Species of bacterium

Idiomarina aquatica is a Gram-negative, moderately halophilic and aerobic bacterium from the genus Idiomarina which has been isolated from a saltern from Huelva in Spain.
