= Aliidiomarina sanyensis =

Scientific classification
- Domain: Bacteria
- Kingdom: Pseudomonadati
- Phylum: Pseudomonadota
- Class: Gammaproteobacteria
- Order: Alteromonadales
- Family: Idiomarinaceae
- Genus: Aliidiomarina
- Species: A. sanyensis

Binomial name
- Aliidiomarina sanyensis Wang et al. 2017

Type strain
- GYP-17, KCTC 32218, LMG 27471

Species of bacterium

Aliidiomarina sanyensis is a Gram-negative, aerobic, non-spore-forming, hexabromocyclododecane-assimilating, rod-shaped and motile bacterium from the genus of Aliidiomarina which has been isolated from a pool of Spirulina platensis from Sanya in China.
