= Aliidiomarina haloalkalitolerans =

Scientific classification
- Domain: Bacteria
- Kingdom: Pseudomonadati
- Phylum: Pseudomonadota
- Class: Gammaproteobacteria
- Order: Alteromonadales
- Family: Idiomarinaceae
- Genus: Aliidiomarina
- Species: A. haloalkalitolerans

Binomial name
- Aliidiomarina haloalkalitolerans Srinivas et al. 2015

Type strain
- JCM 17359, MTCC 11064, AK5

Species of bacterium

Aliidiomarina haloalkalitolerans is a Gram-negative, strictly aerobic, rod shaped, non-spore-forming and motile bacterium from the genus of Aliidiomarina which has been isolated from seawater from the Bay of Bengal in India.
