= Idiomarina =

Scientific classification
- Domain: Bacteria
- Kingdom: Pseudomonadati
- Phylum: Pseudomonadota
- Class: Gammaproteobacteria
- Order: Alteromonadales
- Family: Idiomarinaceae
- Genus: Idiomarina; Ivanova et al. 2000

Species
- See text

Genus of bacteria

Idiomarina is a genus of bacteria in the Gammaproteobacteria class, including the sequenced species Idiomarina loihiensis.

== Species ==
Many species are in this genus, including many not specifically identified:

- I. abyssalis
- I. aestuarii
- I. aquatica
- I. aquimaris
- I. atlantica
- I. baltica
- I. donghaiensis
- I. halophila
- I. fontislapidosi
- I. homiensis
- I. indica
- I. insulisalsae
- I. loihiensis
- I. marina
- I. maris
- I. maritima
- I. piscisalsi
- I. planktonica
- I. ramblicola
- I. salinarum
- I. sediminum
- I. seosinensis
- I. tainanensis
- I. taiwanensis
- I. tyrosinivorans
- I. woesei
- I. xiamenensis
- I. zobellii
