= Idiomarina baltica =

Scientific classification
- Domain: Bacteria
- Kingdom: Pseudomonadati
- Phylum: Pseudomonadota
- Class: Gammaproteobacteria
- Order: Alteromonadales
- Family: Idiomarinaceae
- Genus: Idiomarina
- Species: I. baltica

Binomial name
- Idiomarina baltica Brettar et al. 2003

Type strain
- CIP 107824, DSM 15154, LMG 21691, OS145

Species of bacterium

Idiomarina baltica is a bacterium from the genus Idiomarina which has been isolated from water from the Baltic Sea.
