= Idiomarina insulisalsae =

Scientific classification
- Domain: Bacteria
- Kingdom: Pseudomonadati
- Phylum: Pseudomonadota
- Class: Gammaproteobacteria
- Order: Alteromonadales
- Family: Idiomarinaceae
- Genus: Idiomarina
- Species: I. insulisalsae

Binomial name
- Idiomarina insulisalsae Taborda et al. 2010

Type strain
- CIP 108836, IT-2008, LMG 23123

Species of bacterium

Idiomarina insulisalsae is a Gram-negative, aerobic and halophilic bacterium from the genus Idiomarina which has been isolated from a sea salt evaporation pond from the Island of Sal.
