= Idiomarina planktonica =

Scientific classification
- Domain: Bacteria
- Kingdom: Pseudomonadati
- Phylum: Pseudomonadota
- Class: Gammaproteobacteria
- Order: Alteromonadales
- Family: Idiomarinaceae
- Genus: Idiomarina
- Species: I. planktonica

Binomial name
- Idiomarina planktonica Zhong et al. 2014

Type strain
- CGMCC 1.12458, TS-T11, JCM 19263

Species of bacterium

Idiomarina planktonica is a Gram-negative and non-spore-forming bacterium from the genus Idiomarina which has been isolated from the Tuosu lake in China.
