= California's Dead Sea =

California's dead sea may refer to:

- Mono Lake, in Mono County, California
- Salton Sea, in California's Imperial and Riverside counties
