= Lee Vining Airport =

- IATA: none; ICAO: none; FAA LID: O24

Summary
- Airport type: Public
- Owner: Mono County
- Operator: Mono County Assistant; Director of Public Works
- Location: Lee Vining, California
- Elevation AMSL: 6,802 ft / 2,073 m
- Coordinates: 37°57′28″N 119°06′21″W

Map
- Interactive map of Lee Vining Airport

Runways
Direction	Length		Surface
Direction	ft	m	Surface
15/33	4,090	1,247	Asphalt

Statistics (2008)
- Aircraft operations: 2,000
- Source: Federal Aviation Administration

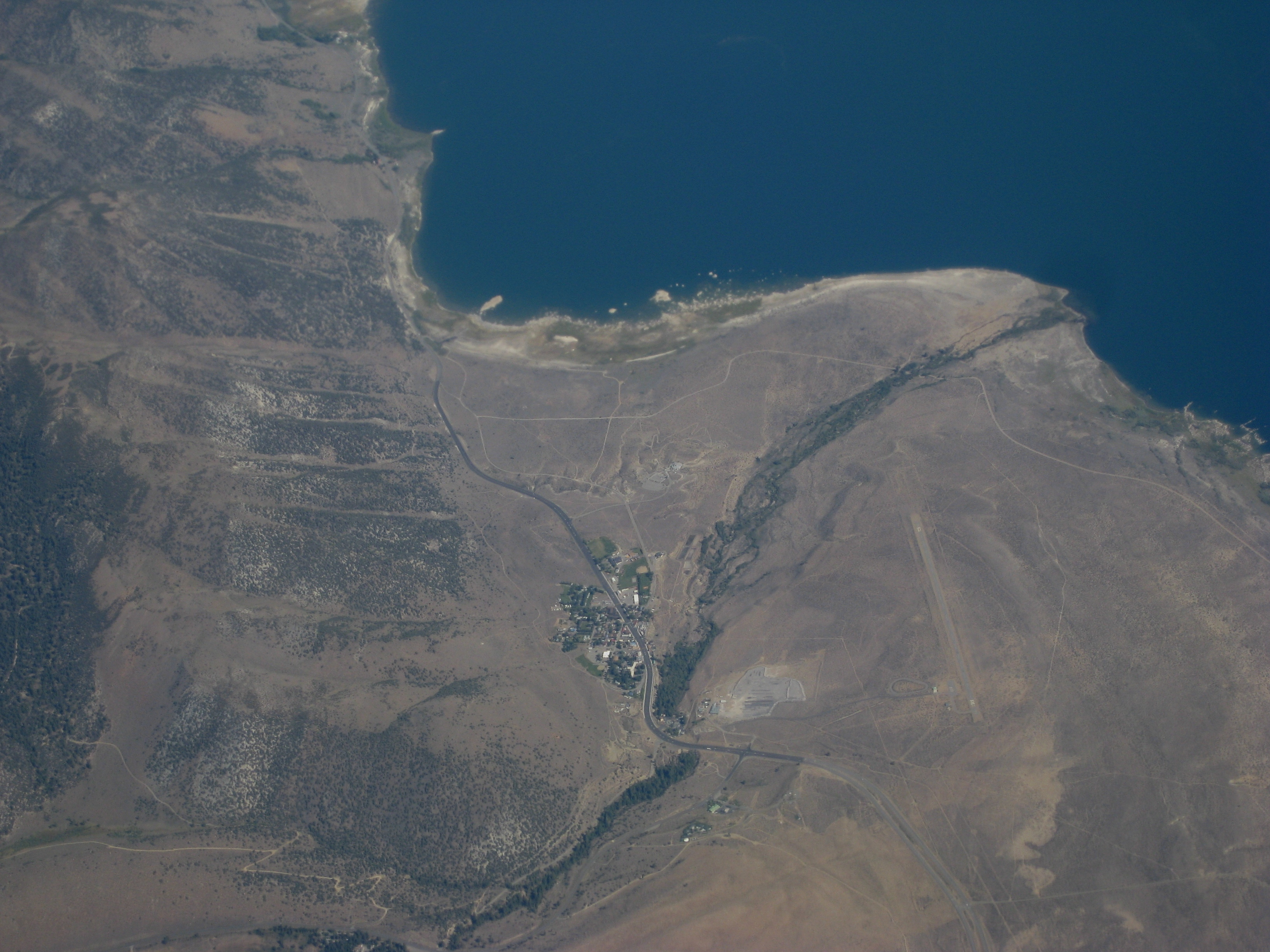
Lee Vining Airport from the air, 2009. Visible are the town, CA-120, Lee Vining Canyon, and part of Mono Lake.

Lee Vining Airport (FAA LID: O24) is a public use airport located one nautical mile (1.8 km) east of the central business district of Lee Vining, a town in Mono County, California, United States. The airport is owned by the City of Los Angeles. It is 0.9 miles (1.4 km) west of Mono Lake, one of the popular destinations in the Mammoth Lakes (Inyo National Forest).

== Facilities and aircraft ==
Lee Vining Airport covers an area of 54 acres (22 ha) at an elevation of 6,802 feet (2,073 m) above mean sea level. It has one asphalt paved runway which measures 4,090 by 50 feet (1,247 x 15 m). The runway is 3,760 feet (1,150 m) long between displaced thresholds. The apron measures 295 by 90 feet (90 x 27 m) and can usually accommodate six GA fixed-wing aircraft, near south end of the landing facility.

For the 12-month period ending October 6, 2008, the airport had 2,000 aircraft operations, an average of 166 per month, all of which were general aviation.

== See also ==
- Mammoth Yosemite Airport (KMMH) (23.7 nm NW)
