= Idiomarina aquimaris =

Scientific classification
- Domain: Bacteria
- Kingdom: Pseudomonadati
- Phylum: Pseudomonadota
- Class: Gammaproteobacteria
- Order: Alteromonadales
- Family: Idiomarinaceae
- Genus: Idiomarina
- Species: I. aquimaris

Binomial name
- Idiomarina aquimaris Chen et al. 2012

Type strain
- BCRC 80083, Chen SW15, LMG 25374, SW15

Species of bacterium

Idiomarina aquimaris is a Gram-negative, aerobic, rod-shaped and motile bacterium from the genus Idiomarina which has been isolated from the coral Isopora palifera from Taiwan.
