= Idiomarina abyssalis =

Scientific classification
- Domain: Bacteria
- Kingdom: Pseudomonadati
- Phylum: Pseudomonadota
- Class: Gammaproteobacteria
- Order: Alteromonadales
- Family: Idiomarinaceae
- Genus: Idiomarina
- Species: I. abyssalis

Binomial name
- Idiomarina abyssalis Ivanova et al. 2000

Type strain
- ATCC BAA-312, CIP 107408, KMM 227, VKM B-2607

Species of bacterium

Idiomarina abyssalis is a Gram-negative, halophilic and aerobic bacterium from the genus Idiomarina which has been isolated from seawater from a depth of 4000 5000 metre from the Pacific Ocean.
