= Idiomarina marina =

Scientific classification
- Domain: Bacteria
- Kingdom: Pseudomonadati
- Phylum: Pseudomonadota
- Class: Gammaproteobacteria
- Order: Alteromonadales
- Family: Idiomarinaceae
- Genus: Idiomarina
- Species: I. marina

Binomial name
- Idiomarina marina (Jean et al. 2009) Taborda et al. 2010

Type strain
- BCRC 17749, JCM 15083

Synonyms
- Pseudidiomarina marina

Species of bacterium

Idiomarina marina is a Gram-negative, aerobic and heterotrophic bacterium from the genus Idiomarina which has been isolated from seawater from the An-Ping Harbour in Taiwan.
