= Aliidiomarina taiwanensis =

Scientific classification
- Domain: Bacteria
- Kingdom: Pseudomonadati
- Phylum: Pseudomonadota
- Class: Gammaproteobacteria
- Order: Alteromonadales
- Family: Idiomarinaceae
- Genus: Aliidiomarina
- Species: A. taiwanensis

Binomial name
- Aliidiomarina taiwanensis Huang et al. 2012

Type strain
- BCRC 80035, JCM 1605, NCCB 100321, AIT1

Species of bacterium

Aliidiomarina taiwanensis is a Gram-negative, aerobic, heterotrophic and motile bacterium from the genus of Aliidiomarina which has been isolated from water from the Bitou Harbour in Taiwan.
