= Lee Vining, California =

- Census-designated place
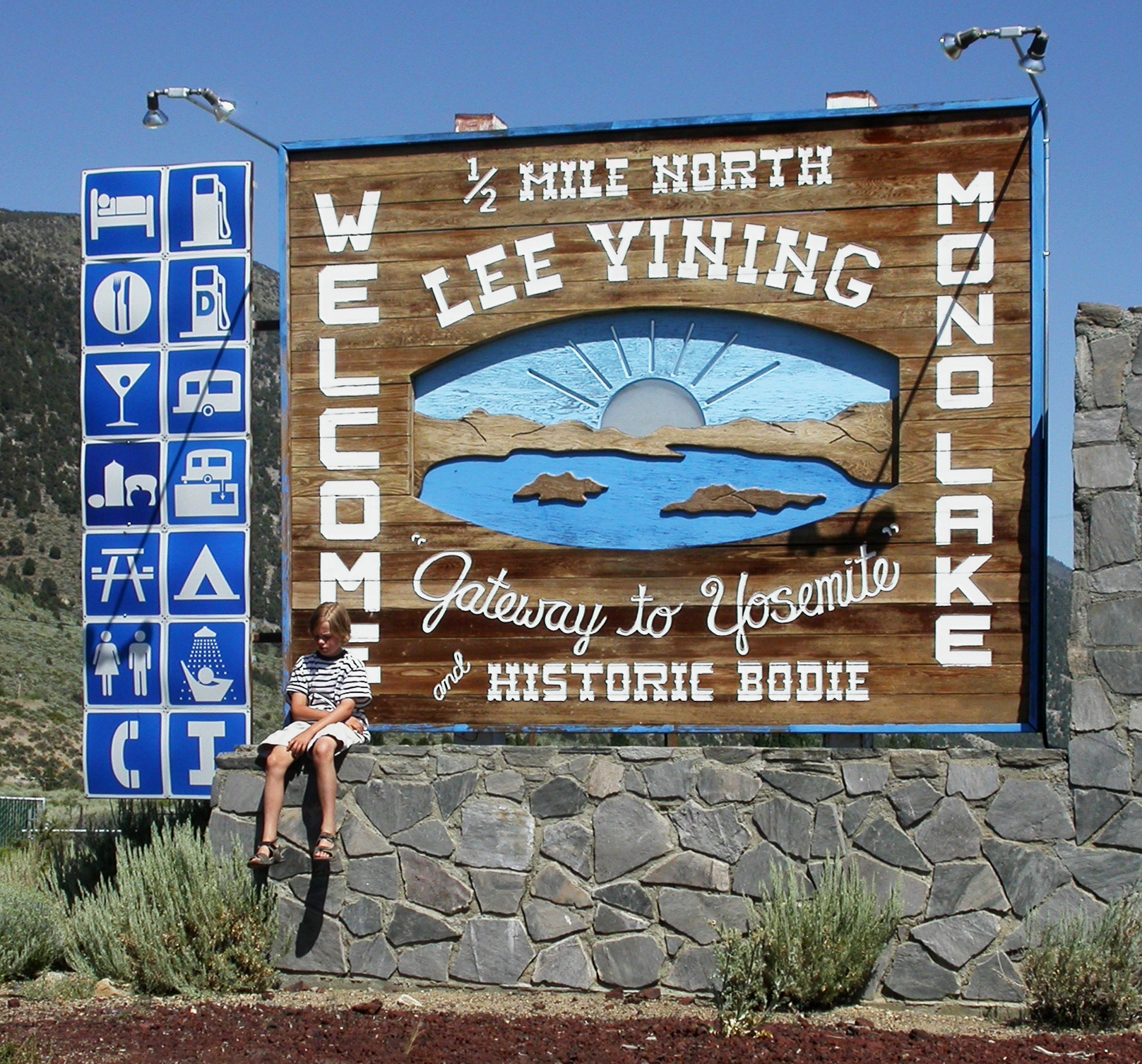
- Welcome to Lee Vining

- Location in Mono County, California

- Location within California Location within the United States
- Coordinates: 37°57′18″N 119°07′42″W
- Country: United States
- State: California
- County: Mono

Area
  - Total: 5.209 sq mi (13.490 km^{2})
  - Land: 5.206 sq mi (13.484 km^{2})
  - Water: 0.0023 sq mi (0.006 km^{2}) 0.05%
- Elevation: 6,874 ft (2,095 m)

Population (2020)
  - Total: 217
  - Density: 42/sq mi (16.1/km^{2})
- Time zone: UTC-8 (Pacific (PST))
  - Summer (DST): UTC-7 (PDT)
- ZIP Code: 93541
- Area codes: 442/760
- GNIS feature IDs: 2583054

Lee Vining (formerly Leevining, Poverty Flat, and Lakeview) is an unincorporated community and census-designated place (CDP) in Mono County, California, United States. It is located 25 miles (40 km) south-southeast of Bridgeport. Lee Vining is located on the southwest shore of Mono Lake. The population was 217 as of the 2020 census.

== History ==
The town was named after Leroy Vining, who founded the town in 1852 as a mining camp. In 1926, the town was laid out by Chris Mattly and named "Lakeview", but when a post office was sought in 1928, it was learned that another town, Lakeview, California, already had the name. The name of Lee Vining was chosen in 1953. The place was also called "Poverty Flat" for its unfavorable conditions for agriculture.

== Geography ==
Lee Vining is in western Mono County along U.S. Route 395, at the eastern base of the Sierra Nevada. US 395 leads northwest 25 miles (40 km) to Bridgeport, the Mono county seat, and southeast the same distance to the junction for Mammoth Lakes. California State Route 120 climbs west from Lee Vining 12 miles (19 km) to the top of Tioga Pass, the east entrance to Yosemite National Park. According to the United States Census Bureau, the Lee Vining CDP covers an area of 5.2 square miles (13 km^{2}), of which 99.95% is land and 0.05% is water.

=== Climate ===
Lee Vining, on the boundary between the Sierra Nevada and Great Basin ecoregions, has a transitional climate: warmer and drier than the mountains to the west but cooler and much snowier than the vast desert to the east. Despite only getting 14 inches (360 mm) of water-equivalent precipitation annually, the town averages nearly 6 feet (1.8 m) of snow, sometimes falling as late as May or even June. Precipitation is highest in the winter months of December through March, but some can be expected to fall every month of the year, and the town does not typically experience the four to six month dry spells of more coastal parts of California.

Climate data for Lee Vining, California, 1991–2020 normals, extremes 1944–present (Note: MONO LAKE 1944−1988, LEE VINING 1988−PRESENT)
| Month | Jan | Feb | Mar | Apr | May | Jun | Jul | Aug | Sep | Oct | Nov | Dec | Year |
|---|---|---|---|---|---|---|---|---|---|---|---|---|---|
| Record high °F (°C) | 66 (19) | 68 (20) | 81 (27) | 81 (27) | 89 (32) | 96 (36) | 97 (36) | 97 (36) | 94 (34) | 85 (29) | 75 (24) | 65 (18) | 97 (36) |
| Mean maximum °F (°C) | 54.1 (12.3) | 56.8 (13.8) | 65.6 (18.7) | 73.9 (23.3) | 80.0 (26.7) | 87.6 (30.9) | 91.2 (32.9) | 89.5 (31.9) | 85.4 (29.7) | 77.4 (25.2) | 66.9 (19.4) | 57.6 (14.2) | 91.8 (33.2) |
| Mean daily maximum °F (°C) | 40.9 (4.9) | 44.1 (6.7) | 51.0 (10.6) | 57.9 (14.4) | 66.2 (19.0) | 76.6 (24.8) | 84.2 (29.0) | 83.0 (28.3) | 76.0 (24.4) | 65.1 (18.4) | 52.9 (11.6) | 42.3 (5.7) | 61.7 (16.5) |
| Daily mean °F (°C) | 30.8 (−0.7) | 33.4 (0.8) | 39.3 (4.1) | 45.2 (7.3) | 52.9 (11.6) | 61.9 (16.6) | 69.0 (20.6) | 67.6 (19.8) | 60.7 (15.9) | 50.5 (10.3) | 40.3 (4.6) | 32.0 (0.0) | 48.6 (9.2) |
| Mean daily minimum °F (°C) | 20.6 (−6.3) | 22.7 (−5.2) | 27.6 (−2.4) | 32.5 (0.3) | 39.6 (4.2) | 47.3 (8.5) | 53.8 (12.1) | 52.3 (11.3) | 45.5 (7.5) | 35.9 (2.2) | 27.8 (−2.3) | 21.7 (−5.7) | 35.6 (2.0) |
| Mean minimum °F (°C) | 8.2 (−13.2) | 9.7 (−12.4) | 15.4 (−9.2) | 20.0 (−6.7) | 27.6 (−2.4) | 34.0 (1.1) | 46.5 (8.1) | 44.9 (7.2) | 35.4 (1.9) | 24.1 (−4.4) | 15.6 (−9.1) | 9.2 (−12.7) | 4.8 (−15.1) |
| Record low °F (°C) | −6 (−21) | −8 (−22) | 1 (−17) | 11 (−12) | 16 (−9) | 25 (−4) | 35 (2) | 32 (0) | 18 (−8) | 8 (−13) | 6 (−14) | −5 (−21) | −8 (−22) |
| Average precipitation inches (mm) | 2.66 (68) | 2.71 (69) | 1.82 (46) | 0.7 (18) | 0.73 (19) | 0.41 (10) | 0.51 (13) | 0.42 (11) | 0.31 (7.9) | 0.83 (21) | 1.44 (37) | 2.56 (65) | 15.10 (384) |
| Average snowfall inches (cm) | 19.0 (48) | 16.1 (41) | 11.6 (29) | 3.3 (8.4) | 1.6 (4.1) | 0.2 (0.51) | 0.0 (0.0) | 0.0 (0.0) | 0.0 (0.0) | 1.4 (3.6) | 4.7 (12) | 11.6 (29) | 69.5 (175.61) |
| Average precipitation days (≥ 0.01 in) | 6.7 | 6.8 | 5.9 | 3.4 | 4.1 | 2.2 | 3.3 | 2.5 | 2.1 | 3.0 | 3.8 | 6.0 | 49.8 |
| Average snowy days (≥ 0.1 in) | 4.8 | 4.9 | 3.6 | 1.8 | 0.5 | 0.1 | 0.0 | 0.0 | 0.0 | 0.5 | 1.9 | 4.5 | 22.6 |
Source 1: NOAA
Source 2: National Weather Service

== Economy ==
The economy of Lee Vining relies largely on tourism, since it is the closest town to the east entrance of Yosemite National Park, and is near other tourist destinations such as Mono Lake, the ghost town of Bodie, popular trout fishing destinations, and June Mountain and Mammoth Mountain ski areas, and the June Lake recreational area. Although off-season tourism has increased in recent years, most tourists visit in the summer months because State Route 120 through Yosemite is often closed otherwise because of heavy snowfall in the winter. Lee Vining has a year-round information center for visitors.

== Sights ==
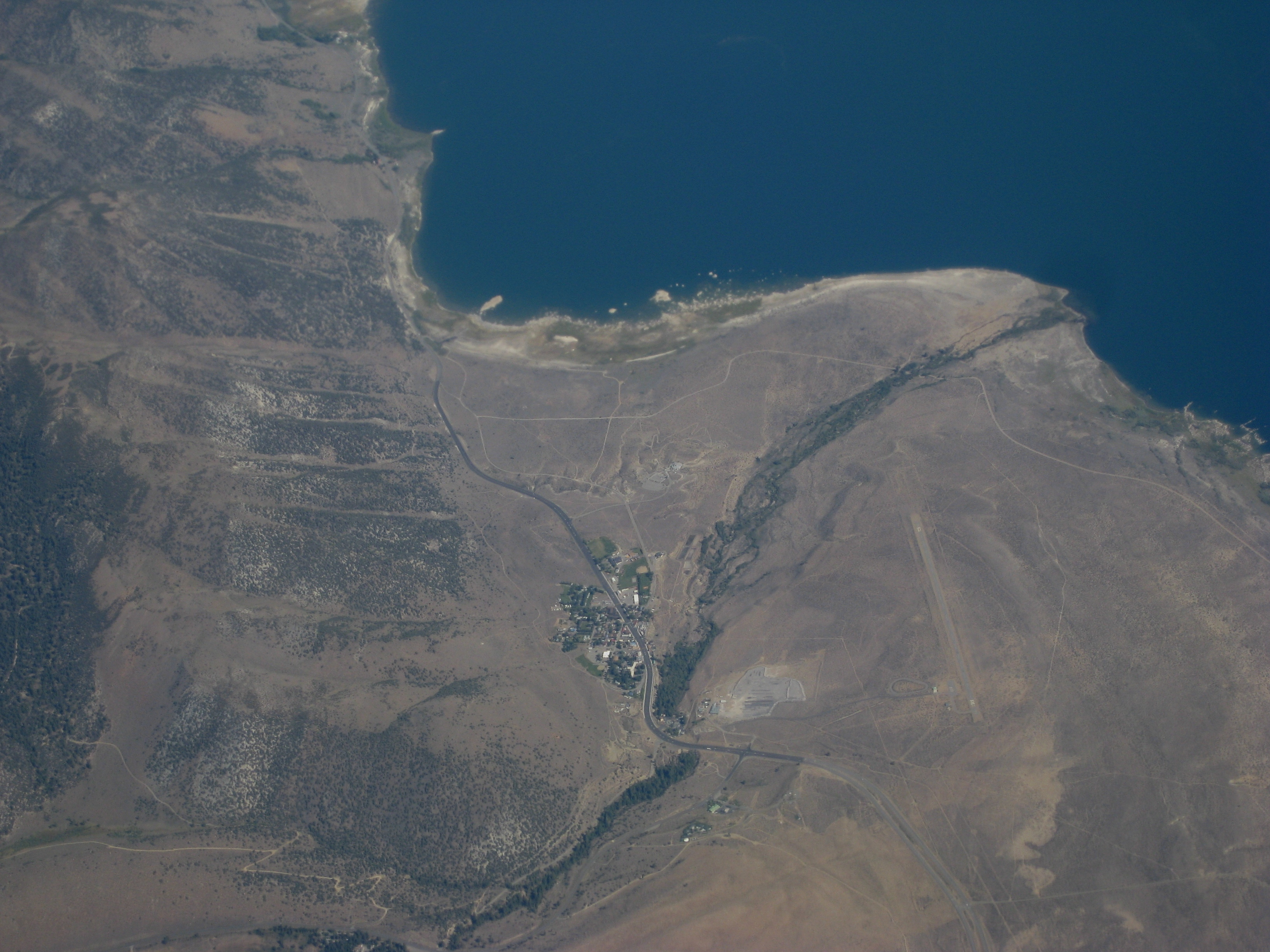
Lee Vining from the air, 2009. Visible are the town, CA-120, Lee Vining Canyon, the local airport, and part of Mono Lake.

Lee Vining is situated near the foot of Lee Vining Canyon. State Route 120 runs from town, through the canyon, up to Tioga Pass. Lee Vining Canyon is one of only two ice climbing venues in California. U.S. Route 395 also runs through the town, connecting to Los Angeles 330 miles (530 km) to the south, and Reno, Nevada 140 miles (230 km) to the north. Gus Hess Park commemorates an early miner in Lee Vining.

The town is the site of the Upside-Down House, a distinctive local landmark built by silent film actress Nellie Bly O'Bryan. Also located in the town is the Whoa Nellie Deli, which was once described by the San Francisco Chronicle as "a misplaced Fellini set carved into the edge of the Mono Basin, dust devils skipping around in the distance like extras on the floor of Owens Valley."

The Lee Vining Airport lies near the town. The ZIP Code is 93541. The community is inside area codes 442 and 760.

== Demographics ==
Historical population
| Census | Pop. | Note | %± |
|---|---|---|---|
| 2010 | 222 | | — |
| 2020 | 217 | | −2.3% |
U.S. Decennial Census; 2000 2010

Lee Vining first appeared as a census designated place in the 2010 U.S. census.

The 2020 United States census reported that Lee Vining had a population of 217. The population density was 41.7 inhabitants per square mile (16.1/km^{2}). The racial makeup of Lee Vining was 104 (47.9%) White, 3 (1.4%) African American, 22 (10.1%) Native American, 0 (0.0%) Asian, 0 (0.0%) Pacific Islander, 35 (16.1%) from other races, and 53 (24.4%) from two or more races. Hispanic or Latino of any race were 109 persons (50.2%).

The census reported that 203 people (93.5% of the population) lived in households, 14 (6.5%) lived in non-institutionalized group quarters, and no one was institutionalized.

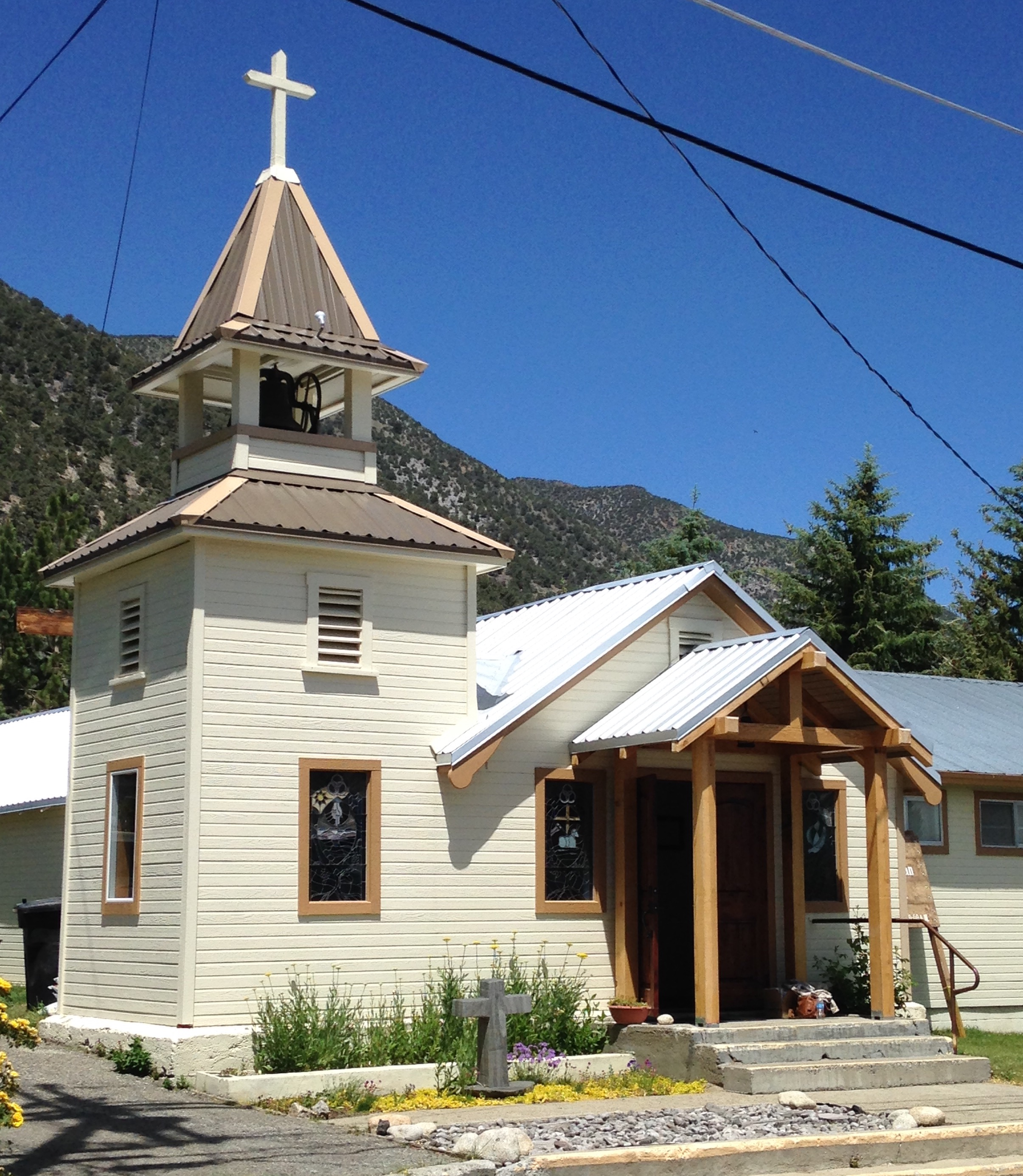
Old Church In Lee Vining, 2015

There were 88 households, out of which 30 (34.1%) had children under the age of 18 living in them, 43 (48.9%) were married-couple households, 8 (9.1%) were cohabiting couple households, 20 (22.7%) had a female householder with no partner present, and 17 (19.3%) had a male householder with no partner present. 33 households (37.5%) were one person, and 15 (17.0%) were one person aged 65 or older. The average household size was 2.31. There were 50 families (56.8% of all households).

The age distribution was 46 people (21.2%) under the age of 18, 17 people (7.8%) aged 18 to 24, 52 people (24.0%) aged 25 to 44, 64 people (29.5%) aged 45 to 64, and 38 people (17.5%) who were 65 years of age or older. The median age was 42.5 years. For every 100 females, there were 88.7 males.

There were 114 housing units at an average density of 21.9 units per square mile (8.5 units/km^{2}), of which 88 (77.2%) were occupied. Of these, 37 (42.0%) were owner-occupied, and 51 (58.0%) were occupied by renters.

== Government ==
In the California State Legislature, Lee Vining is in the 4th senatorial district, represented by Republican Marie Alvarado-Gil, and in the 8th Assembly district, represented by Republican David Tangipa.

In the United States House of Representatives, Lee Vining is in California's 3rd congressional district, represented by Independent Kevin Kiley.

== Education ==
Lee Vining is in the Eastern Sierra Unified School District. An elementary school and a high school (Lee Vining High School) are located in Lee Vining. Lee Vining also has a public library.
