= Aliidiomarina =

Scientific classification
- Domain: Bacteria
- Kingdom: Pseudomonadati
- Phylum: Pseudomonadota
- Class: Gammaproteobacteria
- Order: Alteromonadales
- Family: Idiomarinaceae
- Genus: Aliidiomarina; Huang et al. 2012 emend. Chiu et al. 2014

Species
- A. haloalkalitolerans; A. iranensis; A. maris; A. minuta; A. sanyensis; A. sedimenti; A. shirensis; A. soli; A. taiwanensis

Genus of bacteria

Aliidiomarina is a genus of halophilic bacteria.
