= Idiomarina loihiensis =

Scientific classification
- Domain: Bacteria
- Kingdom: Pseudomonadati
- Phylum: Pseudomonadota
- Class: Gammaproteobacteria
- Order: Alteromonadales
- Family: Idiomarinaceae
- Genus: Idiomarina
- Species: I. loihiensis

Binomial name
- Idiomarina loihiensis Donachie et al., 2003

Species of bacterium

Idiomarina loihiensis is a halophilic bacterium in the genus Idiomarina. It is a rod shaped, gram-negative, aerobic cell with a single polar flagellum. The cells are typically 0.35 μm wide and 0.7–1.8 μm in length with optimum growth temperatures between 4–46 °C. It was isolated from a hydrothermal vent at 1,300m depth on the Kamaʻehuakanaloa (formerly Loihi) submarine volcano, Hawaii.

== Genome ==
The genome has been sequenced and contains 2,839,318 bp, with a GC content of 47.04%, encoding 2640 protein coding genes. These include many enzymes involved in amino acid degradation and transport, leading to the hypothesis that these bacteria utilize protein particles present in their natural habitat. The genome also encodes enzymes for the synthesis of exopolysaccharides that may be used in adherence to these particles.
