= Whoa Nellie Deli =

Casual gourmet restaurant in Lee Vining, California

Coordinates: 37°56′50″N 119°06′48″W

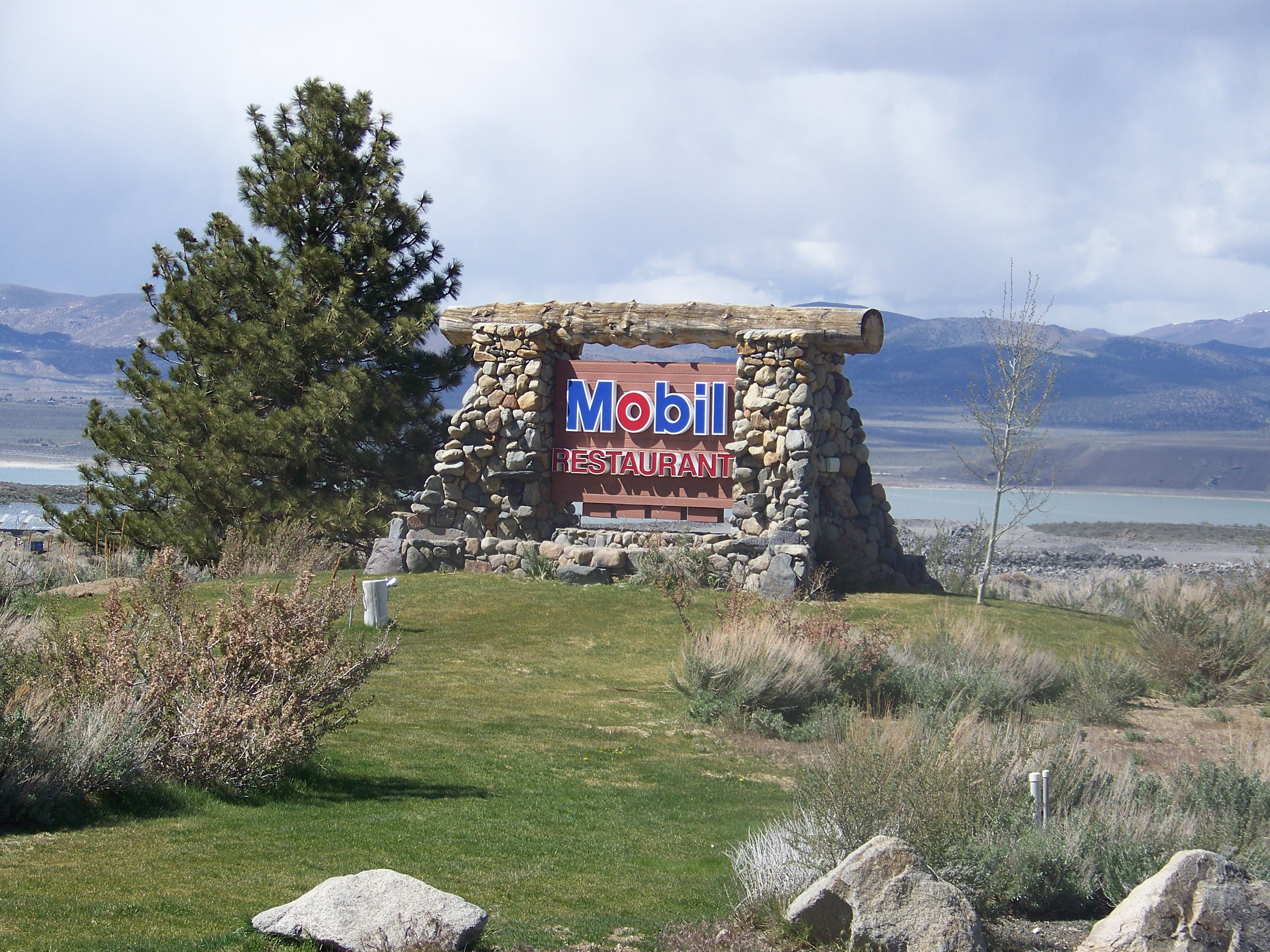
The sign for the Whoa Nellie Deli in Lee Vining, CA. Mono Lake is in the background.

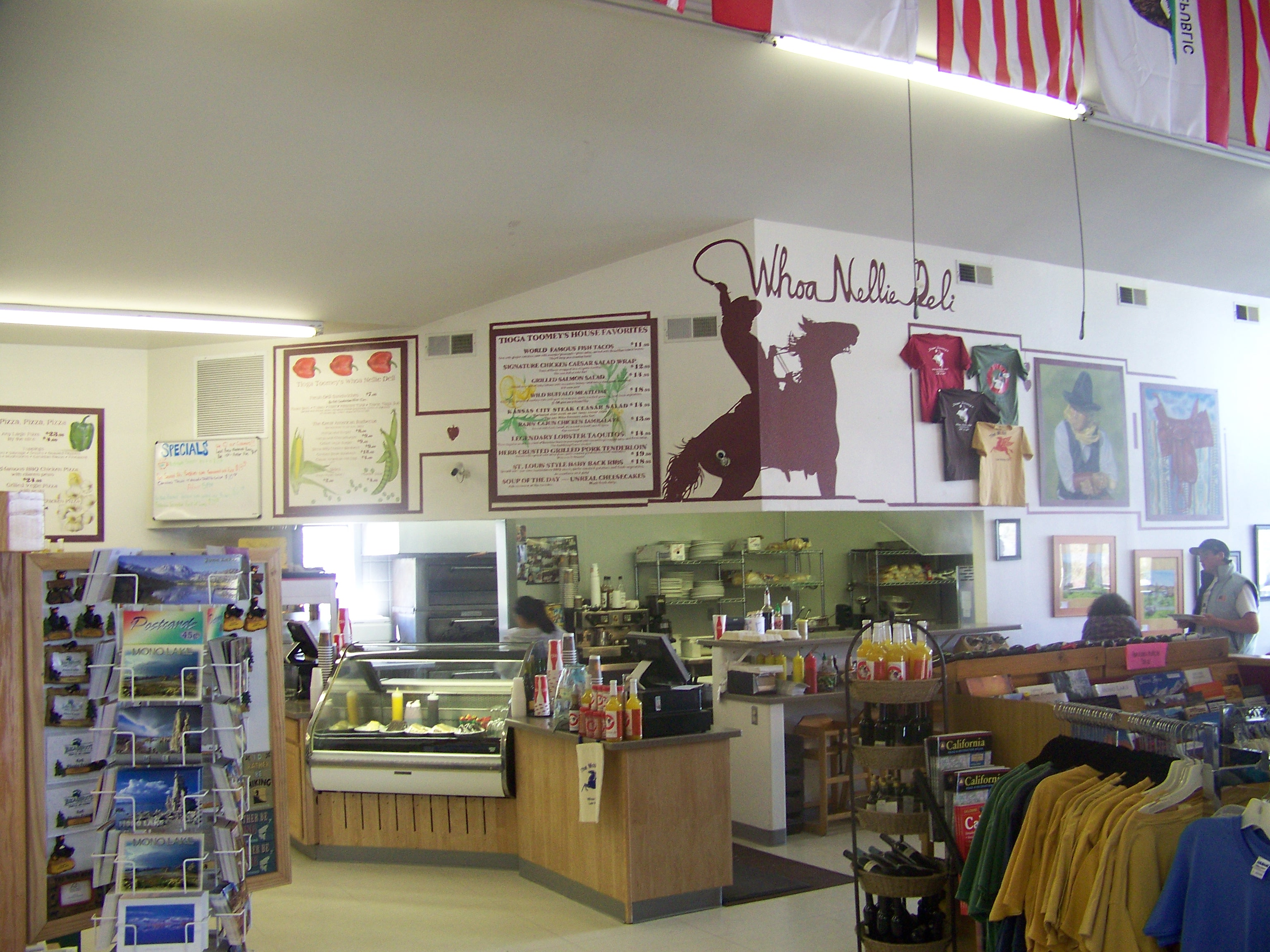
The interior of the Whoa Nellie Deli

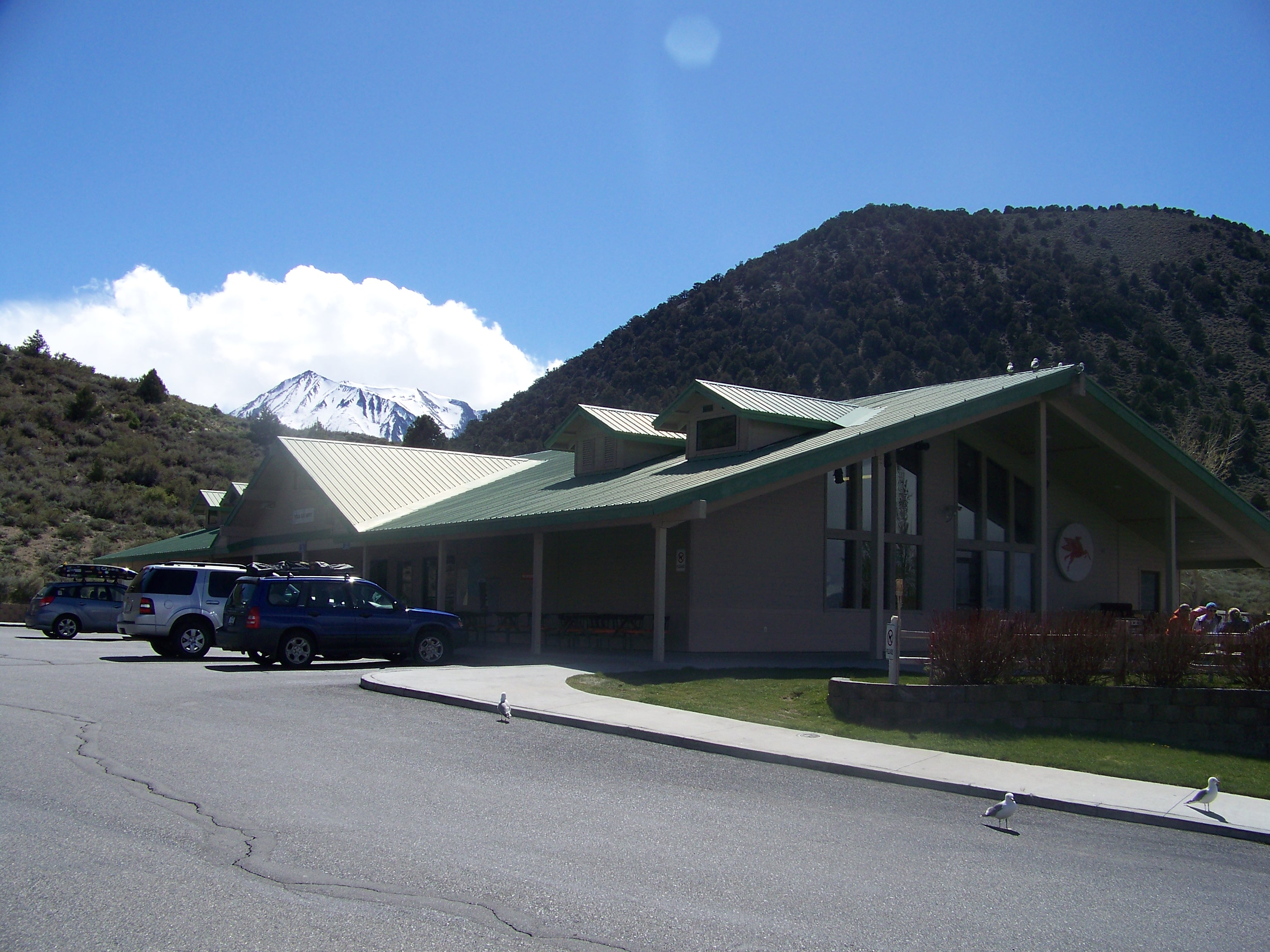
The exterior of the Whoa Nellie Deli. Mount Dana is in the background.

The Whoa Nellie Deli is a casual gourmet restaurant located in Lee Vining, California, east of Yosemite National Park and just west of Mono Lake. The juxtaposition of its cuisine with its location in a gas station, the Tioga Gas Mart, has been widely considered unusual.

== Location and services ==
The Whoa Nellie Deli is located in a Mobil gas station named the Tioga Gas Mart on a hilltop just southwest of the intersection of U.S. Route 395 and California State Route 120, one mile south of the business district of the small town of Lee Vining, California. The business was founded in 1996. Geographically, this location is where the eastern edge of the Sierra Nevada meets the western edge of the Great Basin. Mount Dana and other High Sierra peaks are visible to the west. The eastern entrance of Yosemite National Park, located at Tioga Pass, is 12 miles to the west. Mono Lake, a uniquely salty and mineral saturated body of water, is visible from the restaurant to the northeast. The gas station also offers a gift shop, a small grocery store, and picnic facilities. Live musical performances are featured about 30 times each year from late spring to early autumn, usually on Thursday and Sunday evenings. The restaurant is closed in the winter. Flying trapeze lessons were once offered, but liability insurance considerations led to the discontinuation of the lessons and removal of the apparatus.

The restaurant's location was described by the San Francisco Chronicle as "a misplaced Fellini set carved into the edge of the Mono Basin, dust devils skipping around in the distance like extras on the floor of Owens Valley."

In an article about visiting Mono Lake, The New York Times commented, "When the desire that is the cause of all human suffering returned in the form of appetite, our editors were relieved to find the Whoa Nellie Deli, a shockingly gourmet oasis located at the local Tioga Gas Mart."

In 2022, owners Dennis Domaille and his daughter, Denise Molnar announced their intention to sell the 70 acre property including the gas station, store and restaurant for $16.5 million.

== Cuisine ==
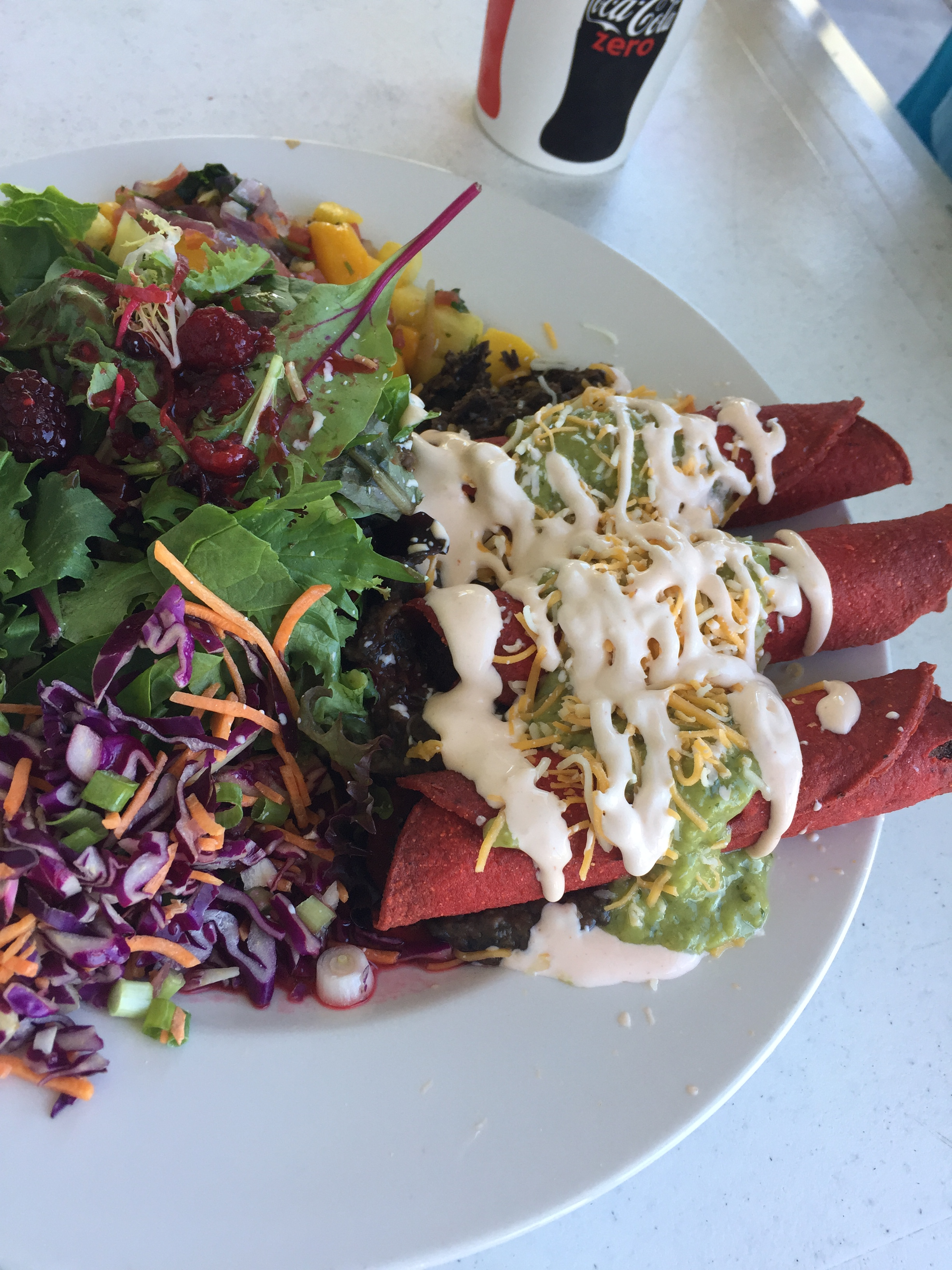
Lobster taquitos, served at Whoa Nellie Deli in 2016

Gourmet magazine observed, "For all its awesome scenery, the Yosemite Valley used to be a culinary wasteland. Now, hikers can hoof it to the national park's eastern entrance for lobster taquitos and pan-seared ahi salad served up at Whoa Nellie Deli, inside the Mobil gas station on Highway 120. Beyond the pumps, Matt Toomey turns out house specials like fish tacos with ginger coleslaw and wasabi crème fraiche, seafood stew with mashed potatoes and garlic bread and even mango Margaritas." The restaurant is located 75 miles away from Yosemite Valley, and it takes well over two hours to drive there.

Lisa Margonelli, an Irvine Fellow at New America Foundation observed in the pages of The Atlantic that the "deli" is actually a "nuttily gourmet kitchen that turns out huge platefuls of food," and that "the deli is a continuous party all summer long."

The San Marcos Daily Record of Texas said that Whoa Nellie Deli is an "exceptional eatery" that "offers unexpected surprises with great selections of fine foods."

The Los Angeles Times described chef Matt Toomey as "a manic figure in a white chef's jacket and a baseball cap" whose "charisma and sense of humor are reflected in his cooking." The apricot and wild berry glazed pork loin and the top sirloin steak with a dozen grilled shrimp were described as "beautifully presented and cooked to perfection." The dining experience was summarized this way: "To have one of the better meals of your life in a gas station is bizarre. It leaves you staring at your plate for a moment or two in disbelief."

Commenting on the incongruity between the quality of the food and the fact that gasoline is pumped at the same business, the San Diego Union-Tribune asked, "But who would have believed slices of perfectly seasoned and seared sashimi-grade ahi, fanned on a bed of edible seaweed, served in a gas station?"

== See also ==
- List of delicatessens
- Lee Vining, California
