= Aliidiomarina maris =

Scientific classification
- Domain: Bacteria
- Kingdom: Pseudomonadati
- Phylum: Pseudomonadota
- Class: Gammaproteobacteria
- Order: Alteromonadales
- Family: Idiomarinaceae
- Genus: Aliidiomarina
- Species: A. maris

Binomial name
- Aliidiomarina maris (Zhang et al. 2012) Chiu et al. 2014

Type strain
- CCTCC AB 208166, KACC 13974, CF12-14

Synonyms
- Idiomarina maris

Species of bacterium

Aliidiomarina maris is a bacterium from the genus of Aliidiomarina which has been isolated from sediments from the South China Sea.
