= Mono Lake =

Endorheic lake in California

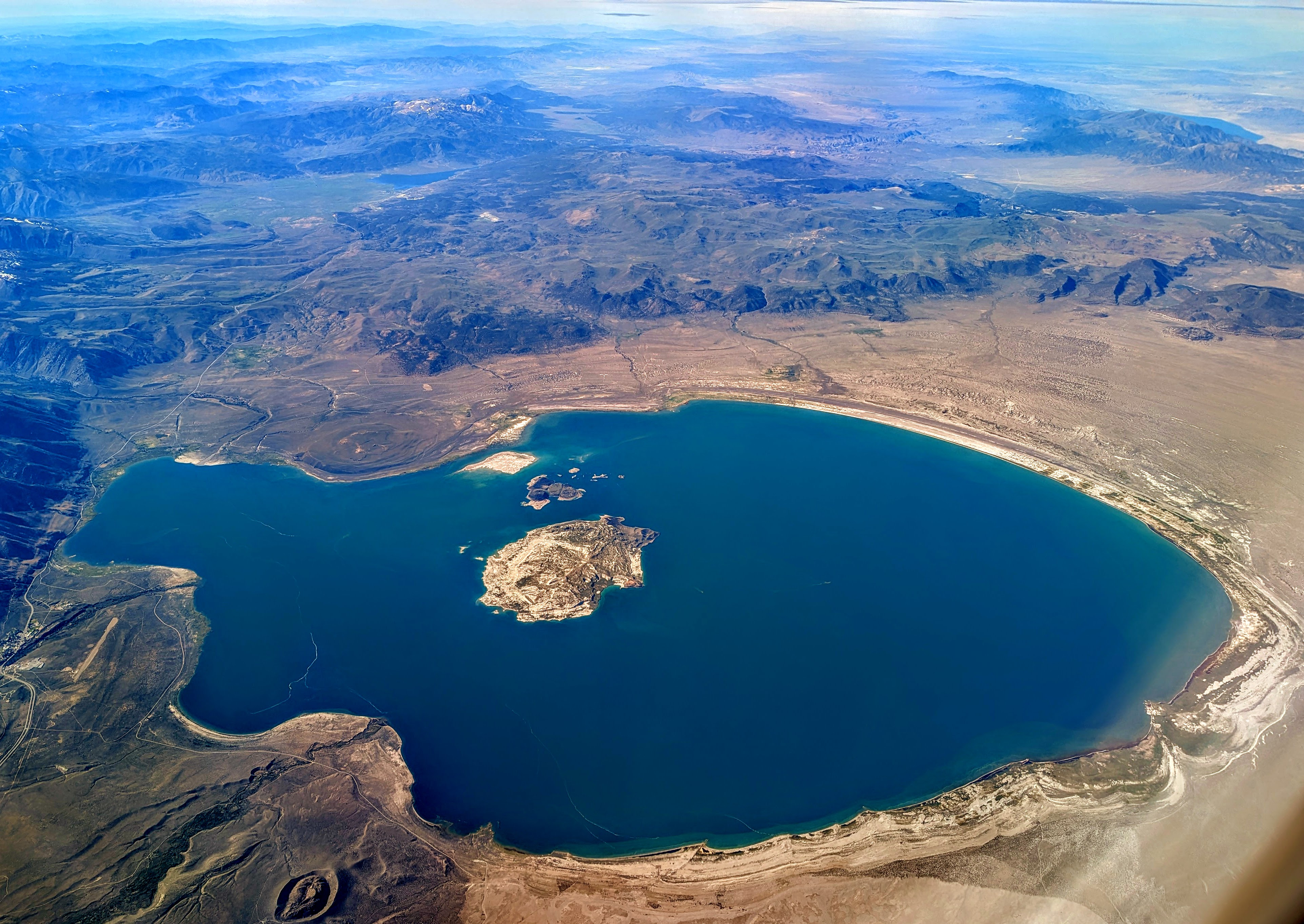
- Aerial view of Mono Lake from the south

- Location of Mono Lake in California
- Location: Mono County, California
- Coordinates: 38°01′00″N 119°00′34″W
- Type: Endorheic, Monomictic
- Primary inflows: Rush Creek, Lee Vining Creek, Mill Creek
- Primary outflows: Evaporation
- Catchment area: 780 sq mi (2,030 km^{2})
- Basin countries: United States
- Max. length: 13 mi (21 km)
- Max. width: 9.3 mi (15 km)
- Surface area: 70 mi^{2} (180 km^{2})
- Average depth: 57 ft (17 m)
- Max. depth: 159 ft (48 m)
- Water volume: 2,970,000 acre⋅ft (3.66 km^{3})
- Surface elevation: 6,383 ft (1,946 m) above sea level
- Islands: Two major: Negit Island and Paoha Island; numerous minor outcroppings (including tufa rock formations). The lake's water level is notably variable.
- References: U.S. Geological Survey Geographic Names Information System: Mono Lake

Mono Lake (/ˈmoʊnoʊ/ MOH-noh) is a saline soda lake in Mono County, California, formed at least 760,000 years ago as a terminal lake in an endorheic basin. The lack of an outlet causes high levels of salts to accumulate in the lake which make its water alkaline.

The desert lake has an unusually productive ecosystem based on brine shrimp, which thrive in its waters, and provides critical habitat for two million annual migratory birds that feed on the shrimp and alkali flies (Ephydra hians). Historically, the native Kucadikadi people ate the alkali flies' pupae, which live in the shallow waters around the edge of the lake.

When the city of Los Angeles diverted water from the freshwater streams flowing into the lake, the lake level dropped, imperiling the migratory birds. The Mono Lake Committee formed in response and won a legal battle that forced Los Angeles to partially replenish the lake level.

== Geology ==
Mono Lake lies within the Mono Basin, an endorheic basin with no outlet to the ocean. Dissolved salts in the runoff thus remain in the lake, raising the water's pH and salt concentration. The tributaries of Mono Lake include Lee Vining Creek, Rush Creek, and Mill Creek.

Geological forces formed the basin over the last five million years: basin-and-range crustal stretching and associated volcanism and faulting at the base of the Sierra Nevada.

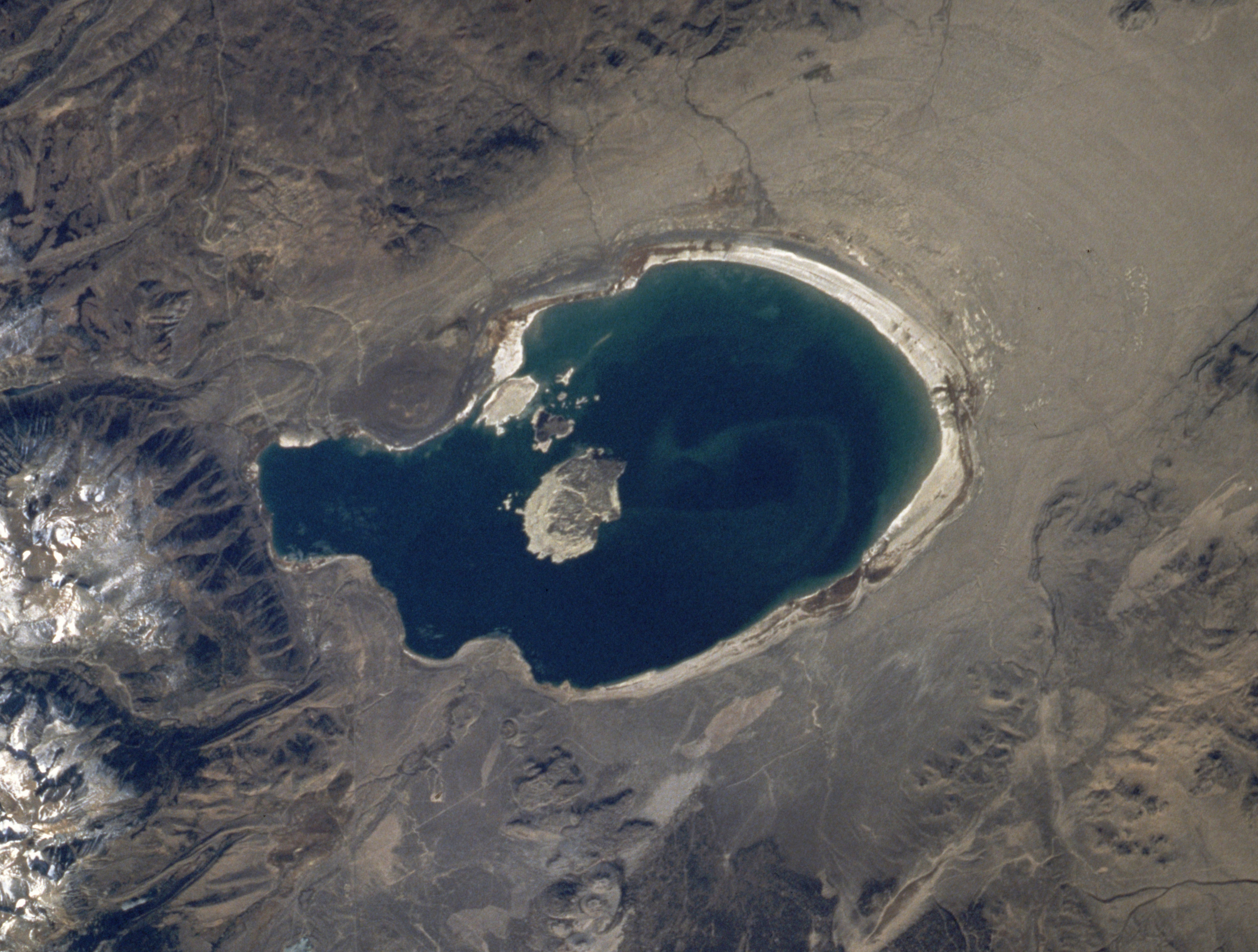
Image of Mono Lake from space, 1985

From 4.5 to 2.6 million years ago, large volumes of basalt were extruded around what is now Cowtrack Mountain (east and south of Mono Basin), eventually covering 300 square miles (780 km^{2}) and reaching a maximum thickness of 600 feet (180 m). Later volcanism in the area occurred 3.8 million to 250,000 years ago. This activity was northwest of Mono Basin and included the formation of Aurora Crater, Beauty Peak, Cedar Hill (later an island in the highest stands of Mono Lake), and Mount Hicks.

Lake Russell was the prehistoric predecessor to Mono Lake, during the Pleistocene. Its shoreline reached the modern-day elevation of 7,480 feet (2,280 m), about 1,100 feet (330 m) higher than the present-day lake. As of 1.6 million years ago, Lake Russell discharged to the northeast, into the Walker River drainage. After the Long Valley Caldera eruption 760,000 years ago, Lake Russell discharged into Adobe Lake to the southeast, then into the Owens River, and eventually into Lake Manly in Death Valley. Prominent shore lines of Lake Russell, called strandlines by geologists, can be seen west of Mono Lake.

The area around Mono Lake is currently geologically active. Volcanic activity is related to the Mono–Inyo Craters: the most recent eruption occurred 350 years ago, resulting in the formation of Paoha Island. Panum Crater (on the south shore of the lake) is an example of a combined rhyolite dome and cinder cone.

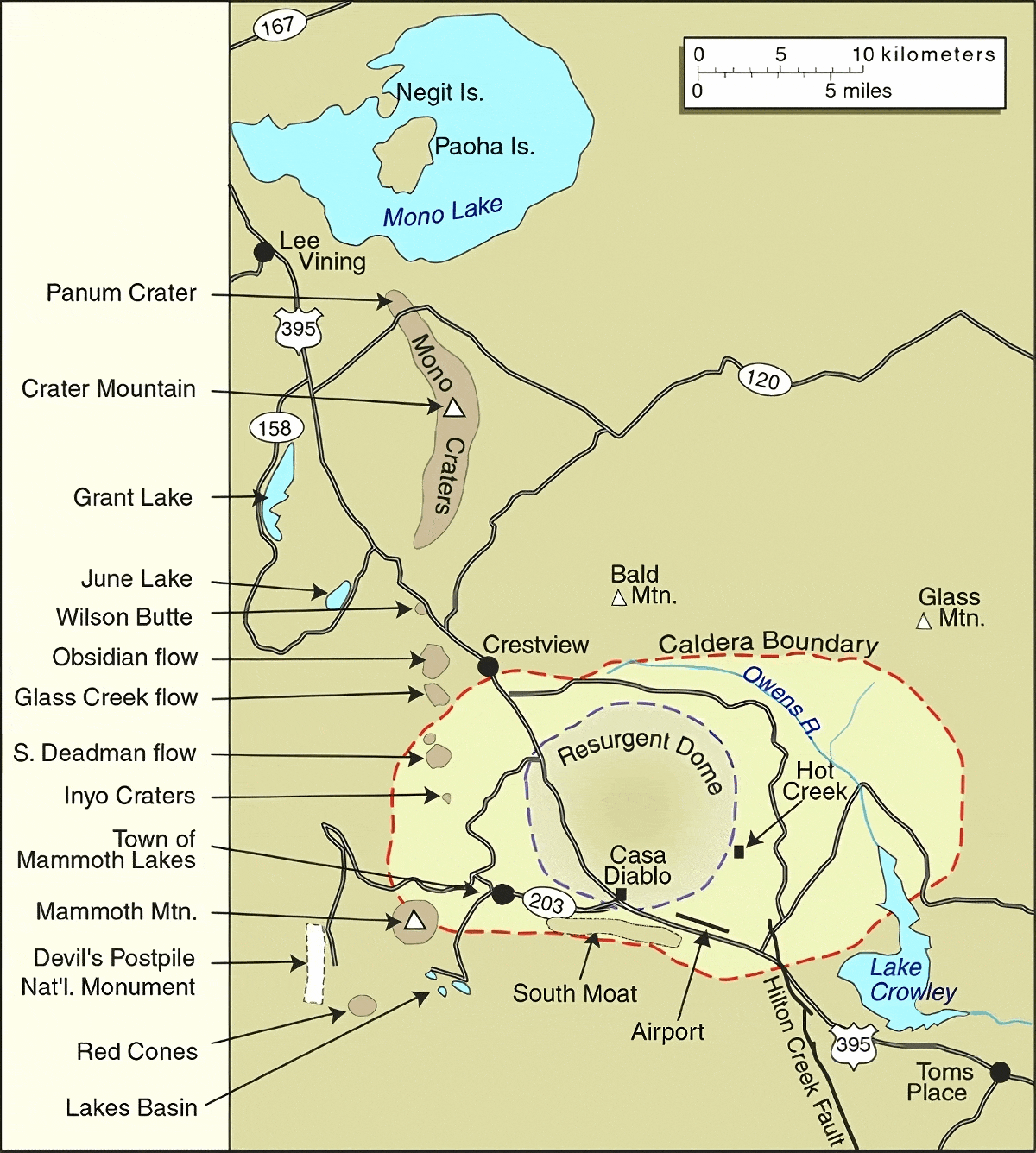
Map of the Mono Lake area showing geological features

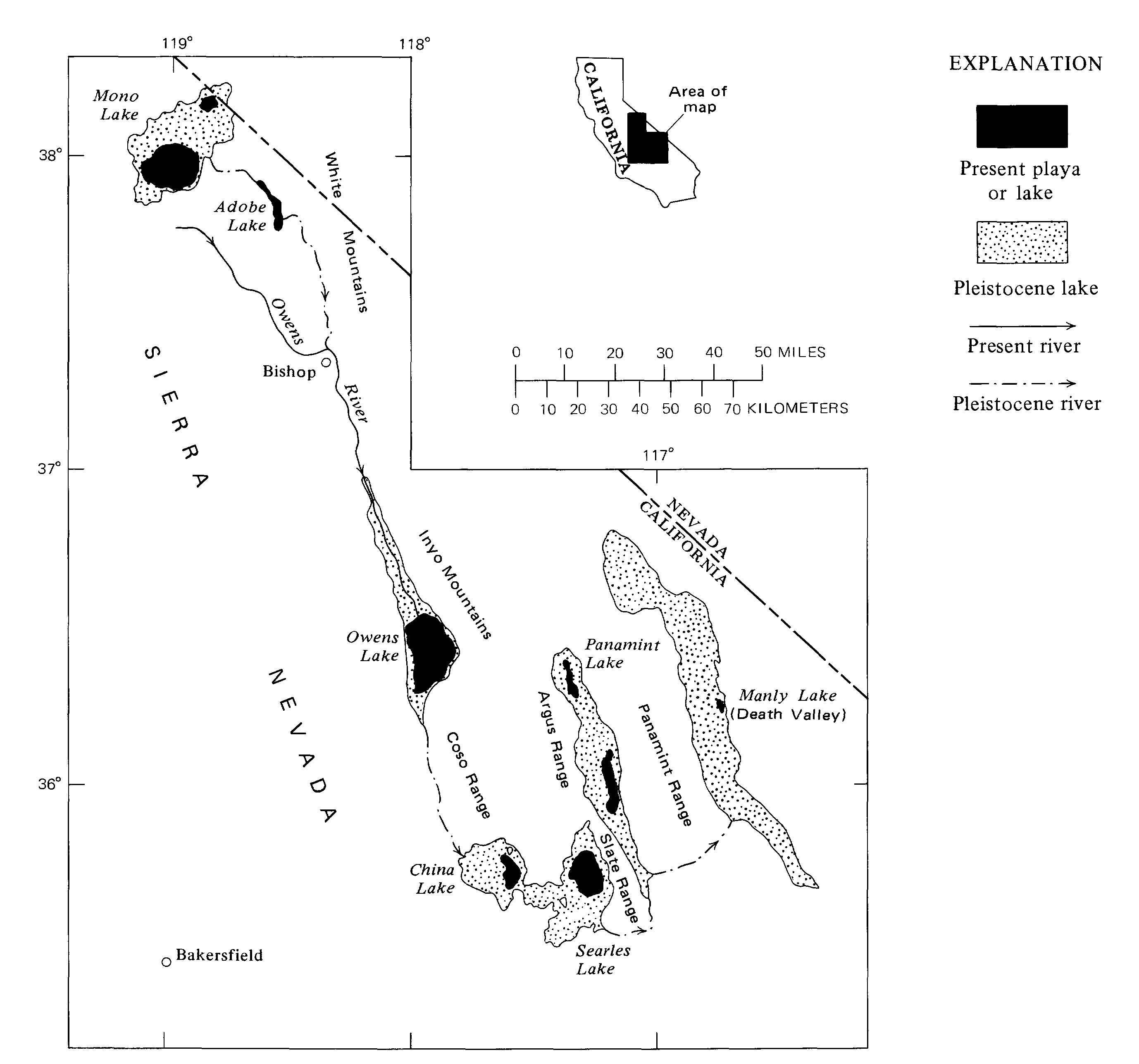
Map showing the system of once-interconnected Pleistocene lakes

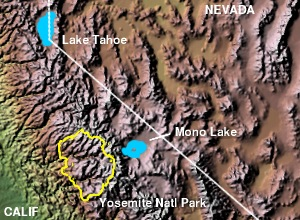
Relief map of Mono Lake and the surrounding area

== Tufa towers ==
Many columns of limestone rise above the surface of Mono Lake. These limestone towers consist primarily of calcium carbonate minerals such as calcite (CaCO_{3}). This type of limestone rock is called tufa, a term for limestone that forms at low to moderate temperatures.

=== Tufa-tower formation ===
Mono Lake is a highly alkaline lake, or soda lake. Alkalinity is a measure of how many bases are in a solution, and how well the solution can neutralize acids. Carbonate (CO^{2−}_{3}) and bicarbonate (HCO^{−}_{3}) are both bases. Hence, Mono Lake has a very high content of dissolved inorganic carbon. Through supply of calcium ions (Ca^{2+}), the water precipitates carbonate-minerals such as calcite (CaCO_{3}). Subsurface waters enter the bottom of Mono Lake through small springs. High concentrations of dissolved calcium ions in these subsurface waters cause huge amounts of calcite to precipitate around the spring orifices.

The tufa originally formed at the bottom of the lake. It took many decades, or even centuries, to form the well-known tufa towers. When lake levels fell, the tufa towers rose above the water surface and stand as the pillars seen today (see Mono lake#Lake-level history for more information).

=== Tufa morphology ===
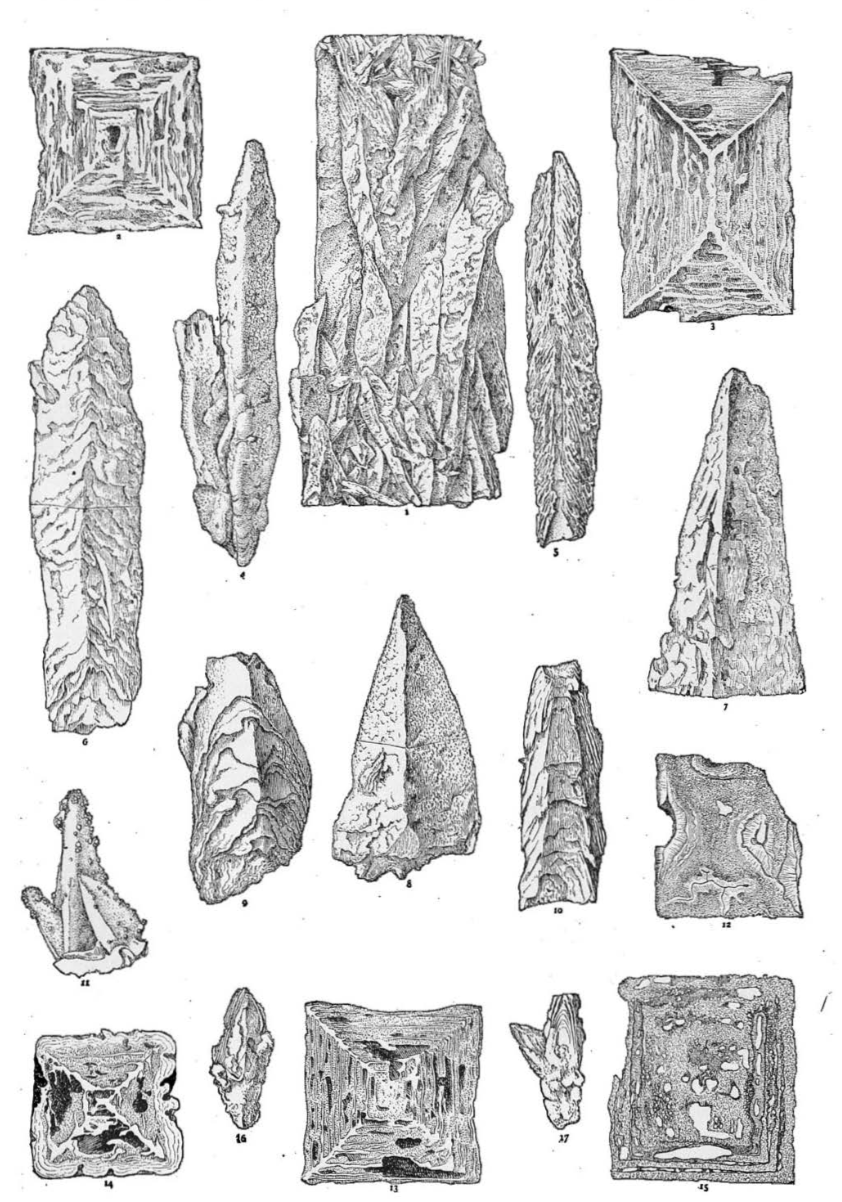
These are original sketches of thinolite made by Edward S. Dana from his book from 1884: Crystallographic Study of the Thinolite of Lake Lahontan.

Description of the Mono Lake tufa dates back to the 1880s, when Edward S. Dana and Israel C. Russell made the first systematic descriptions of the Mono Lake tufa. The tufa occurs as "modern" tufa towers. There are tufa sections from old shorelines, when the lake levels were higher. These pioneering works on tufa morphology are cited by researchers and were confirmed by James R. Dunn in 1953. The tufa types can roughly be divided into three main categories based on morphology:

- Lithoid tufa – massive and porous with a rock-like appearance
- Dendritic tufa – branching structures that look similar to small shrubs
- Thinolitic tufa – large, well-formed crystals of several centimeters

Over time, many hypotheses have been developed regarding the formation of the large thinolite crystals (also referred to as glendonite) in thinolitic tufa. It was relatively clear that the thinolites represented a calcite pseudomorph after some unknown original crystal. The original crystal was only determined when the mineral ikaite was discovered in 1963. Ikaite, or CaCO_{3}·6H_{2}O, is metastable and only crystallizes at near-freezing temperatures. It is also believed that calcite crystallization inhibitors, such as phosphate, magnesium, and organic carbon, may help stabilize ikaite. When heated, ikaite breaks down and is replaced by smaller crystals of calcite. In the Ikka Fjord of Greenland, ikaite was also observed to grow in columns similar to the tufa towers of Mono Lake. This has led scientists to believe that thinolitic tufa is an indicator of past climates in Mono Lake because they reflect very cold temperatures.

=== Tufa chemistry ===
Russell (1883) studied the chemical composition of the different tufa types in Lake Lahontan, a large Pleistocene system of multiple lakes in California, Nevada, and Oregon. Not surprisingly, it was found that the tufas consisted primarily of CaO and CO_{2}. However, they also contain minor constituents of MgO (~2 wt%), Fe/Al-oxides (.25-1.29 wt%), and PO_{5} (0.3 wt%).

== Climate ==
Climate data for Mono Lake, CA
Month	Jan	Feb	Mar	Apr	May	Jun	Jul	Aug	Sep	Oct	Nov	Dec	Year
Record high °F (°C)	66 (19)	68 (20)	72 (22)	80 (27)	87 (31)	96 (36)	97 (36)	95 (35)	91 (33)	85 (29)	74 (23)	65 (18)	97 (36)
Mean daily maximum °F (°C)	40.4 (4.7)	44.5 (6.9)	50.5 (10.3)	58.4 (14.7)	67.6 (19.8)	76.6 (24.8)	83.8 (28.8)	82.7 (28.2)	75.9 (24.4)	65.5 (18.6)	51.7 (10.9)	42.2 (5.7)	61.7 (16.5)
Mean daily minimum °F (°C)	19.7 (−6.8)	21.5 (−5.8)	24.8 (−4.0)	29.5 (−1.4)	36.4 (2.4)	43.2 (6.2)	49.6 (9.8)	49.0 (9.4)	42.8 (6.0)	34.6 (1.4)	27.3 (−2.6)	21.8 (−5.7)	33.4 (0.7)
Record low °F (°C)	−14 (−26)	−9 (−23)	1 (−17)	12 (−11)	16 (−9)	25 (−4)	27 (−3)	32 (0)	18 (−8)	8 (−13)	2 (−17)	−8 (−22)	−14 (−26)
Average precipitation inches (mm)	2.17 (55)	2.21 (56)	1.38 (35)	0.66 (17)	0.57 (14)	0.36 (9.1)	0.55 (14)	0.45 (11)	0.63 (16)	0.64 (16)	1.96 (50)	2.32 (59)	13.9 (352.1)
Average snowfall inches (cm)	15.5 (39)	15.3 (39)	11.4 (29)	3.1 (7.9)	0.4 (1.0)	0 (0)	0 (0)	0 (0)	0 (0)	0.7 (1.8)	7.6 (19)	12.0 (30)	66 (166.7)
Source: http://www.wrcc.dri.edu/cgi-bin/cliMAIN.pl?ca5779

== Limnology ==
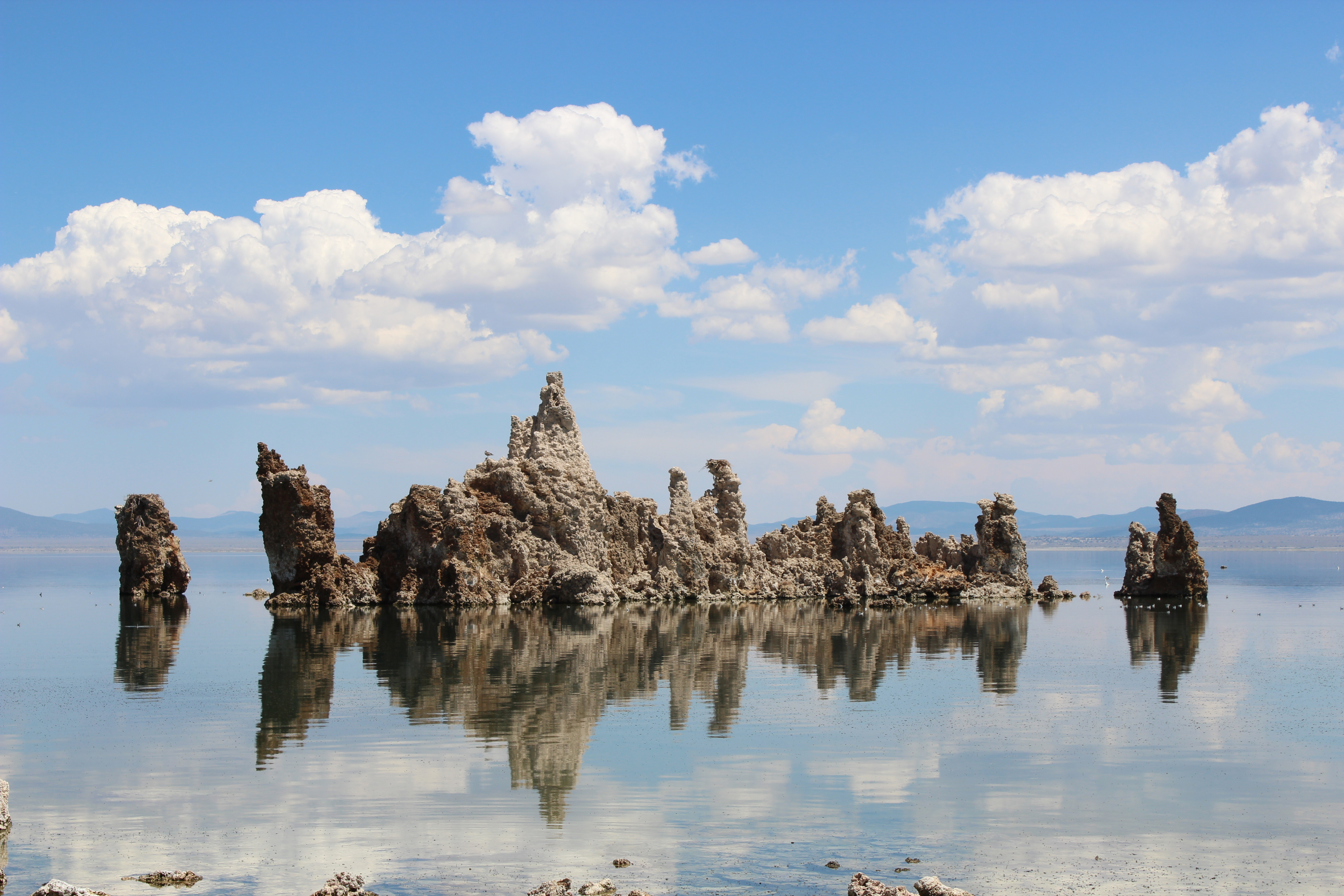
Mono Lake's "South Tufa" area.

The limnology of the lake shows that it contains approximately 280 million tons of dissolved salts, with salinity varying with the amount of water in the lake at any given time. Before 1941, average salinity was approximately 50 grams per liter (g/L) (compared to a value of 31.5 g/L for the world's oceans). In January 1982, when the lake reached its lowest level of 1,942 metres (6,372 ft), the salinity had nearly doubled to 99 g/L. In 2002, it was measured at 78 g/L and is expected to stabilize at an average of 69 g/L as the lake replenished over the next 20 years.

An unintended consequence of ending the water diversions was the onset of a period of "meromixis" in Mono Lake. In the time before this, Mono Lake was typically "monomictic", which means that at least once each year, the deeper waters and the shallower waters of the lake mixed thoroughly, thus bringing oxygen and other nutrients to the deep waters. In meromictic lakes, the deeper waters do not undergo this mixing; the deeper layers are more saline than the water near the surface, and are typically nearly devoid of oxygen. As a result, becoming meromictic greatly changes a lake's ecology.

Mono Lake has experienced meromictic periods in the past; the most recent episode of meromixis, brought on by the end of water diversions, commenced in 1994 and ended by 2004.

=== Lake-level history ===
An essential characteristic of Mono Lake is that it is a closed lake, meaning it has no outflow. Water can only escape the lake if it evaporates or is lost to groundwater. This may cause closed lakes to become very saline. The reconstruction of historical Mono Lake levels using carbon and oxygen isotopes has also revealed a correlation with well-documented changes in climate.

In the recent past, Earth experienced periods of increased glaciation known as ice ages. This geological period of ice ages is known as the Pleistocene, which lasted until ~11 ka. Lake levels in Mono Lake can reveal how the climate fluctuated. For example, during the Pleistocene, when the climate was colder, the lake level was higher because there was less evaporation and more precipitation. Following the Pleistocene, the lake level was generally lower due to increased evaporation and decreased precipitation associated with a warmer climate.

The lake level has fluctuated during the Holocene, since the end of the ice ages. The Holocene high point is at elevation 6,499 feet (1,980.8 m), reached in approximately 1820 BCE. The low point before modern diversions is at elevation 6,368 feet (1,940.9 m), reached in 143 CE. The lowest modern level due to diversions is at 6,372.0 feet (1,942.2 m), reached in 1980.

== Ecology ==
=== Aquatic life ===
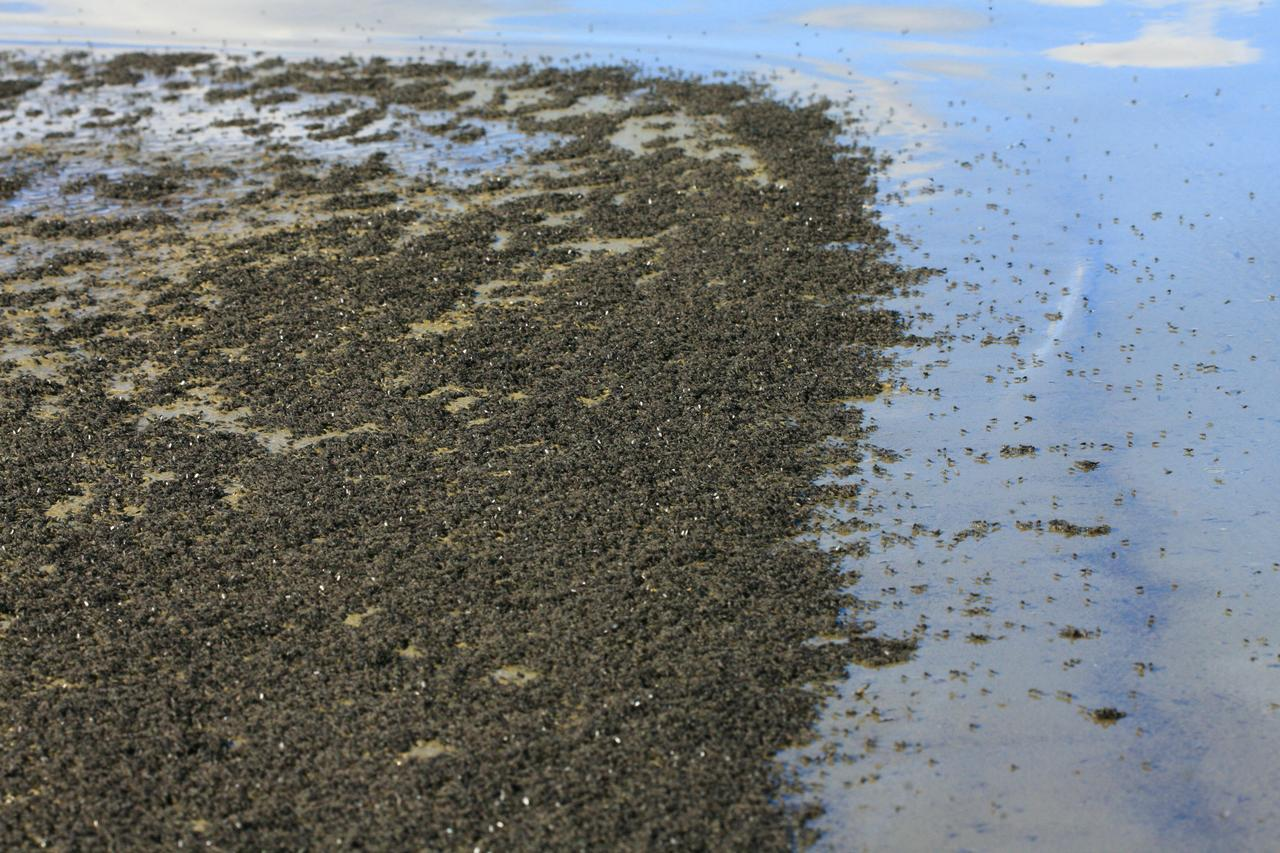
Large numbers of alkali flies at Mono Lake.

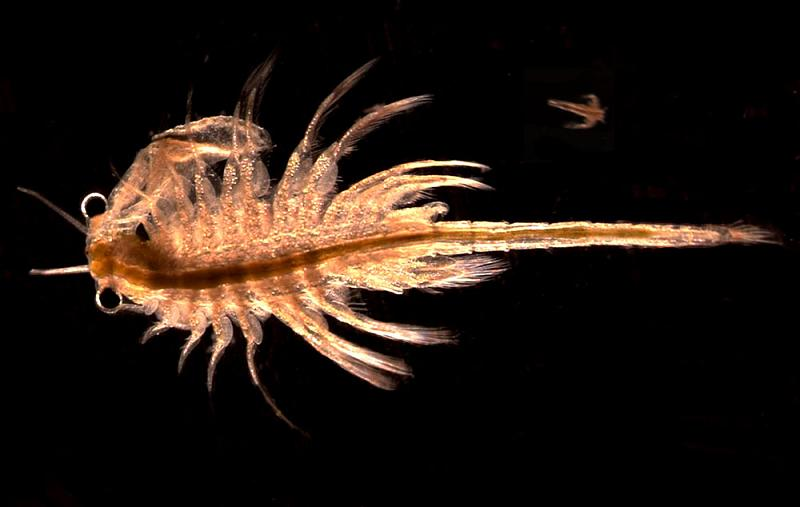
Artemia monica, the Mono Lake brine shrimp.

The hypersalinity and high alkalinity (pH=10, or equivalent to 4 milligrams of NaOH per liter of water) of the lake mean that no fish are native to the lake. An attempt by the California Department of Fish and Game to stock the lake failed.

The whole food chain of the lake is based on the high population of single-celled planktonic algae present in the photic zone of the lake. These algae reproduce rapidly during winter and early spring after winter runoff brings nutrients to the surface layer of water. By March, the lake is "as green as pea soup" with photosynthesizing algae.

The lake is famous for the Mono Lake brine shrimp, Artemia monica, a tiny species of brine shrimp, no bigger than a thumbnail, that is endemic to the lake. During the warmer summer months, an estimated 4–6 trillion brine shrimp inhabit the lake. Brine shrimp have no nutritional value for humans but are a staple for birds in the region. The brine shrimp feed on microscopic algae.

Alkali flies, Ephydra hians, live along the lake's shores and swim underwater, encased in small air bubbles, to graze and lay eggs. These flies are an important food source for migratory and nesting birds.

Eight nematode species were found living in the littoral sediment:

- Auanema spec., which is outstanding for its extreme arsenic resistance (survives concentrations 500 times higher than humans), having three sexes, and being viviparous.
- Pellioditis spec.
- Mononchoides americanus
- Diplogaster rivalis
- species of the family Mermithidae
- Prismatolaimus dolichurus
- 2 species of the order Monhysterida

=== Birds ===
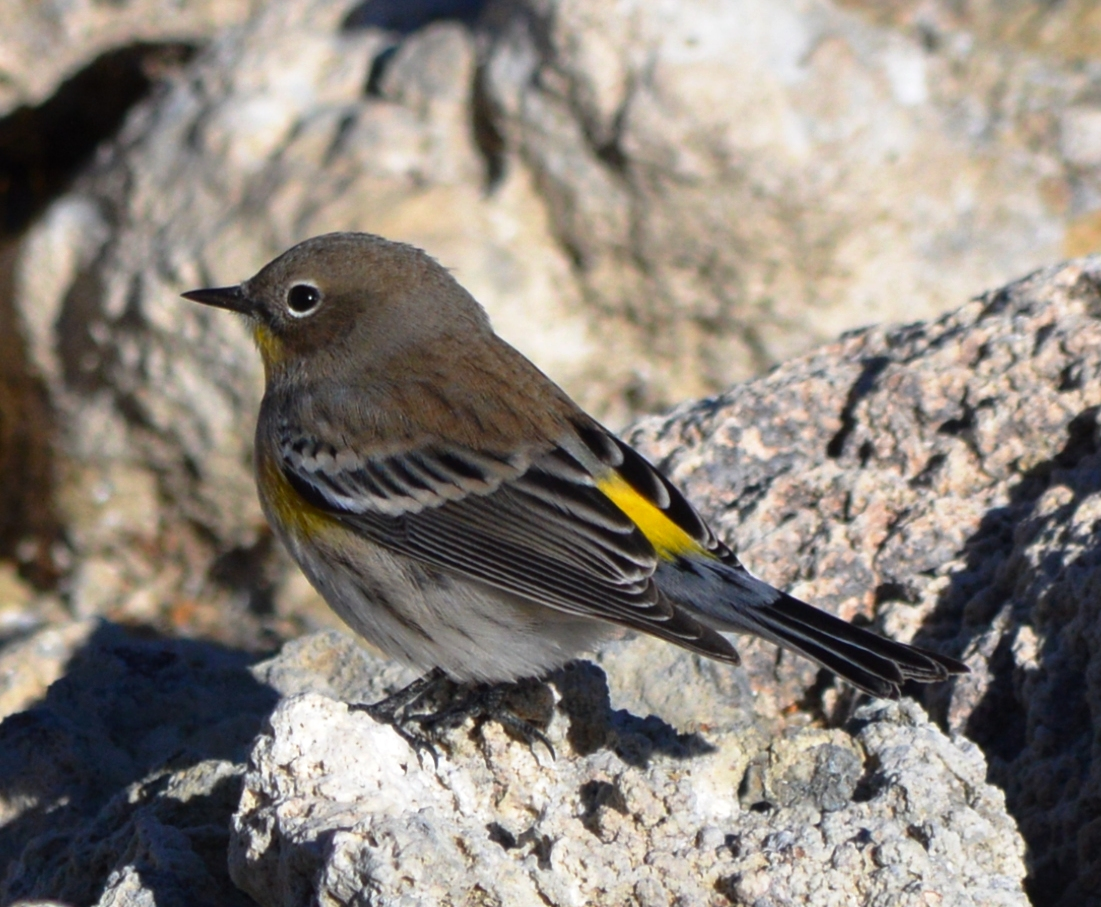
A female Audubon's warbler on tufa in the "South Tufa" area.

Mono Lake is a vital resting and eating stop for migratory shorebirds and has been recognized as a site of international importance by the Western Hemisphere Shorebird Reserve Network. Nearly 2,000,000 waterbirds, including 35 species of shorebirds, use Mono Lake to rest and eat for at least part of the year. Some shorebirds that depend on the resources of Mono Lake include American avocets, killdeer, and sandpipers. One to two million eared grebes and phalaropes use Mono Lake during their long migrations.

Late every summer, tens of thousands of Wilson's phalaropes and red-necked phalaropes arrive from their nesting grounds, and feed until they continue their migration to South America or the tropical oceans, respectively.

In addition to migratory birds, a few species spend several months nesting at Mono Lake. Mono Lake has the second-largest nesting population of California gulls, Larus californicus, second only to the Great Salt Lake in Utah. Since abandoning the landbridged Negit Island in the late 1970s, California gulls have moved to some nearby islets and have established new, if less protected, nesting sites. Cornell University and Point Blue Conservation Science have continued the study of nesting populations in Mono Lake that began 35 years ago. Snowy plovers also arrive at Mono Lake each spring to nest along the northern and eastern shores.

== History ==
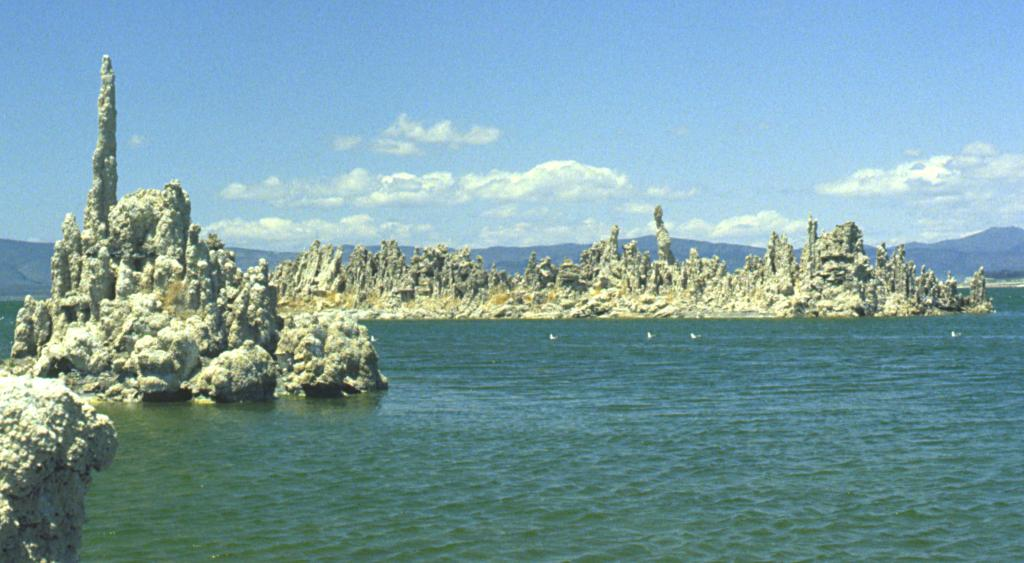
Exposed tufa towers in Mono Lake; South Tufa (1981).

=== Native Americans ===
The indigenous people of Mono Lake are from a band of the Northern Paiute, called the Kutzadika'a. They speak the Northern Paiute language. The Kutzadika'a traditionally forage alkali fly pupae, called kutsavi in their language.

The term "Mono" is derived from "Monachi", a Yokuts term for the tribes that live on both the east and west side of the Sierra Nevada.

During early contact, the first known Mono Lake Paiute chief was Captain John.

The Mono tribe has two bands: Eastern and Western. The Eastern Mono joined the Western Mono bands' villages annually at Hetch Hetchy Valley, Yosemite Valley, and along the Merced River to gather acorns, different plant species, and to trade. The Western Mono and Eastern Mono traditionally lived in the south-central Sierra Nevada foothills, including Historical Yosemite Valley.

Present-day Mono Reservations are currently located in Big Pine, Bishop, and several in Madera County and Fresno County, California.

=== Conservation efforts ===
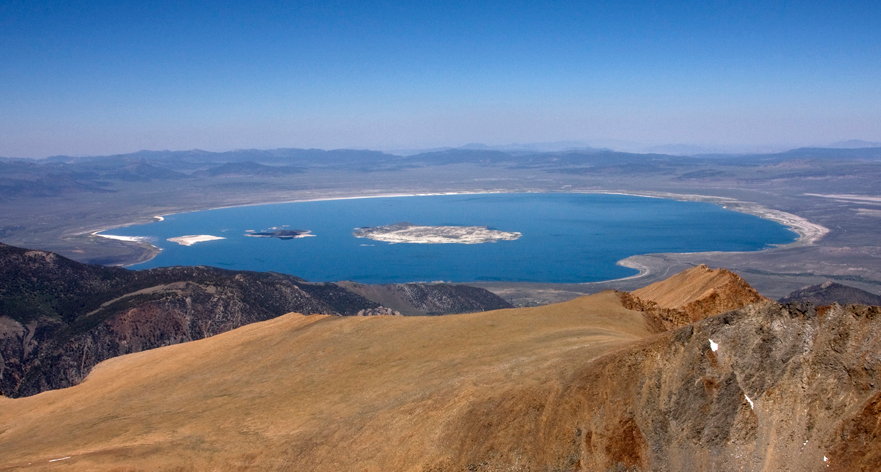
Mono Lake viewed from the summit of Mount Dana. Note near-landbridge at left, almost connecting Negit Island with the mainland shoreline.

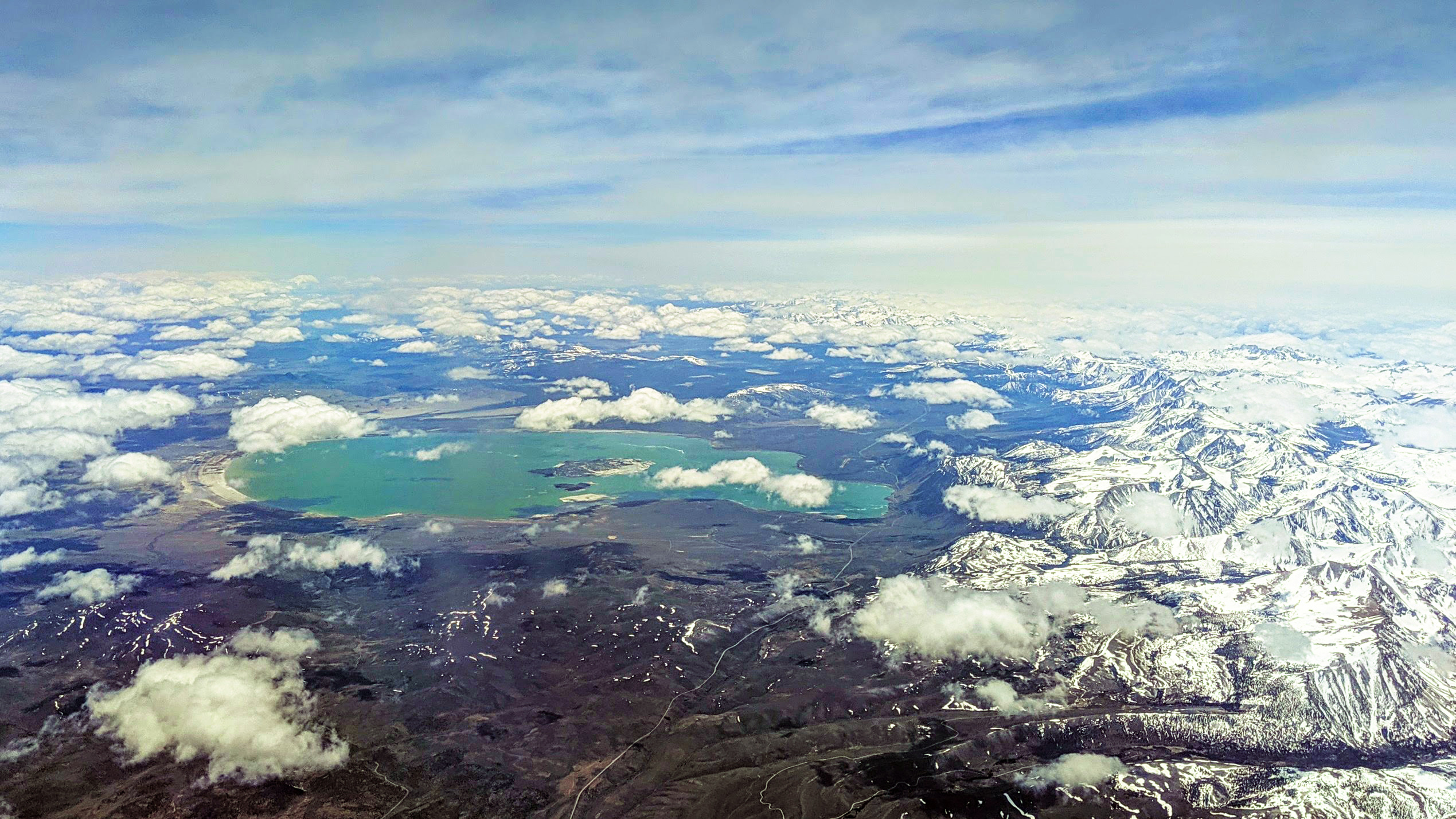
Aerial view of Mono Lake in May 2019, with generous snow pack promising a good summer for the lake.

The city of Los Angeles diverted water from the Owens River into the Los Angeles Aqueduct in 1913. In 1941, the Los Angeles Department of Water and Power extended the Los Angeles Aqueduct system farther northward into the Mono Basin with the completion of the Mono Craters Tunnel between the Grant Lake Reservoir on Rush Creek and the Upper Owens River. So much water was diverted that evaporation soon exceeded inflow, and the surface level of Mono Lake fell rapidly. By 1982, the lake was reduced to 37,688 acres (15,252 ha), 69% of its 1941 surface area. By 1990, the lake had dropped 45 vertical feet and had lost half its volume relative to the 1941 pre-diversion water level. As a result, alkaline sands and formerly submerged tufa towers became exposed, the water salinity doubled, and Negit Island became a peninsula, exposing the nests of California gulls to predators (such as coyotes), and forcing the gull colony to abandon this site.

In 1974, ecologist David Gaines and his student David Winkler studied the Mono Lake ecosystem and became instrumental in alerting the public of the effects of the lower water level with Winkler's 1976 ecological inventory of the Mono Basin. The National Science Foundation funded the first comprehensive ecological study of Mono Lake, conducted by Gaines and undergraduate students. In June 1977, the Davis Institute of Ecology at the University of California published a report, "An Ecological Study of Mono Lake, California", which alerted California to the ecological dangers posed by the diversion of water from the lake for municipal use.

Gaines formed the Mono Lake Committee in 1978. He and Sally Judy, a UC Davis student, led the committee and pursued an informational tour of California. They joined the Audubon Society in a now-famous court battle, National Audubon Society v. Superior Court, to protect Mono Lake through state public trust laws. While these efforts have resulted in positive change, the surface level is still below historical levels, and exposed shorelines are a source of significant alkaline dust during periods of high winds.

Owens Lake, the once-navigable terminus of the Owens River, which had sustained a healthy ecosystem, is now a dry lakebed during dry years due to water diversions beginning in the 1920s. Mono Lake was spared this fate when the California State Water Resources Control Board (after over a decade of litigation) issued an order (SWRCB Decision 1631) to protect Mono Lake and its tributary streams on September 28, 1994. SWRCB Board Vice-chair Marc Del Piero was the sole Hearing Officer (see D-1631). In 1941 the surface level was at 6,417 feet (1,956 m) above sea level. As of October 2022, Mono Lake was at 6,378.7 feet (1,944 m) above sea level. The lake level of 6,392 feet (1,948 m) above sea level is the goal, designed to ensure that the lake would be able to reach and sustain a minimum surface level that is generally agreed to be the minimum for keeping the ecosystem healthy. It has been more difficult during years of drought in the American West.

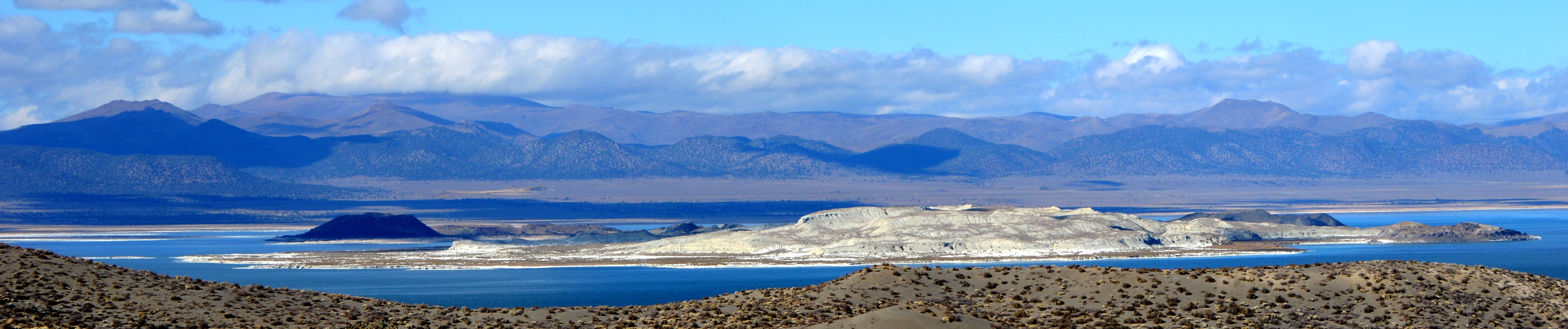
Mono Lake as seen from California State Route 120 (Mono Mills Road) on south

== In popular culture ==
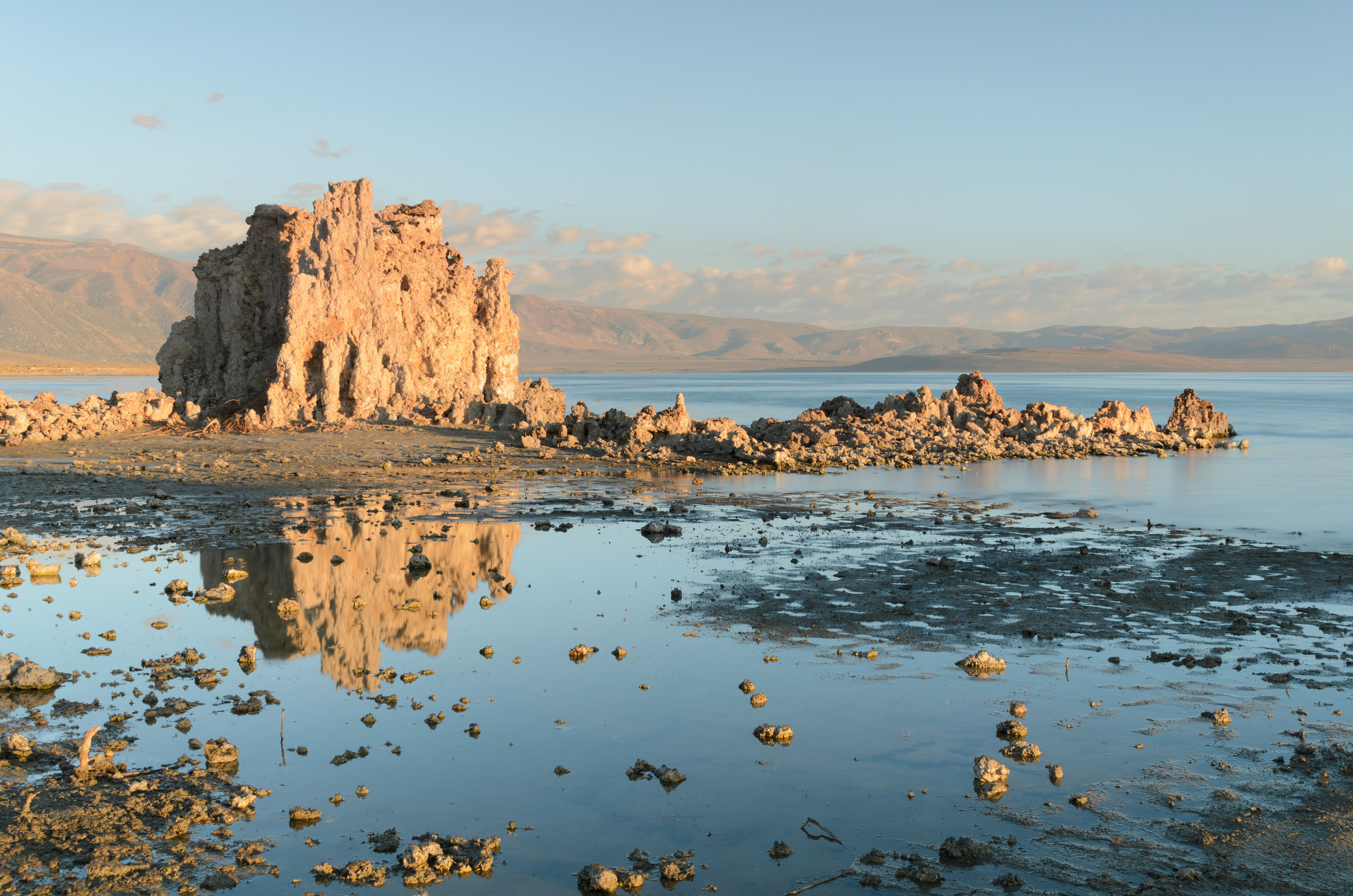
"South Tufa, Mono Lake" (2013).

=== Artwork ===
In 1968, the artist Robert Smithson made Mono Lake Non-Site (Cinders near Black Point) using pumice collected while visiting Mono on July 27, 1968, with his wife Nancy Holt and Michael Heizer (both prominent visual artists). In 2004, Nancy Holt made a short film entitled Mono Lake using Super 8 footage and photographs of this trip. An audio recording by Smithson and Heizer, two songs by Waylon Jennings, and Michel Legrand's Le Jeu, the main theme of Jacques Demy's film Bay of Angels (1963), were used for the soundtrack.

The Diver, a photo taken by Aubrey Powell of Hipgnosis for Pink Floyd's album Wish You Were Here (1975), features what appears to be a man diving into a lake, creating no ripples. The photo was taken at Mono Lake, and the tufa towers are a prominent part of the landscape. The effect was actually created when the diver performed a handstand underwater until the ripples dissipated.

=== In print ===
Mark Twain's Roughing It, published in 1872, provides an informative early description of Mono Lake in its natural condition in the 1860s. Twain found the lake to be lying "in a lifeless, treeless, hideous desert... the loneliest place on earth."

=== In film ===
A scene featuring a volcano in the film Fair Wind to Java (1953) was shot at Mono Lake.

Most of the film High Plains Drifter (1973) by Clint Eastwood was shot on the southern shores of Mono Lake in the 1970s. An entire town was built here for the film, and later removed when shooting was complete.

=== In music ===
The music video for glam metal band Cinderella's 1988 power ballad "Don't Know What You Got ('Till It's Gone)" was filmed by the lake.

== See also ==
- Bodie, a nearby ghost town
- List of lakes in California
- Mono Lake Tufa State Reserve
- Mono Basin National Scenic Area
- GFAJ-1, an organism from Mono Lake that has been at the center of a scientific controversy over hypothetical arsenic in DNA.
- List of drying lakes
- Whoa Nellie Deli, located in Lee Vining, California, overlooking Mono Lake
- Monolake, a Berlin-based electronic music project named after the lake

== Bibliography ==
- Jayko, A.S., et al. (2013). Methods and Spatial Extent of Geophysical Investigations, Mono Lake, California, 2009 to 2011. Reston, Va.: U.S. Department of the Interior, U.S. Geological Survey.
- Miller, C.D.; et al. (1982). "Potential hazards from future volcanic eruptions in the Long Valley-Mono Lake area, east-central California and southwest Nevada: a preliminary assessment". U.S. Geological Survey Circular (877). Reston, Virginia: U.S. Geological Survey.
