= Idiomarinaceae =

Scientific classification
- Domain: Bacteria
- Kingdom: Pseudomonadati
- Phylum: Pseudomonadota
- Class: Gammaproteobacteria
- Order: Alteromonadales
- Family: Idiomarinaceae; Ivanova et al. 2004

Genera
- Aliidiomarina; Idiomarina

Family of bacteria

Idiomarinaceae is a Gram-negative and mesophilic family in the order of Alteromonadales. Bacteria of the family Idiomarinaceae occur in saline environments.
