= False White Mountain =

Mountain peak in northern Yosemite National Park, United States

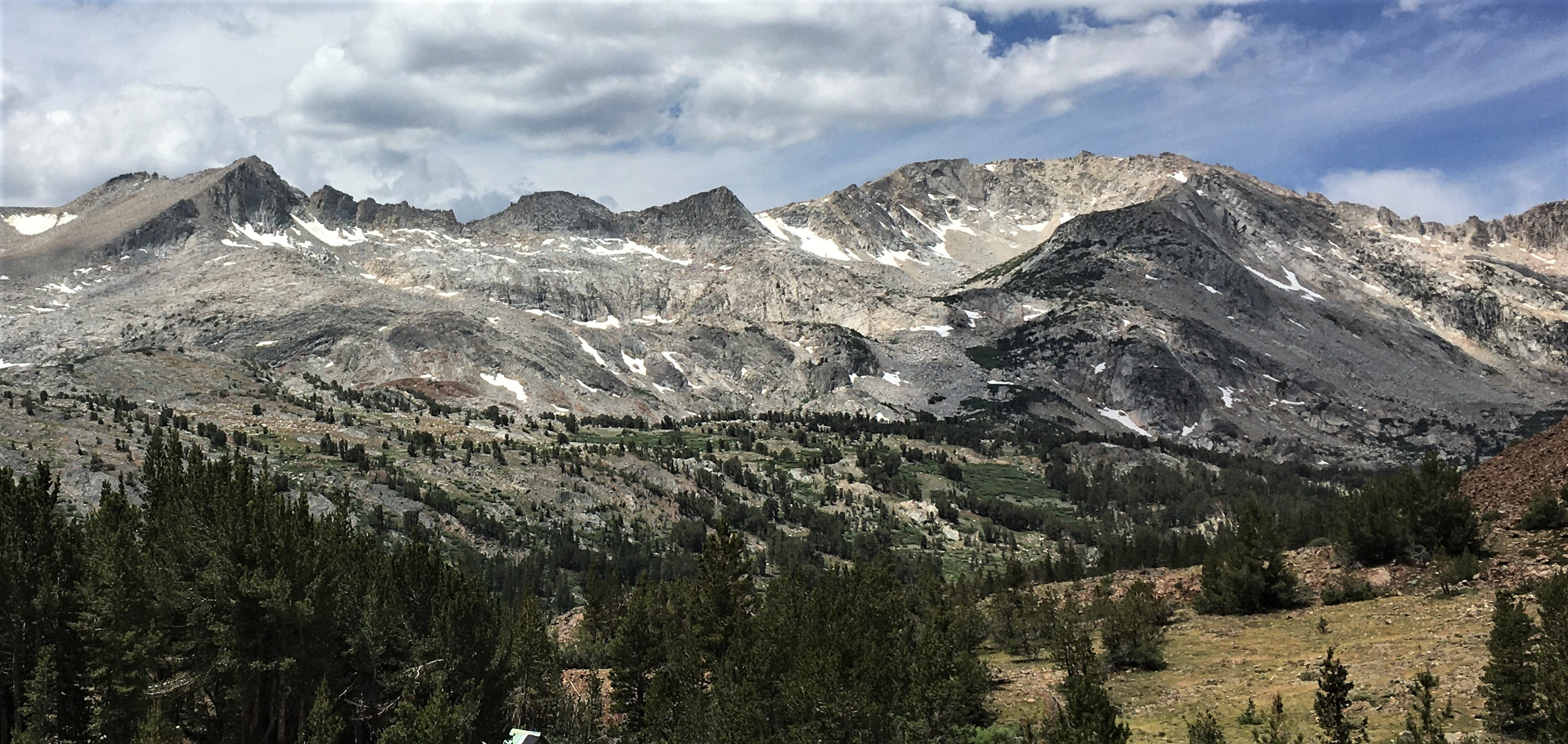
- False White Mountain (left) and White Mountain (right) from the northeast

Highest point
- Elevation: 12,002 ft (3,658 m) NAVD 88
- Prominence: 482 ft (147 m)
- Coordinates: 37°56′N 119°18′W

Geography
- Location within California Location within the United States
- Location: Yosemite National Park; Tuolumne County, California, U.S.
- Parent range: Sierra Nevada

Climbing
- Easiest route: class 2 to class 3

False White Mountain is a mountain, in the northern part of Yosemite National Park. It is the 24th highest mountain, in Yosemite National Park. False White Mountain can be climbed, as a day hike, from Tioga Pass.

False White Mountain is near Mount Conness, Tioga Peak, Mount Dana, and Lembert Dome, thus is in the Tuolumne Meadows area.

Of importance, False White Mountain has been often confused with White Mountain, thus the "false" reference.

There have been proposals, to re-name False White Mountain, as Peak 12,002, Sharsmith Peak, False White, and False White Mountain Peak.

== Climate ==
False White Mountain is located in an alpine climate zone. Most weather fronts originate in the Pacific Ocean, and travel east toward the Sierra Nevada mountains. As fronts approach, they are forced upward by the peaks (orographic lift), causing moisture in the form of rain or snowfall to drop onto the range.

== See also ==
- Geology of the Yosemite area

== Gallery ==
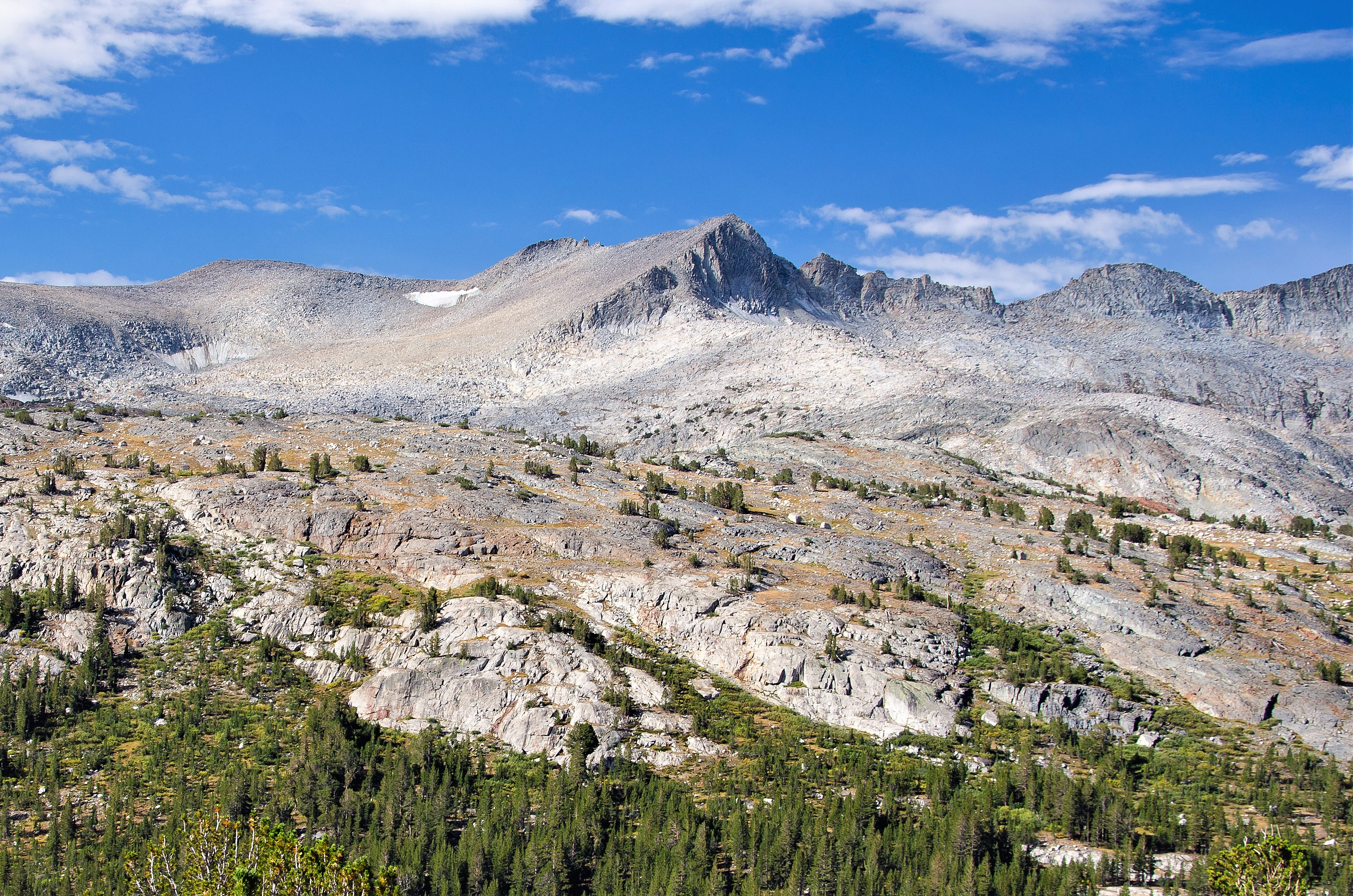
Northeast aspect

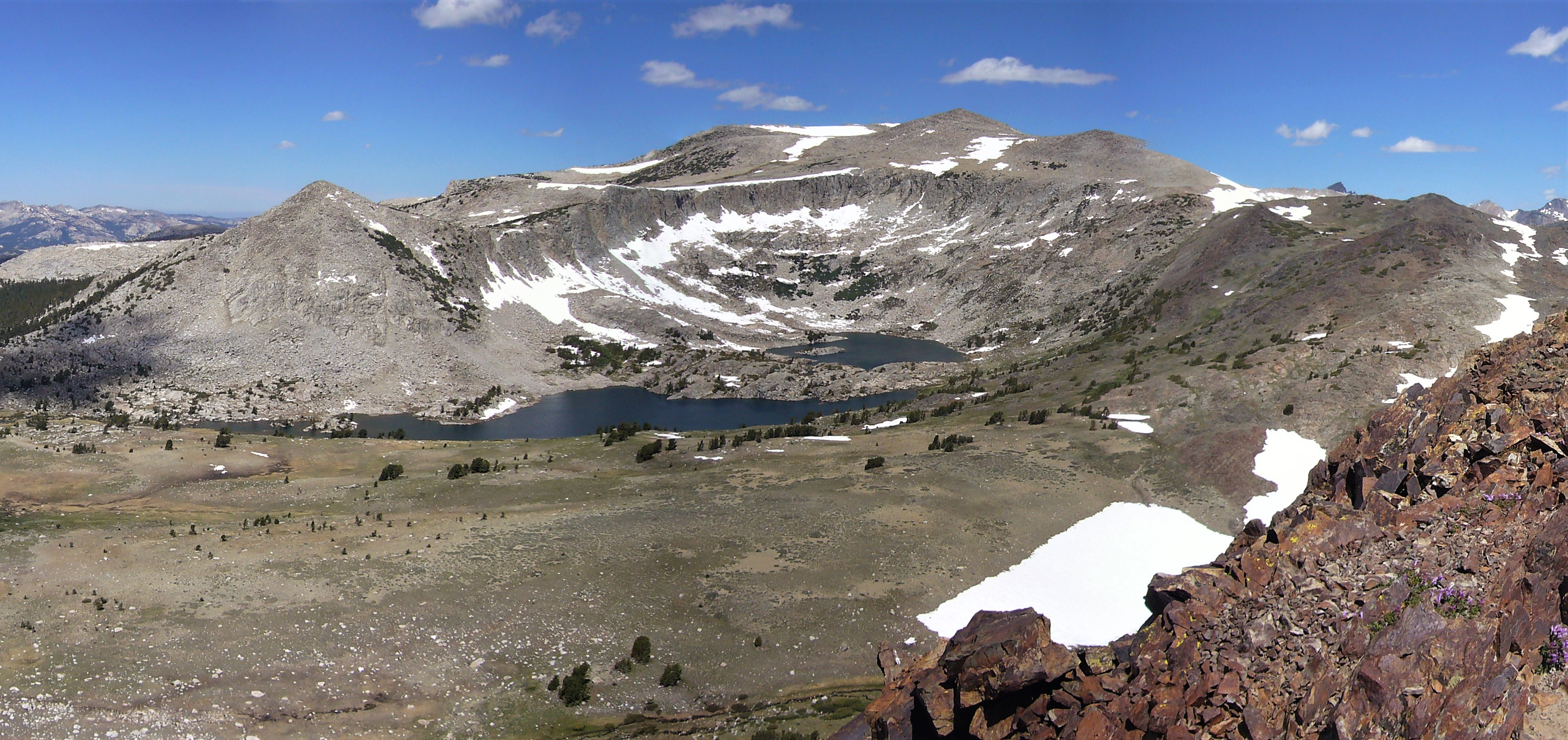
Southeast aspect of False White Mountain and Granite Lakes seen from Gaylor Peak

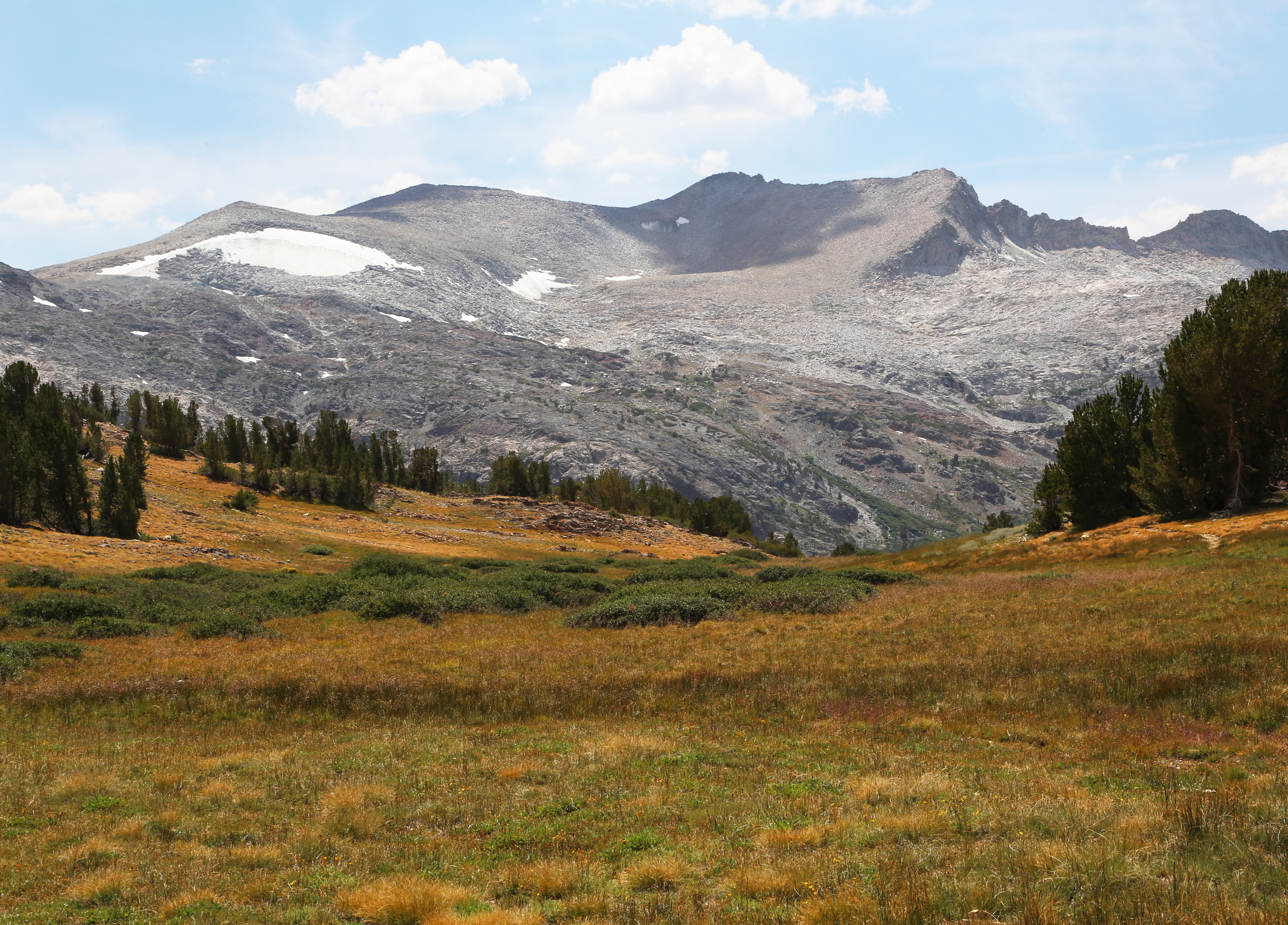
East aspect
