= Tioga Pass caldera =

Rock formation in Yosemite National Park

Coordinates: 37.9184°N 119.248°W

The Tioga Pass caldera is a Middle or Late Triassic caldera exposed near the eastern boundary of Yosemite National Park in the U.S. state of California. Formation of the caldera was accompanied by the eruption of widespread 222-million-year-old rhyolitic ash flow tuff as an extensive outflow sheet. Metasedimentary and metavolcanic rocks of the intracaldera sequence are exposed on Gaylor Peak and Mount Dana. The caldera and related volcanic and plutonic rocks were part of a magmatic arc along the continental margin of east-central California during the early Mesozoic.
