= Dana Glacier =

Dana Glacier may refer to:

- Dana Glacier (Antarctica)
- Dana Glacier (California), in the Sierra Nevada, California
- Dana Glacier (Washington), in the North Cascades, Washington
