= Tioga Peak =

Mountain near Yosemite National Park, USA

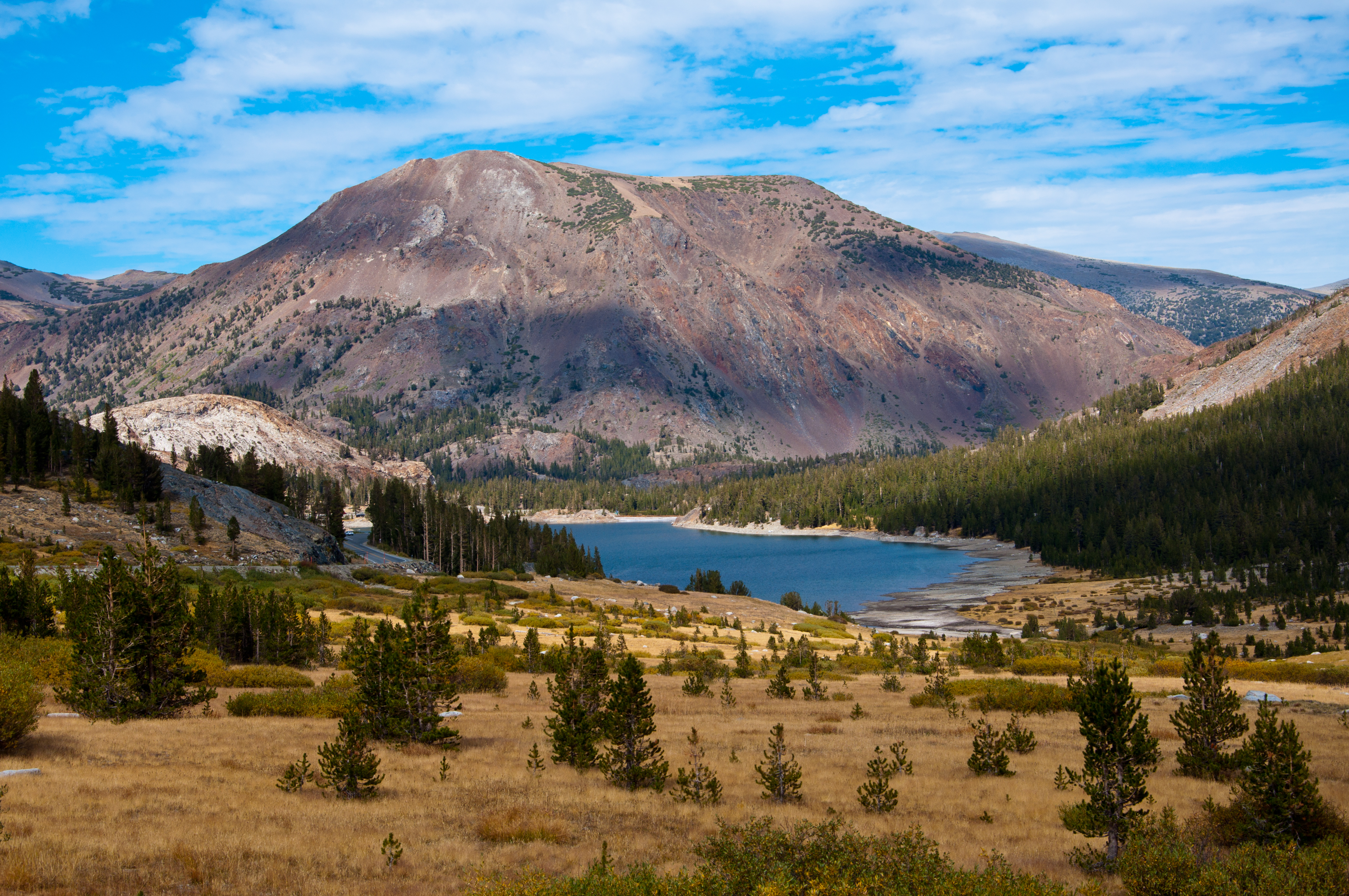
- South aspect, with Tioga Lake

Highest point
- Elevation: 11,526 ft (3,513 m) NAVD 88
- Prominence: 1,006 ft (307 m)
- Isolation: 2.71 mi (4.36 km)
- Coordinates: 37°56′58″N 119°14′47″W

Geography
- Location within California Location within the United States
- Location: Mono County, California, U.S.
- Parent range: Sierra Nevada
- Topo map: USGS Mount Dana

Climbing
- Easiest route: class 2 scrambling

Tioga Peak is located in Mono County, California, approximately two miles outside of Yosemite National Park. It is situated in the Hoover Wilderness on land managed by Inyo National Forest.

== The location of Tioga Peak ==
Tioga Peak is three miles north-northeast of Tioga Pass, at the head of Lee Vining Canyon. Highway 120 traverses its south and east slopes. It is easily accessible, a class 1 to class 2 scramble, from Gardisky Lake. The summit is like a rolling dome. It has some of the best views of the Tioga Pass region.

Both Mount Dana and Tioga Pass are visible from the summit.

Tioga Peak is a rounded peak, made of metamorphic rock.

== Climate ==
Tioga Peak is located in an alpine climate zone. Most weather fronts originate in the Pacific Ocean, and travel east toward the Sierra Nevada mountains. As fronts approach, they are forced upward by the peaks (orographic lift), causing moisture in the form of rain or snowfall to drop onto the range. Precipitation runoff from this mountain drains to Lee Vining Creek and ultimately Mono Lake.

== Gallery ==
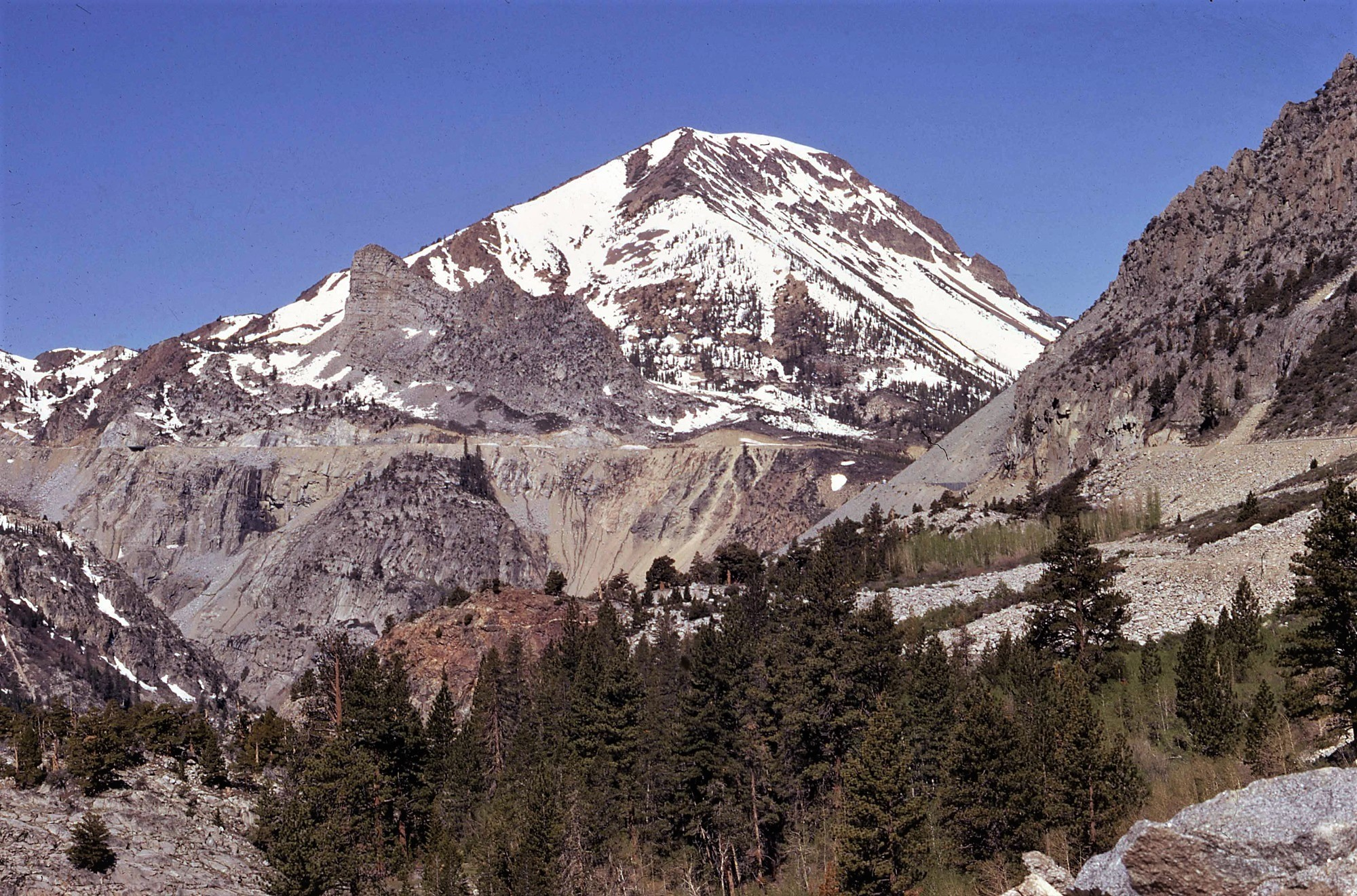
East aspect of Tioga Peak from Lee Vining Canyon

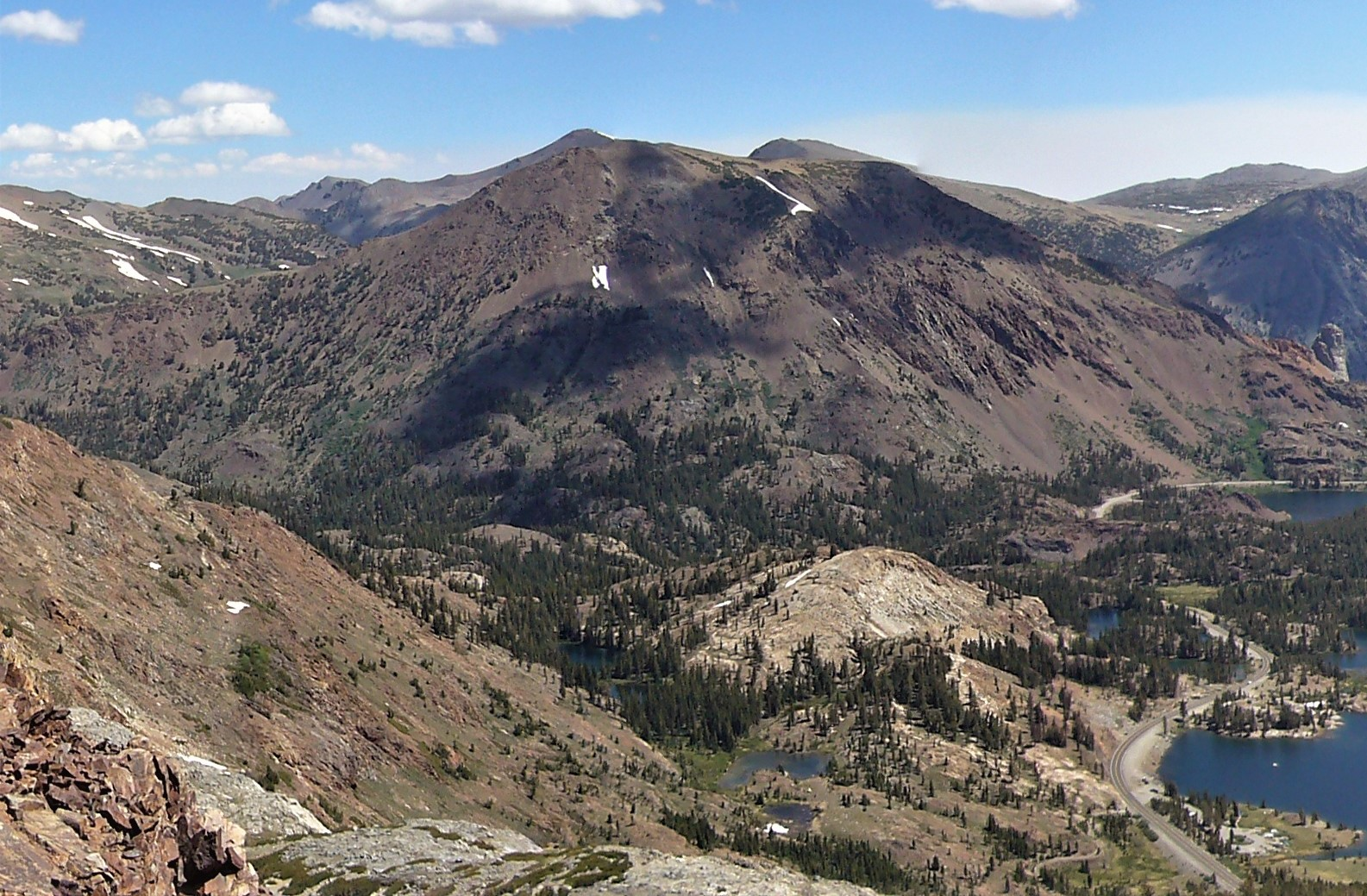
South aspect, from Gaylor Peak

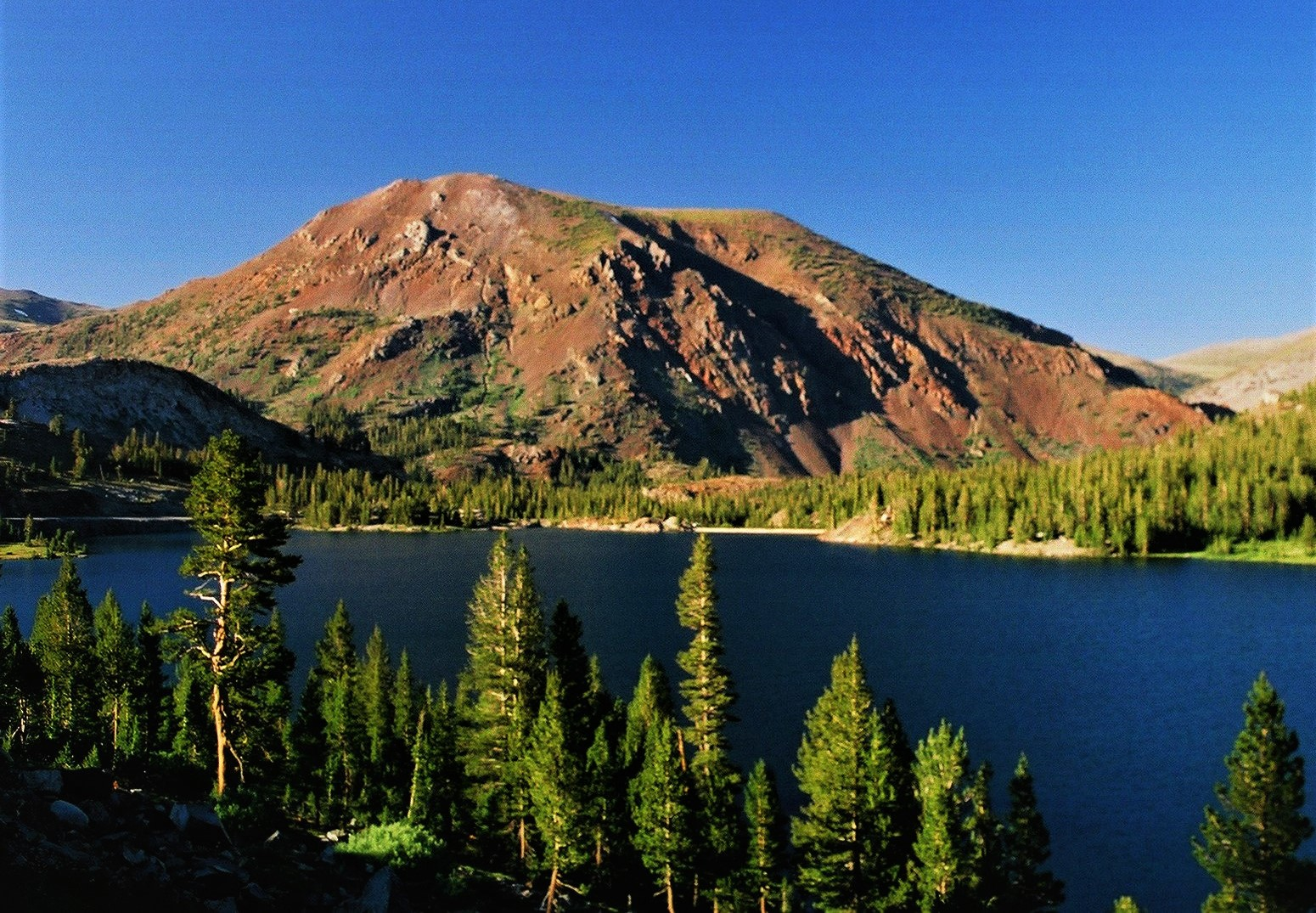
Tioga Peak from Tioga Lake

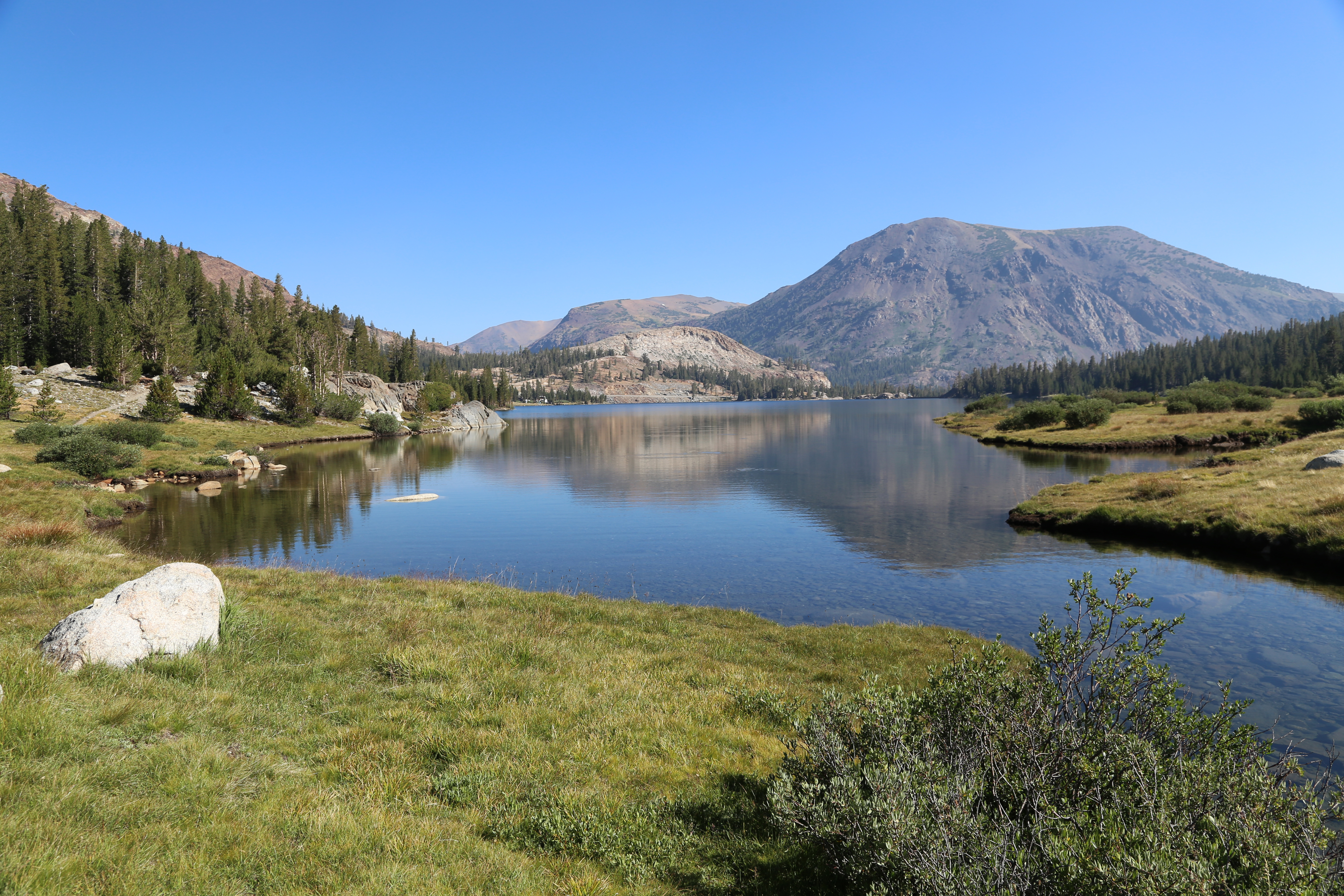
Tioga Peak (right) from Tioga Lake

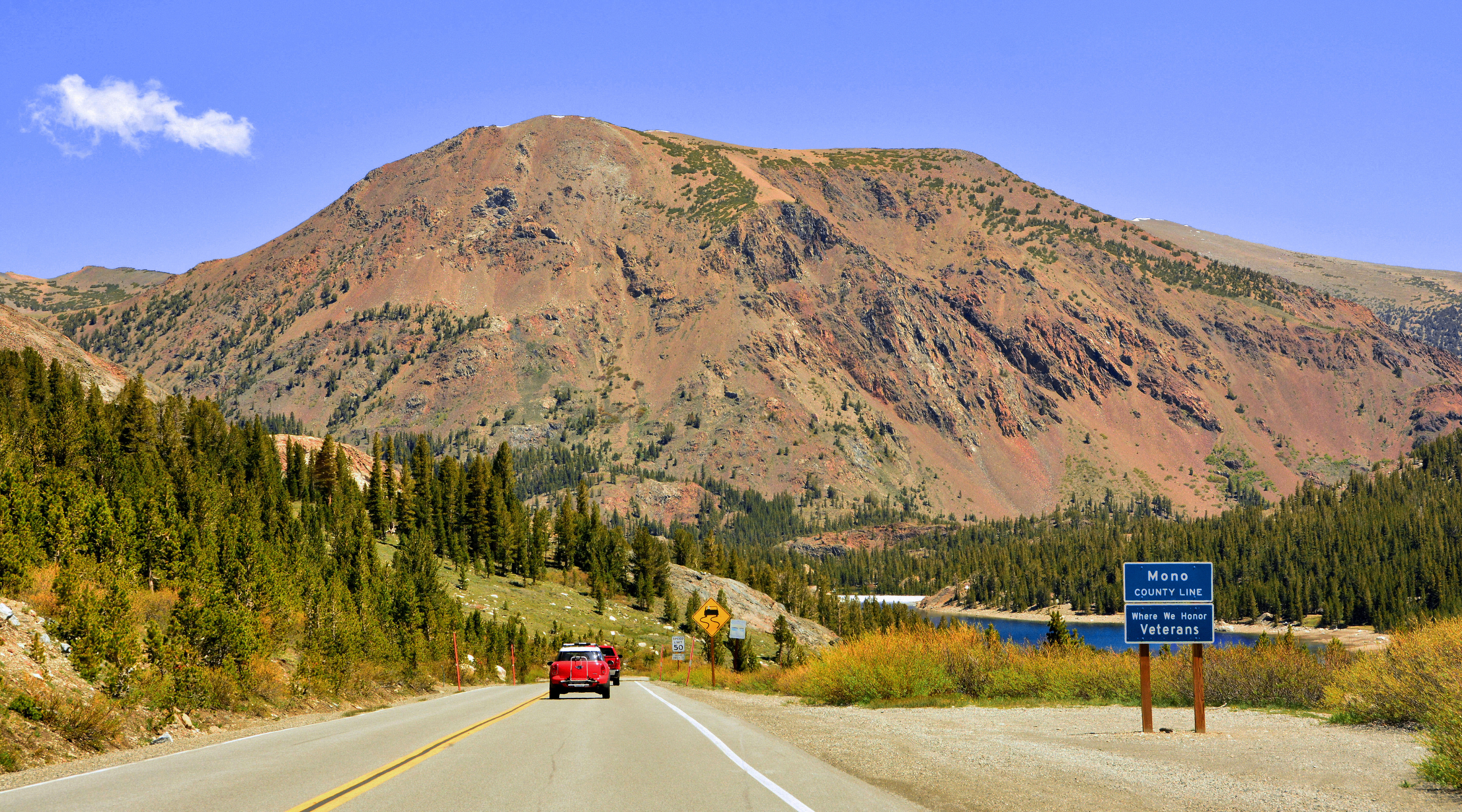
Tioga Peak from Highway 120

== See also ==
- Tioga Crest
- Geology of the Yosemite area

== External links and references ==
- alltrails.com on Tioga Peak
- On hiking Tioga Peak; has a topographic map of the area
