= Bennettville, California =

Former settlement and ghost town in Mono County, California

Coordinates: 37°56′15″N 119°15′38″W

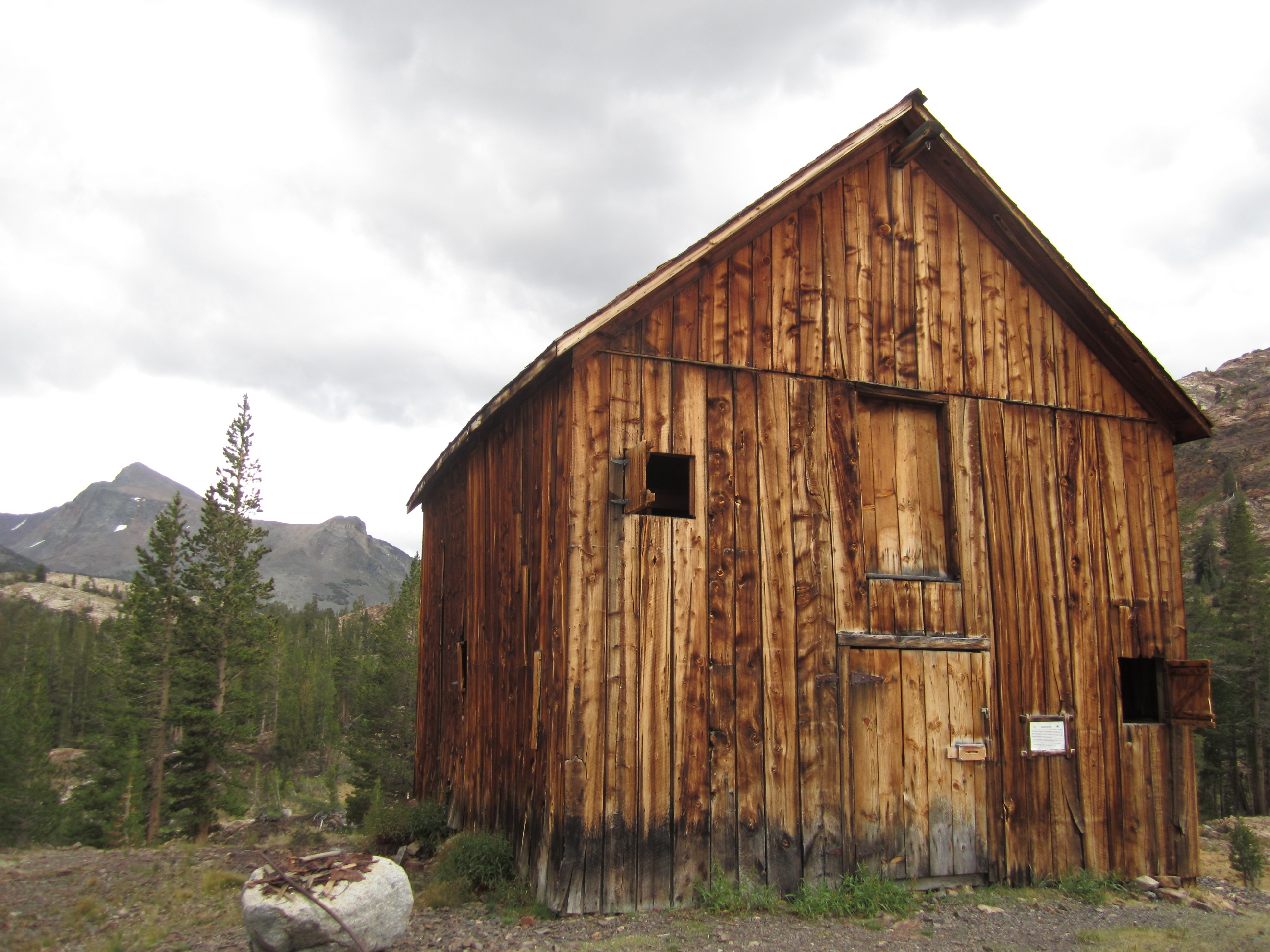
The restored Bennettville bunkhouse in 2014

Bennettville (originally, Bennett City and Tioga) is a former settlement and ghost town in Mono County, California, United States. It was located on Mine Creek, 4 mi (6.4 km) east-southeast of Mount Conness.

== History ==
Mining began at the place in 1860. The first mine was renamed Tioga, when the Great Sierra Consolidated Mining Company bought it. By 1878, there were many mines in the Tioga district. The founders of the town envisioned 50,000 people living there. The Tioga post office operated from 1880 to 1881. The Bennettville post office operated from 1882 to 1884, that were Bennettville's growth era. The name honored Thomas Bennett, a mining company president. The mining company transported tons of equipment to the site and spent $300,000 developing the town, but no silver of consequence was produced. Bennettville was a ghost town by 1890.

== Ruins ==
The remnants of Bennettville consist of two commemorative plaques and two buildings on a hilltop, an assay office and a bunkhouse both of which were restored in 1993. The mining remnants form part of the Great Sierra Mine Historic Site.

== See also ==
- List of ghost towns in California
