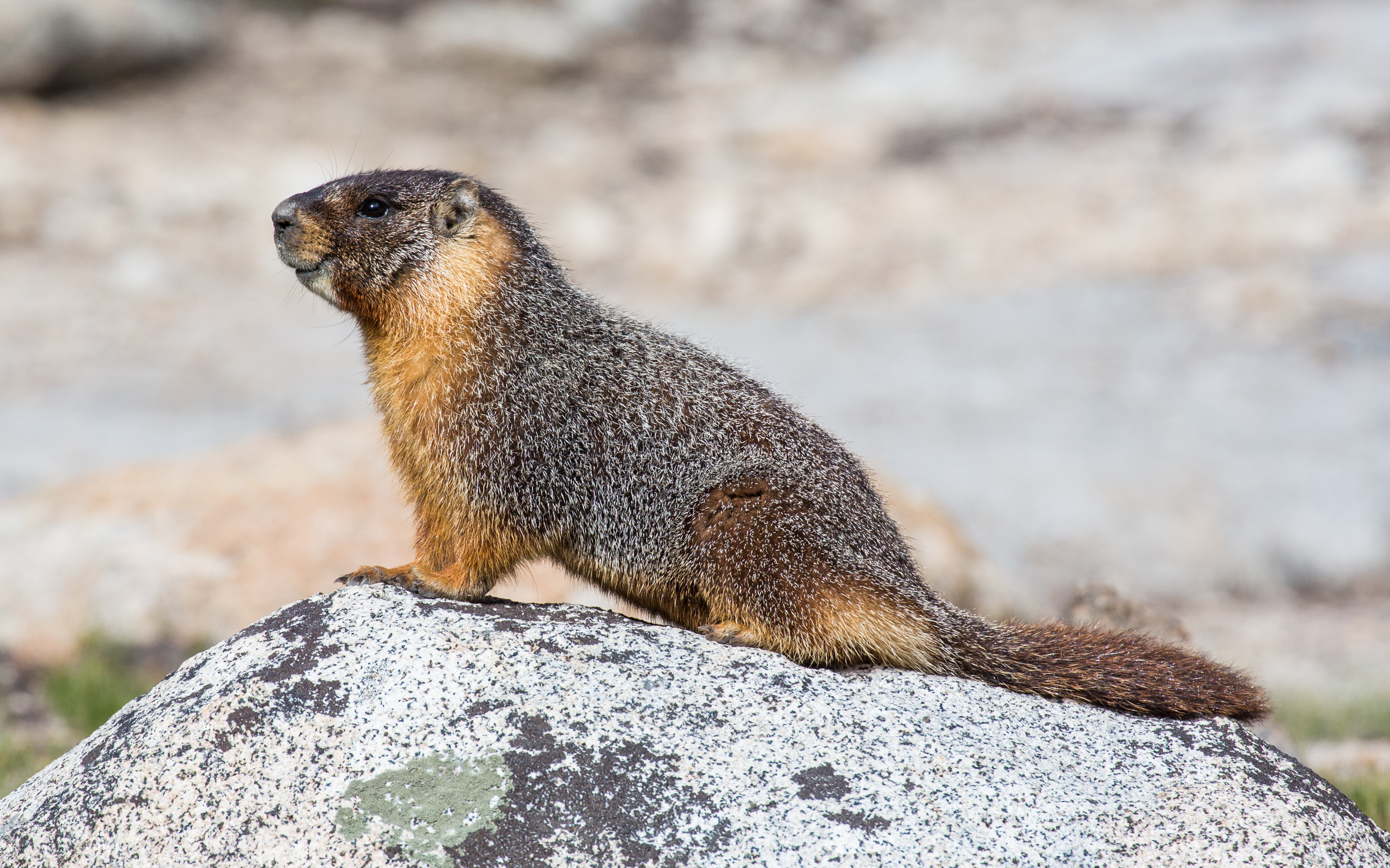
- Yellow-bellied marmot in Tuolumne Meadows, Yosemite National Park

Conservation status
- Least Concern (IUCN 3.1)

Scientific classification
- Kingdom: Animalia
- Phylum: Chordata
- Class: Mammalia
- Order: Rodentia
- Family: Sciuridae
- Genus: Marmota
- Subgenus: Marmota (Petromarmota)
- Species: M. flaviventer

Binomial name
- Marmota flaviventer (Audubon & Bachman, 1841)
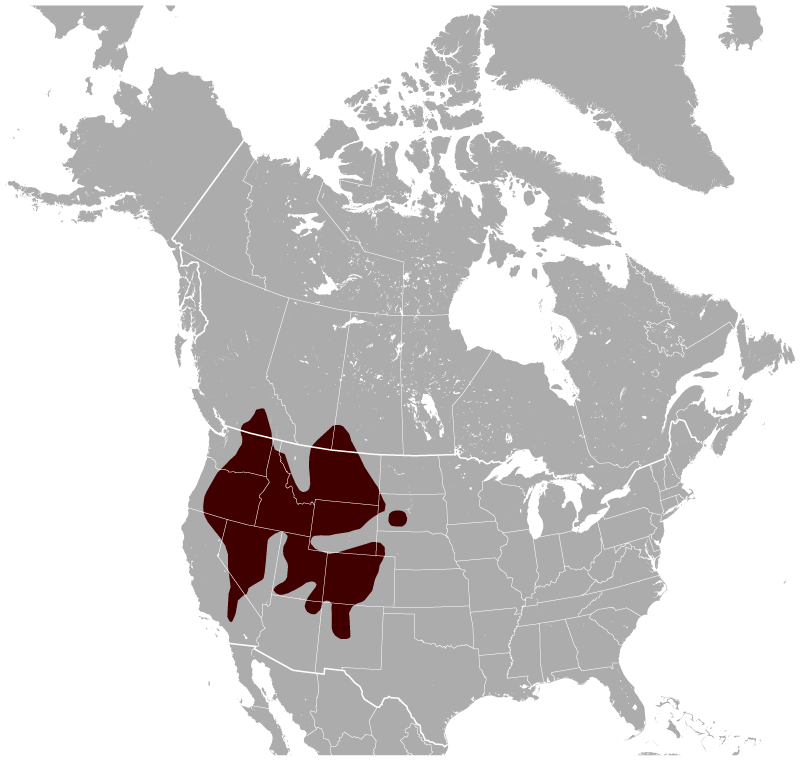
- Yellow-bellied marmot range

= Yellow-bellied marmot =

Species of rodent

The yellow-bellied marmot (Marmota flaviventer), also known as the rock chuck, is a large, stout-bodied ground squirrel in the marmot genus. It is one of fourteen species of marmots, and is native to mountainous and semi-arid regions of southwestern Canada and western United States, including the Rocky Mountains, Sierra Nevada, and the Great Basin, often (but not exclusively) living above 2,000 metres (6,500 feet). The fur is mainly brown, with a dark bushy tail, yellow chest and white patch between the eyes, and they weigh up to approximately 5 kilograms (11 pounds). They are highly social creatures, living in burrows in colonies of up to twenty individuals. They are diurnal and feed on plant material, insects, and bird eggs. They hibernate for approximately eight months starting in September and lasting through the winter. They have an average lifespan of 15 years.

== Description ==
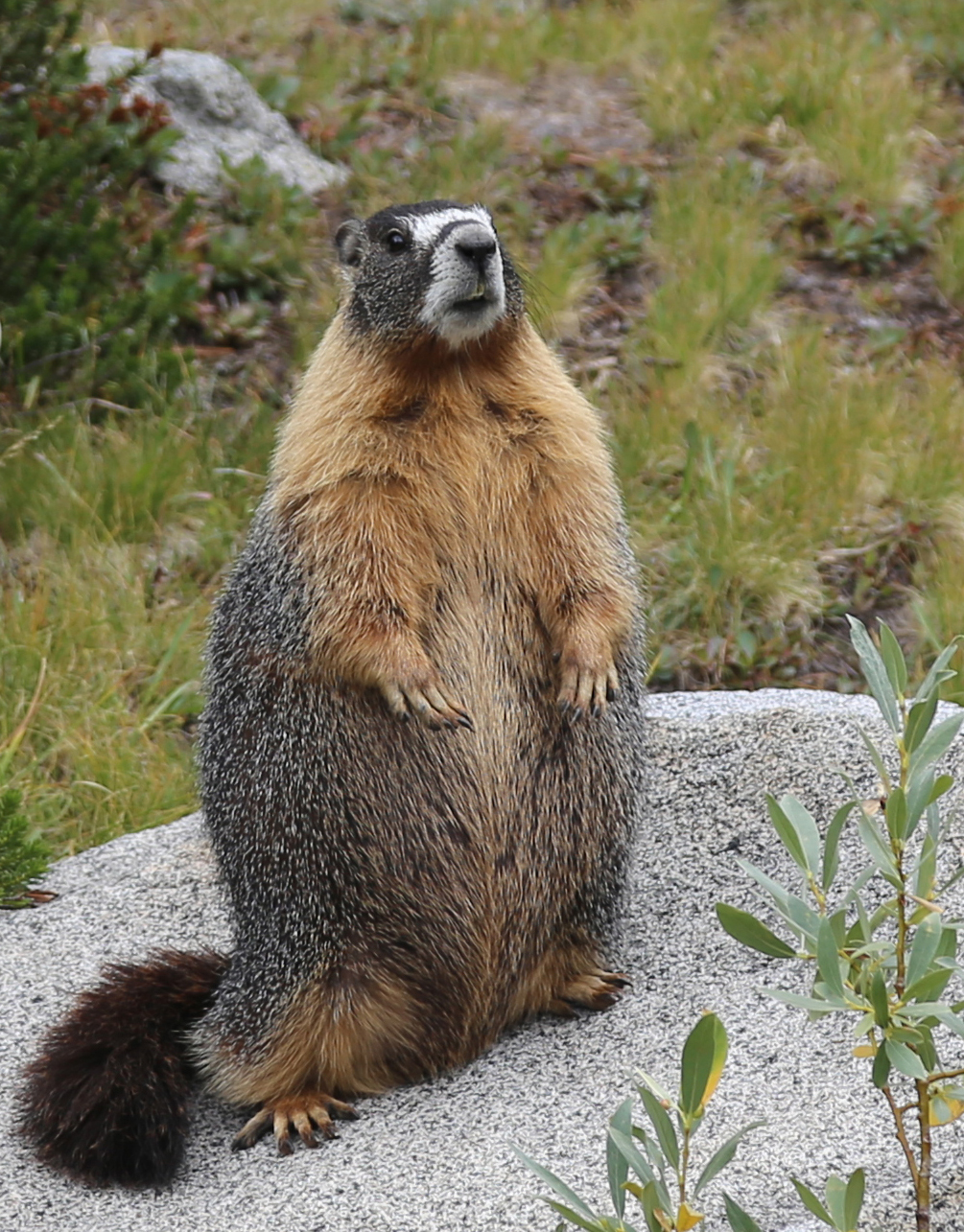
Well-fed individual standing, Ansel Adams Wilderness, California

Yellow-bellied marmots usually weigh from 1.6–5.2 kg (3 lb 8 oz – 11 lb 7 oz) when fully grown, though males typically weigh more than females. The weight fluctuates quite drastically through the year, with the least measured in early spring and the most measured in early autumn. Adult males typically weigh between 3–5 kg (7–11 lb) and adult females typically weigh between 1.6–4 kg (3 1/2–9 lb). They measure from 47–68 cm (18 1/2–27 in) in length, have a short tail measuring 13–21 cm (5–8 1/2 in) with buffy, reddish and black hairs and hindfoot measuring 7–9 cm (3–3 1/2 in).

They have a rather frosty appearance with some of the guard hairs having pale tips with dark bands. The yellow-bellied marmot has a broad and flat skull, dark head, and a dark nose with a white furry patch. The pelage comprises coarse, long outer hairs and woolly, shorter underfurs. They have a brown coat, a white patch of fur on the snout in front of the eyes. Due to the bright yellow fur on their belly, sides of the neck, and throat, they get their scientific and common names. Their ears are small and round, measuring 1.8–2.2 cm (11/16–7/8 in) in length, having a short white muzzle. Their back is reddish-brown in color with grizzled black and light-grey tan. Their feet are yellowish to dark brown to in color. They gain additional fat reserves in the autumn, in preparation for hibernation.

Marmots have an average lifespan of 15 years, which is relatively high given their body size. This is a common occurrence with hibernators, as hibernation has been shown to slow the process of epigenetic ageing.

== Distribution and habitat ==
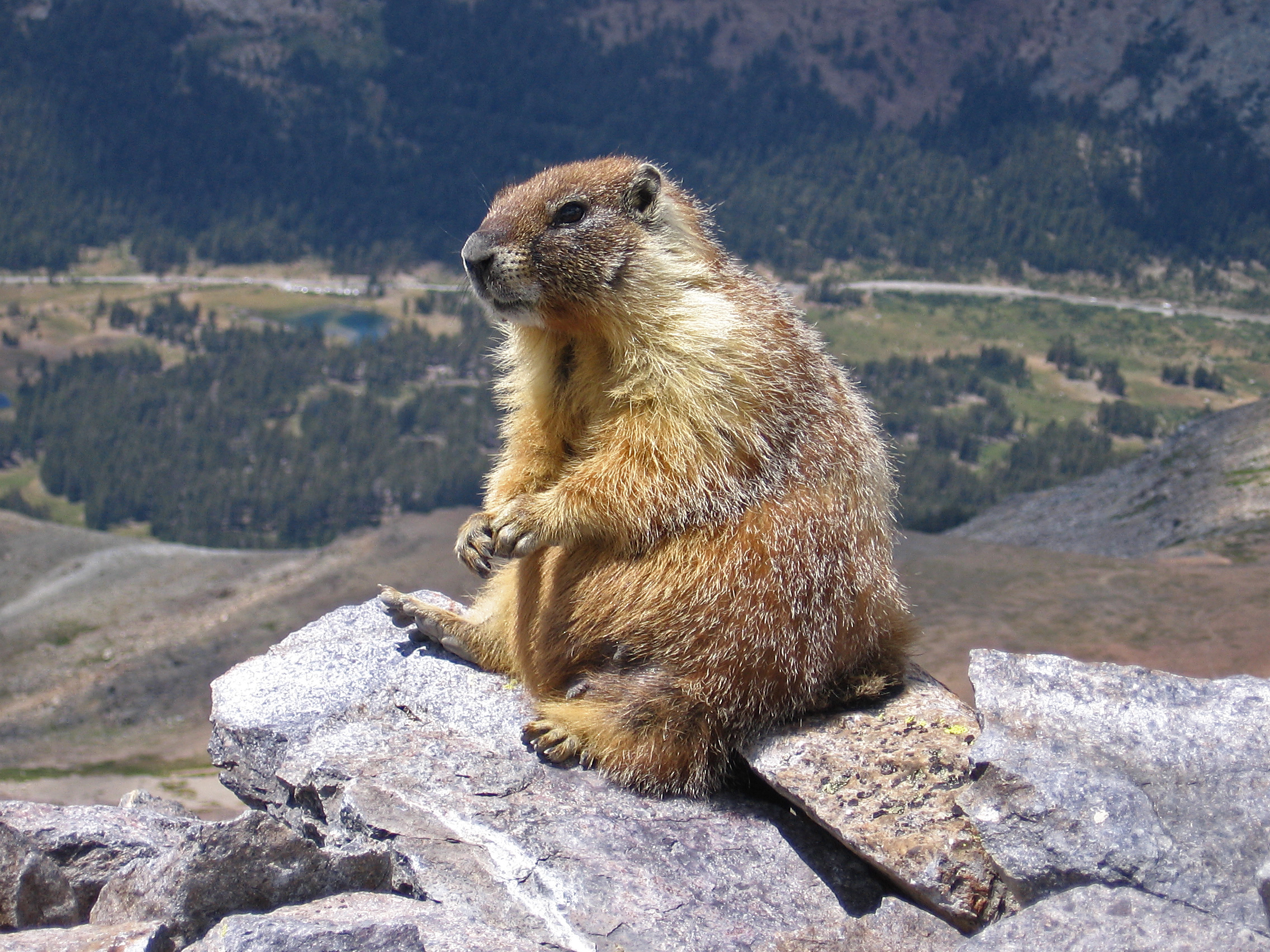
Marmot on Mount Dana, Yosemite National Park

The yellow-bellied marmot lives in southwestern Canada and western United States, including the Rocky Mountains and the Sierra Nevada. Northwards, its range extends into the southern British Columbia and goes eastwards up to the montane and basin regions of Wyoming, eastern Montana, Colorado, and southern Alberta.

Southwards, its range extends into northern New Mexico. It inhabits steppes, meadows, talus fields, and other open habitats, sometimes on the edge of deciduous or coniferous forests. In Colorado, they are found from as low as 1,600 m (5,400 ft) to over 4,300 m (14,000 ft) of elevation. In central and eastern Washington, they are common at low elevations. While not native to the area, they have been found in the San Francisco Bay Area. Naturalists report they travel down out of the Sierra in the engine compartments of vehicles as they are notorious for seeking sweet-smelling radiator fluid.

They are found in valleys, meadows, and foothills, and tend to occupy open areas which are free of vegetation. Their territory is about 2.5 hectares (6 acres) around a number of burrows dug during the summer. Although they sometimes burrow underneath trees and buildings, they typically choose to dig burrows under rocks, as it is less likely to be visible to predators. These predators include foxes, dogs, coyotes, wolves, and eagles. Upon seeing a predator, the yellow-bellied marmot whistles to warn the others in the area, (Note: This gives the Yellow-bellied marmot the nickname "whistle pig".) after which it typically hides in a nearby rock pile until there is no more threat.

== Biology ==
=== Hibernation ===
Yellow-bellied marmots spend about 80% of their lives in their burrows, 60% of which is spent hibernation. They often spend mid-day and night in a burrow as well. These burrows are usually constructed on a slope, such as a hill, mountain, or cliff. The hibernating burrows can be up to 5–7 m (16–23 ft) deep; however, the burrows constructed for daily use are usually only 1 m (3 ft 3 in) deep. Their hibernation period varies on elevation, but it is typically from September to May. Although they hibernate, they do not store food for the winter. Much of their active season is spent accumulating enough fat to survive hibernation. Occasionally, they climb trees and other flora, though they are usually terrestrial.

=== Reproductive behavior ===
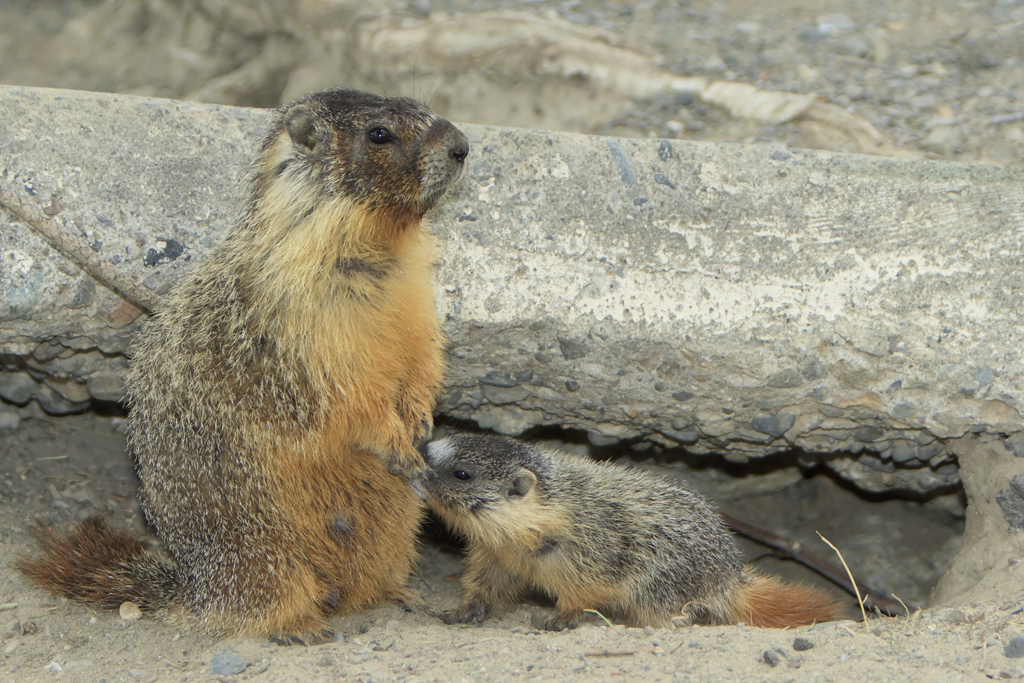
Female with nursing pup, Kamloops, British Columbia

Marmots have a single, 2-week long breeding season annually. Marmots reproduce starting at around two years of age, and may live up to an age of fifteen. They can live alone, in pairs, or in colonies of about ten to twenty individuals. Each male marmot digs a burrow soon after it wakes from hibernation, and starts looking for females to reproduce.

By summer, it may have up to four female mates. Litters usually average three to five offspring per female. Only about half of those pups survive and become yearlings. Marmots have a "harem-polygynous" mating system in which the male reproduces with two or three females at the same time.

Colonies are composed of one or more of these harems. Although typical only the females tend to be monogamous, males can be monogamous in an environment with fewer females. Female offspring tend to stay in the area around their home, while male offspring typically leave when they are yearlings and will defend one or more females.

=== Social behavior ===
Like many marmot species, the yellow-bellied marmot is a highly social animal. Yellow-bellied marmots demonstrate social behaviors including the visiting of burrows, greeting of colony members, and play-fighting. Playing is most common between young, but also frequent between an adult and their young. Marmots communicate with each other through a high pitched whistle. Depending on how sharp the whistle, colony members respond by either observing their surroundings, or returning to their burrows.

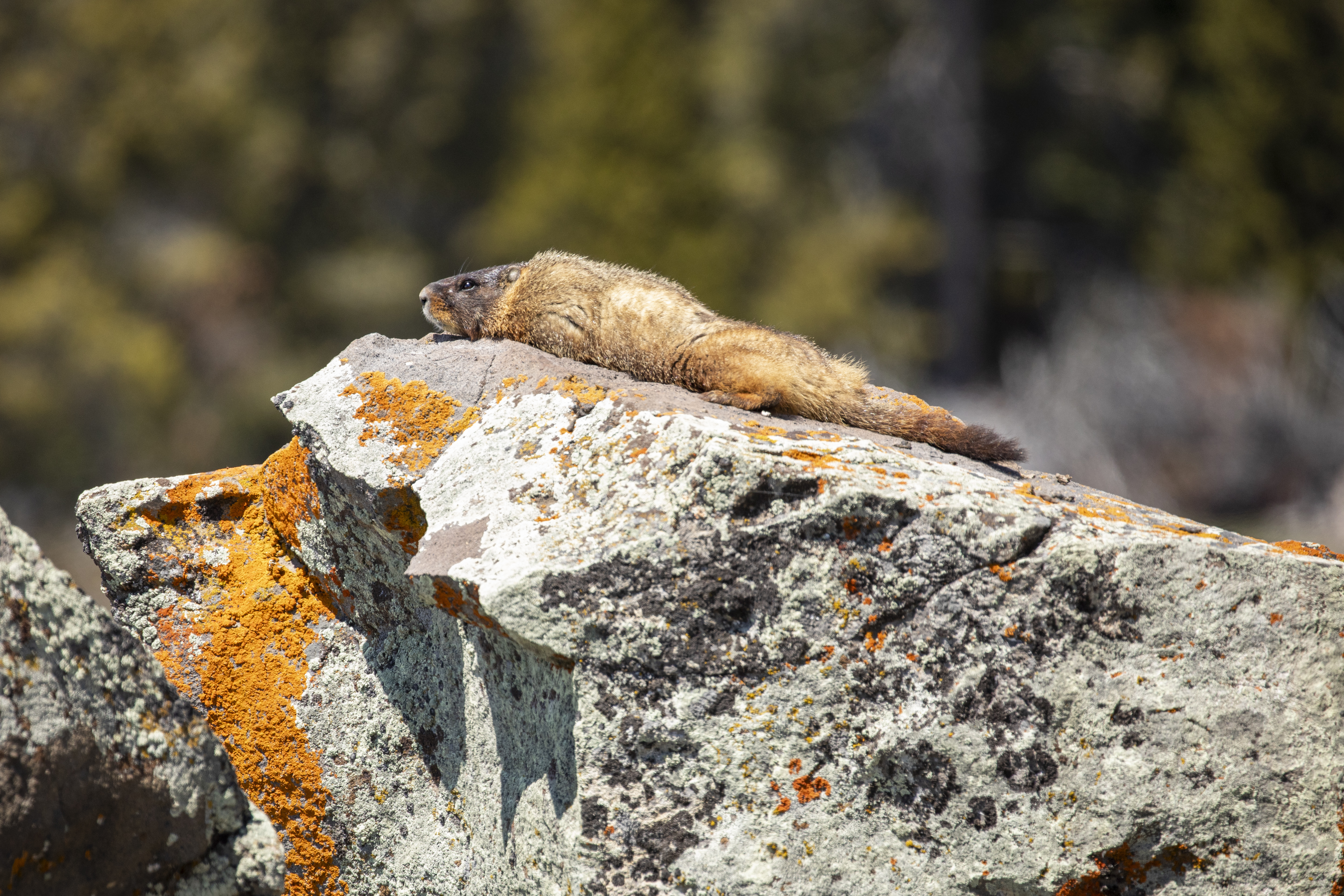
Yellow-bellied marmot sunning on boulder

Daily activities of marmots consist of grooming, sunning, feeding, digging, and residing in their burrows. Marmots typically start their day by emerging from their burrows. They then groom each other and lay in the sun before feeding.

=== Diet ===
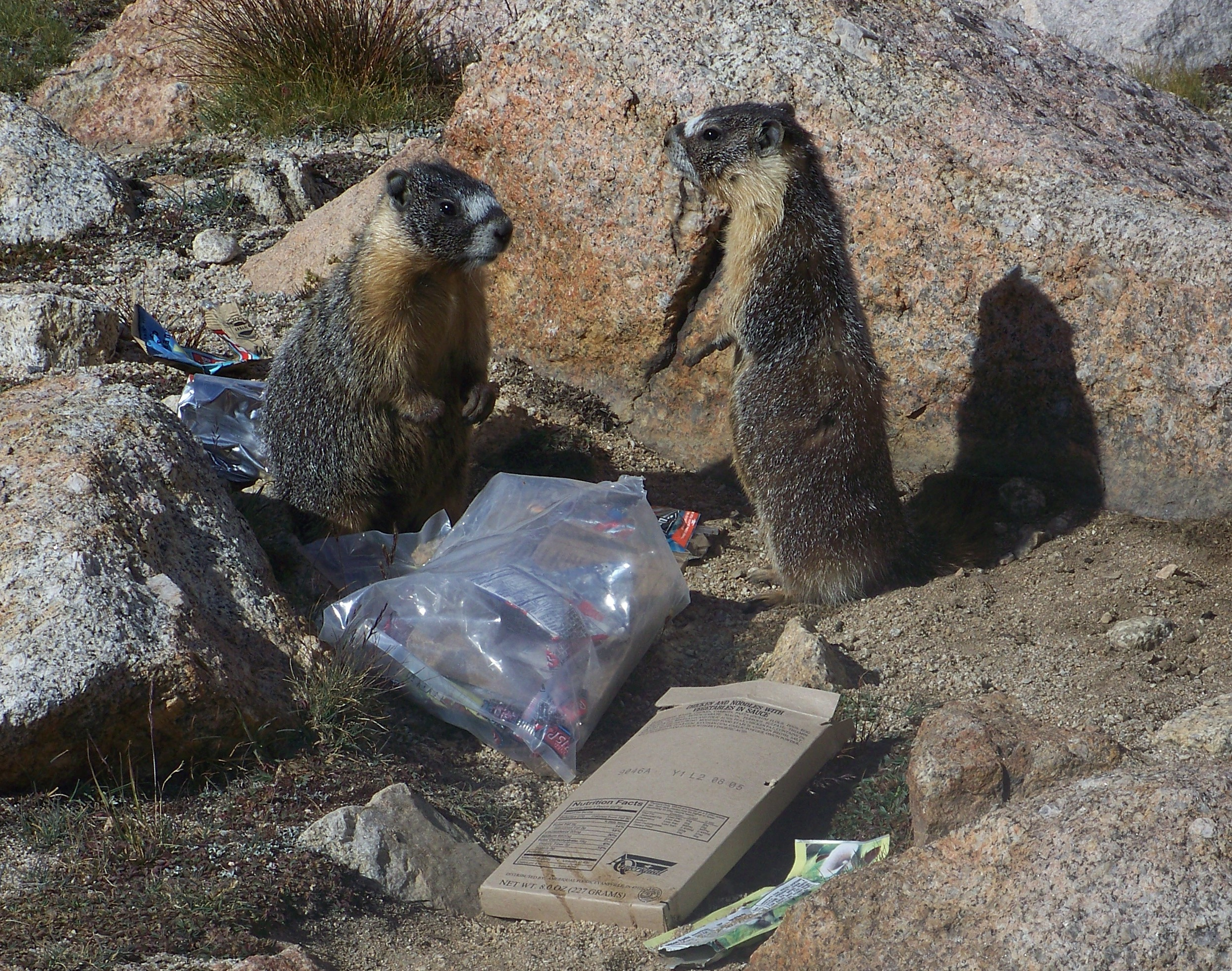
Marmots eating trash left by backpackers at Trail Camp near Mount Whitney, California

Yellow-bellied marmots are diurnal, and are less active during the night. They are omnivores, but generally eat a wide variety of plants, as they are generalist herbivores. They mostly feed on grass, grains, leaves, flowers, legumes, bird eggs, and insects. Occasionally, they are also known to eat fruits and bark of fruit trees. In food choice experiments, yellow-bellied marmots are known to reject plants containing defensive compounds. Due to this, they consume flowers of lupines, larkspur, and columbine, but avoid their shoots containing toxic compounds. Their food choice depends upon the fatty acid and protein concentrations, which are well present in cinquefoil, cow-parsnip, and leaves of dandelion, which are also present in their diet. In late summer, however, grasses, forbs, and seeds make up most of their diet. They also like to feed on alfalfa and clover. They drink less water, as their plant diet mostly serves their water requirements.

== Status and conservation ==
Since 1996, the yellow-bellied marmot has been listed in the least concern category of the IUCN Red List of Endangered species. As there are no major threats to this species and it is protected in several areas throughout its range, there is not much concern for serious conservation efforts to be put in place.

== Climate change ==
Due to their high-altitude environment, marmots are particularly vulnerable to the effects of climate change. Increasing temperatures have shifted the seasonality of marmot behavior, causing hibernation season to end sooner, and breeding season to start sooner. This has resulted in a longer growing season, contributing to an increase in mean body mass and population growth.

Yellow-bellied marmot whistling
