= Tioga Lake =

Lake in the state of California, United States

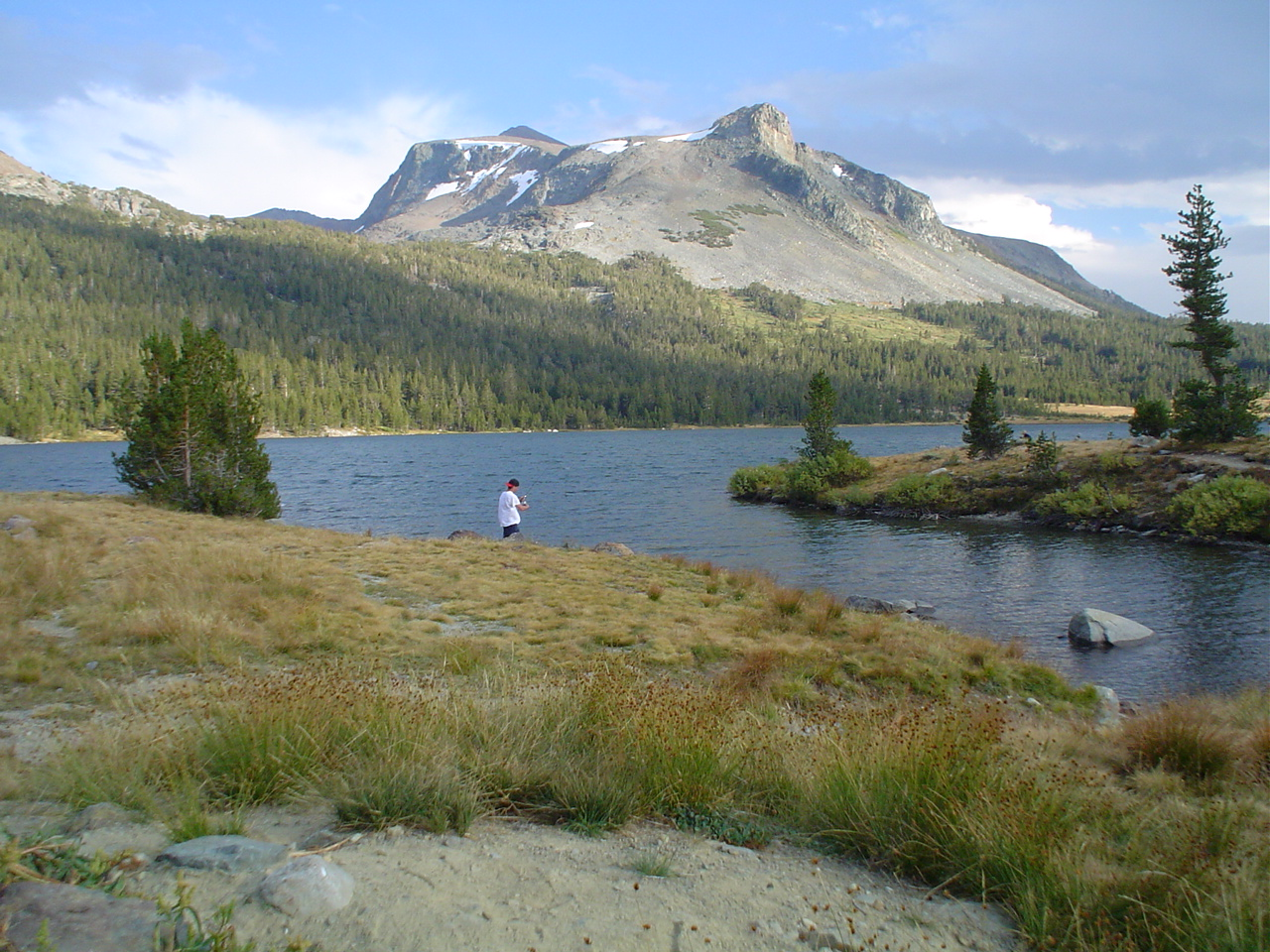
- An angler at the lake, Mount Dana in the background

- Location within California Location within the United States
- Location: Inyo National Forest; Mono County, California
- Coordinates: 37°55′27″N 119°15′07″W
- Type: glacial lake
- Primary outflows: Lee Vining Creek
- Basin countries: United States
- Max. length: 0.65 mi (1.05 km)
- Max. width: 0.25 mi (0.40 km)
- Surface elevation: 9,638 ft (2,938 m)
- References: U.S. Geological Survey Geographic Names Information System: Tioga Lake

Tioga Lake is a small glacial lake in the Inyo National Forest of Mono County, California, about two miles (3 km) north of the Tioga Pass entrance to Yosemite National Park. The lake bed is alongside State Route 120 in the Sierra Nevada of California.

== History ==
Unlike most passes through the Sierra which are named for an individual, tioga is an Iroquois word, meaning "where it forks" or "swift current". Tioga County, New York, is the namesake for the lake. The area is believed to have been settled as early as 10,000 years ago by indigenous peoples. John Muir was among the first Americans to see the area. The next major interest came from the mining and logging industries.

== Recreation ==
The lake offers trout fishing, a picnic area, and a 13-site managed campground. Some of the wildlife in the area are brave enough to approach humans, especially birds and marmots. Occasionally a bobcat or bighorn sheep can be seen, although the latter are particularly shy.

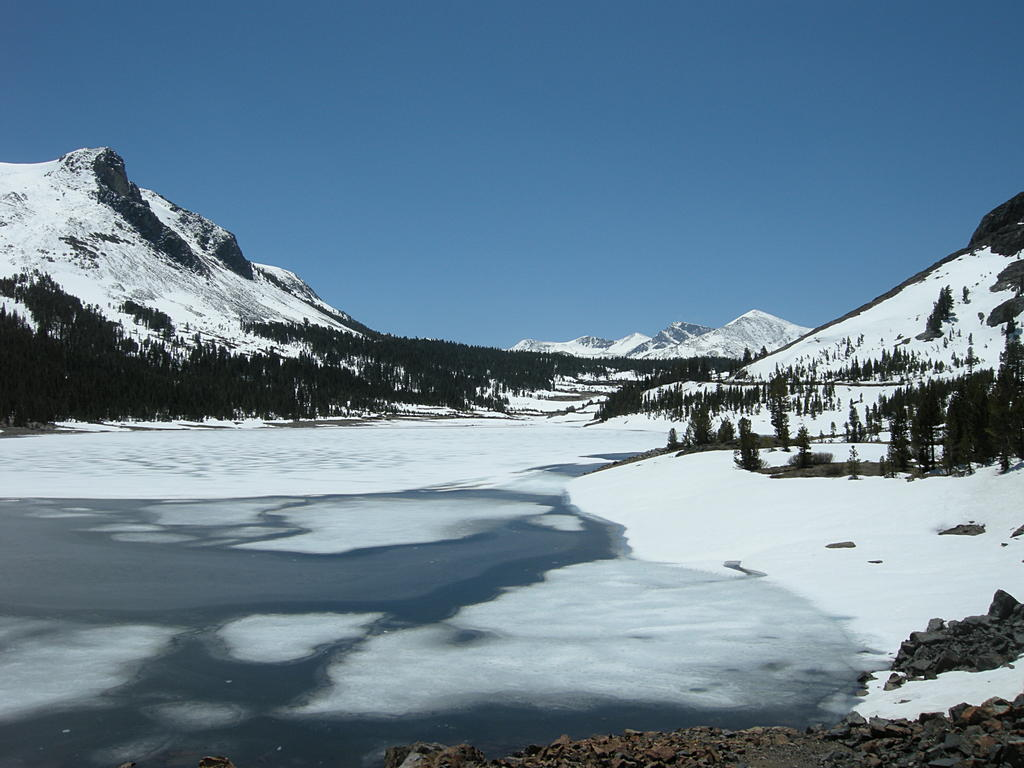
Tioga Lake in spring looking towards Tioga Pass

Because of its inaccessibility, the region and Tioga Lake itself are popular with campers who want to avoid the crowds of Yosemite, photographers, anglers, and nature lovers in general. Birds of prey are more common here, making Tioga Lake and its surroundings popular with bird watchers. Because of the altitude and its location at the crest of a major pass, the weather is extremely unpredictable. Frost is even possible in July.

== See also ==
- List of lakes in California
