= White Mountain (Yosemite) =

Mountain in California, United States

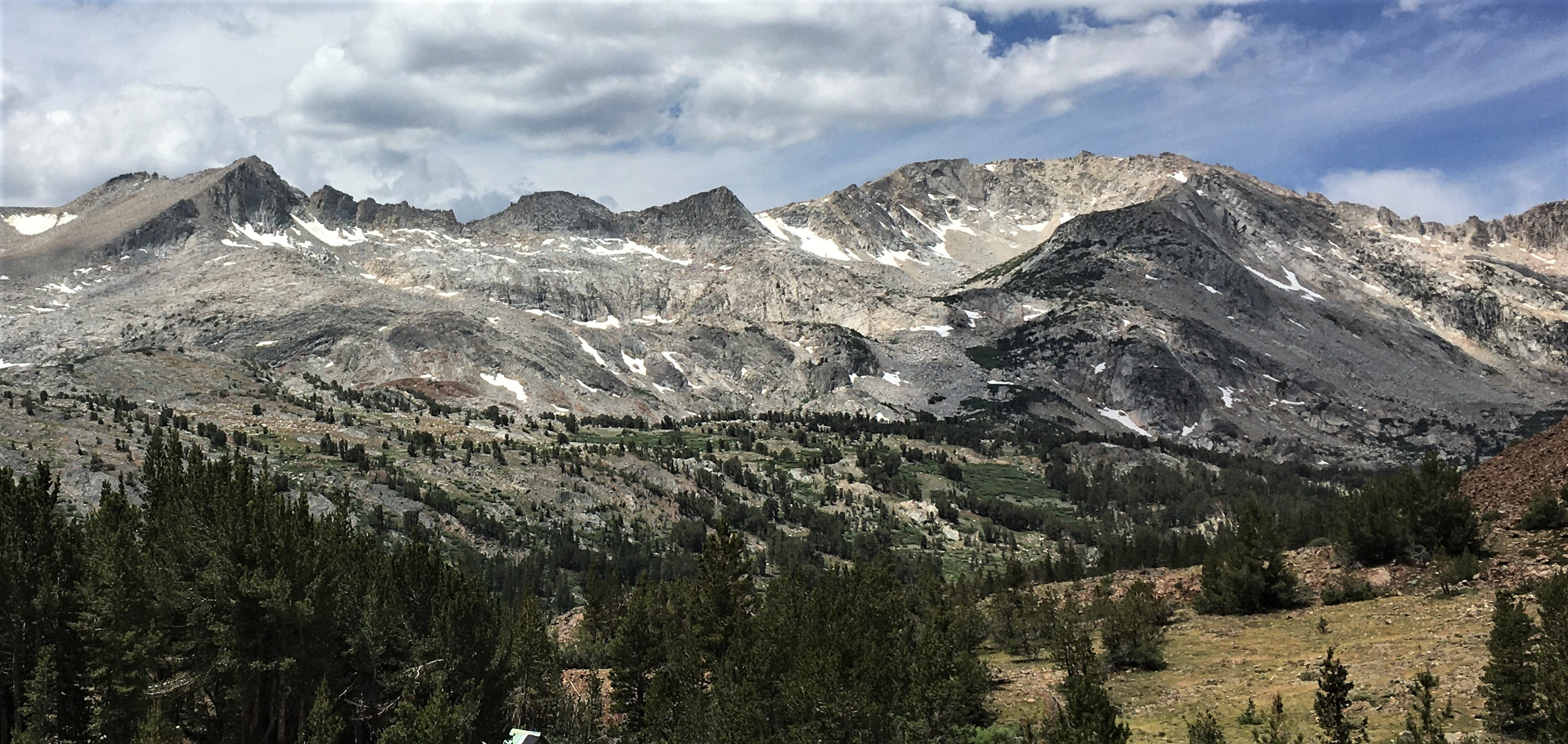
- False White Mountain (left) and White Mountain (right) from the northeast

Highest point
- Elevation: 12,057 ft (3,675 m) NAVD 88
- Prominence: 617 ft (188 m)
- Listing: Highest mountains of Yosemite NP
- Coordinates: 37°56′49″N 119°18′35″W

Geography
- Location within California Location within the United States
- Country: United States
- State: California
- County: Tuolumne
- Protected area: Yosemite National Park
- Parent range: Ritter Range, Sierra Nevada

Climbing
- First ascent: 1917 by Walter L. Huber

White Mountain is a mountain in the northern part of Yosemite National Park. White Mountain is near both Mount Conness and Ragged Peak. It is the 18th highest mountain within the park's boundaries.

White Mountain should not be confused with two other similarly named peaks in California: False White Mountain, also in Yosemite, and White Mountain Peak, in the White Mountains of Inyo County and the third-highest mountain in California.

== On climbing White Mountain ==
White Mountain is a class 2 climb.
