= Dana Glacier (California) =

Glacier in California, United States

- Interactive map of Dana Glacier
- Type: Mountain glacier
- Location: Mount Dana, Mono County, California, United States
- Coordinates: 37°54′02″N 119°13′04″W
- Terminus: talus
- Status: retreating

The Dana Glacier is located inside a northeast facing cirque located east of the 13,061 feet (3,981 m) Mount Dana on the eastern border of Yosemite National Park, California. It is very close to Tioga Pass and Highway 120. The glacier occupies the very steep, shaded western slope of the cirque at around 11,500 to 11,800 feet (3,500–3,600 m), although a part of it reaches up to 12,500 feet (3,800 m) (Dana Couloir). Repeat photography comparing images taken in 1883 with those from 2004 demonstrate that the glacier has retreated substantially in that period.

== See also ==
- List of glaciers in the United States
