= Tioga Pass =

Mountain pass in the American state of California

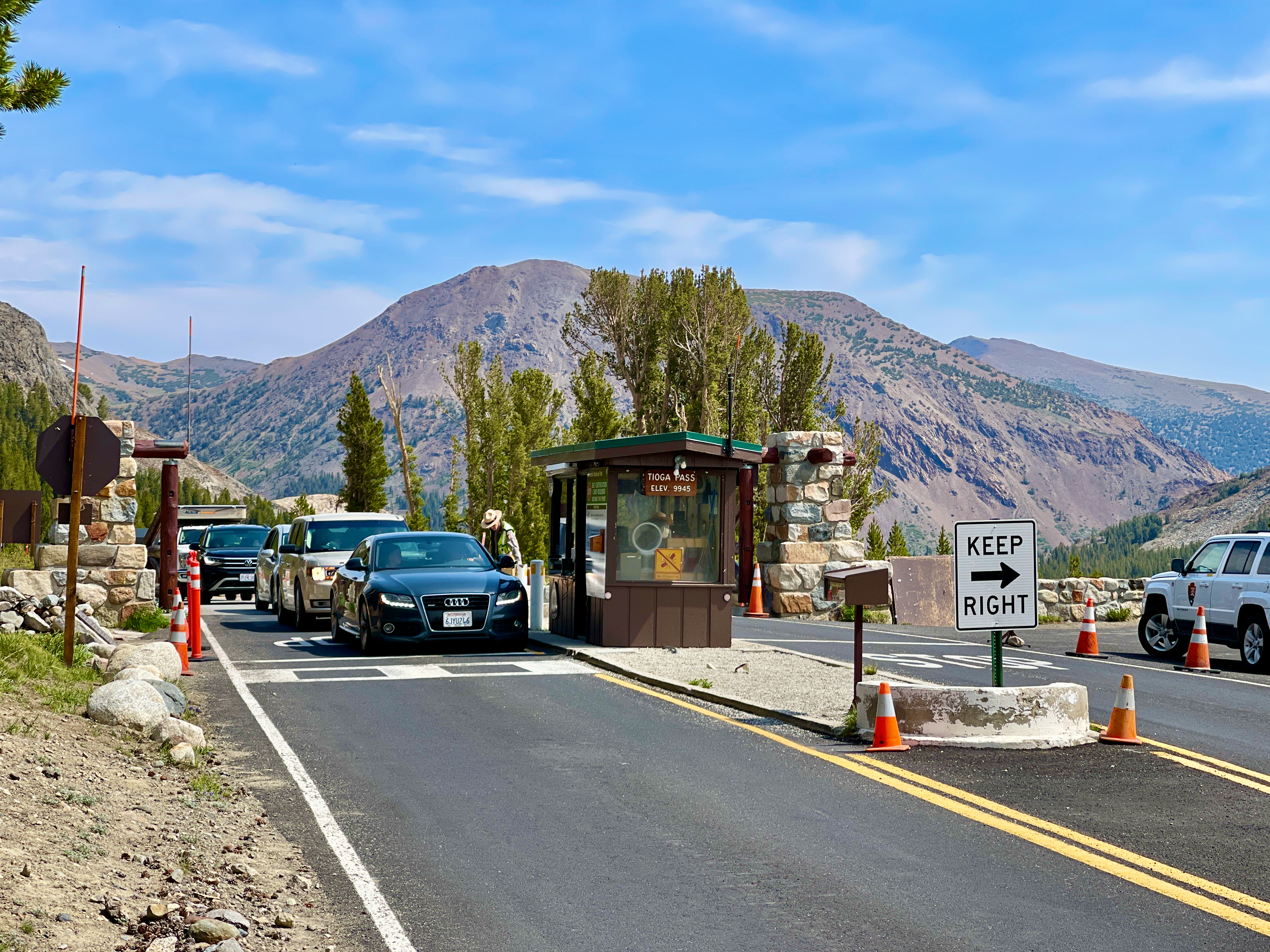
- The Tioga Pass Entrance Station to Yosemite National Park

- Location within California
- Elevation: 9,945 ft (3,031 m)
- Traversed by: SR 120

Location
- Location: Mono / Tuolumne counties, California, United States
- Range: Sierra Nevada
- Coordinates: 37°54′40″N 119°15′29″W
- Topo map: USGS Tioga Pass

Tioga Pass is a mountain pass in the Sierra Nevada mountain range of California. State Route 120 runs through it, and serves as the eastern entry point for Yosemite National Park, at the Tioga Pass Entrance Station. It is the highest elevation highway pass in California and in the Sierra Nevada at an elevation of 9,945 ft (3,031 m). Mount Dana is to the east of the pass, and Gaylor Peak to the west.

== Etymology ==
Tioga Pass is named after Tioga Mine, whose name came from the Tioga River in Pennsylvania and New York: Tioga is an Iroquois and Mohawk term meaning "where it forks".

== Description ==
This pass, like many other passes in the Sierra Nevada, has a gradual approach from the west and drops off to the east dramatically, losing more than 3,000 ft (910 m) by the time the road reaches U.S. Route 395.

The pass is subject to winter closure due to high snowfall, normally from around the end of October until the end of May the following year, though these dates are subject to considerable variation. In heavy snow years, the road has closed in early October, and has remained closed as late as late July. In light snow years, the road may remain open until December and open as early as April.

Tioga Pass is the most direct route from Bishop or Mammoth Lakes, California to Fresno, Merced, and Stockton. There are four highway passes to the north, between Yosemite and Lake Tahoe, but none to the south for about 200 mi (320 km), until Sherman Pass in southern Tulare County.

The pass is on the Great Basin Divide, which demarcates the Great Basin, which is the largest contiguous area of endorheic basins in North America.

== Recreation ==
There are several trailheads into the Yosemite backcountry which begin at Tioga Pass, including the trail to the Gaylor Lakes to the west/northwest, and the trail to the summit of Mount Dana. Dana Meadows is immediately south of the pass alongside the highway, as the pass itself is roughly angled north–south as opposed to east–west. Dana Meadows contains several small lakes.

A popular recreation and camping area exists just north of the summit of the pass at Tioga Lake. It is in the Inyo National Forest.

Less than 7 miles to the southwest of the pass, inside Yosemite National Park, is Tuolumne Meadows. The Pacific Crest Trail passes through, and it crosses the highway here.

== Wildlife ==
Some of the wildlife in the area include birds of prey, marmots, bobcats, and occasionally bighorn sheep can be seen.

== Controversy ==
The opening date of Tioga Pass each year is the subject of considerable speculation among local residents and cyclists. The pass provides an important seasonal transportation link between communities in the Eastern Sierra and cities on the western side of the Sierra Nevada. Before the road is opened to motorized traffic, Yosemite National Park typically allows one to two days of access for cyclists only, drawing riders from across the United States to experience the high-elevation route without vehicle traffic.

Yosemite National Park’s communication regarding snowplowing progress and anticipated opening dates has at times been criticized as limited and infrequent. In response, several community-run websites, including Tioga Watch and Is Tioga Open, compile publicly available information—such as telemetered weather station data, satellite imagery, and reports from visitors and local employees—to provide informal updates on road conditions and the likely opening timeline when official updates are sparse.

== See also ==
- Sonora Pass
- List of mountain passes in California
- Tioga Lake
- Tioga Peak
