= Tioga Pass Entrance Station =

- U.S. National Register of Historic Places
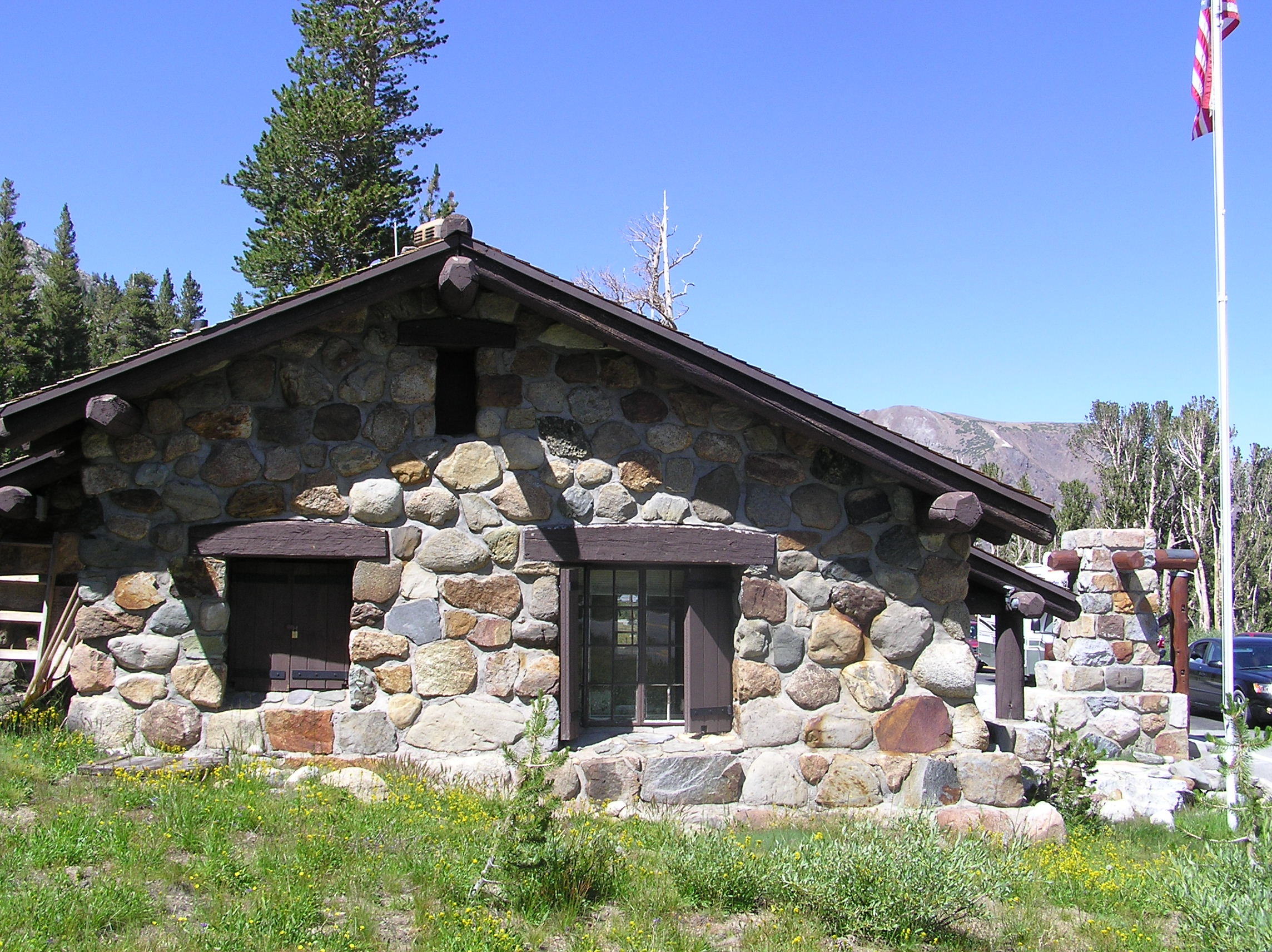

- Location within California Location within the United States
- Nearest city: Lee Vining, California
- Coordinates: 37°54′39″N 119°15′27″W
- Area: 0.2 acres (0.081 ha)
- Built: 1931
- Architect: National Park Service
- Architectural style: Rustic
- NRHP reference No.: 78000372
- Added to NRHP: December 14, 1978

The Tioga Pass Entrance Station is the primary entrance for travelers entering Yosemite National Park from the east on the Tioga Pass Road. Open only during the summer months, the entrance station consists of two historical buildings, a ranger station and a comfort station, built in 1931 and 1934 respectively. Both are rustic stone structures with peeled log roof structures, and are examples of the National Park Service rustic style employed at the time by the National Park Service. Two log gate structures that had been removed since the site's original construction were rebuilt in 1999; the stone piers that supported them remain. The use of stone at Tioga Pass set a precedent for the extensive employment of stone construction in other park buildings in the Yosemite high country. Civilian Conservation Corps workers assisted in the entrance station's construction.

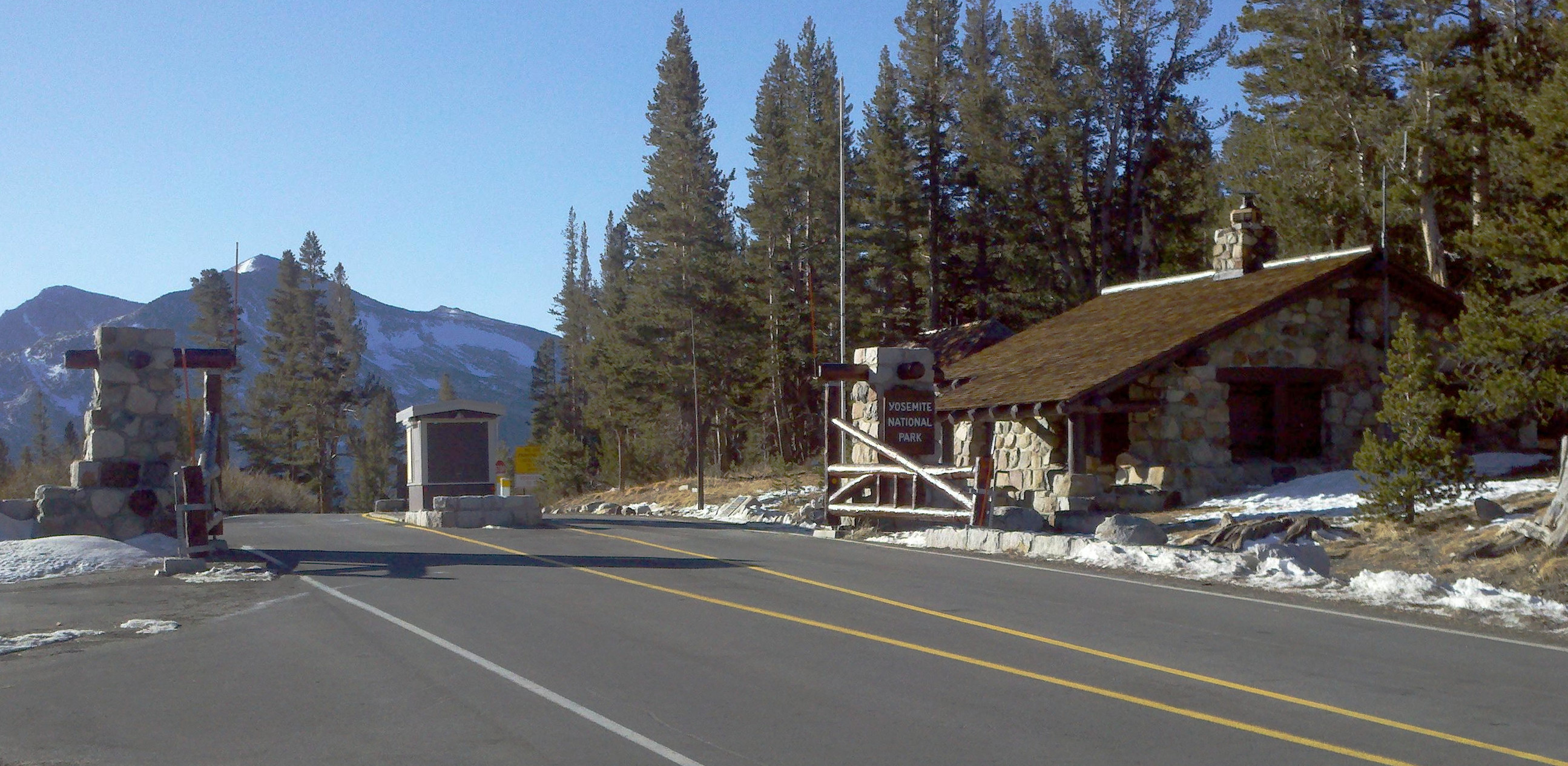
Tioga Pass entrance station

The ranger station is a stone building, about 28 feet (8.5 m) square, set into the slope of the hillside with a porch extending across most of the front. The interior features a lobby space with a substantial stone fireplace, along with living quarters consisting of a bedroom, bath and kitchen. The masonry is oversized, with similarly heavy log porch and roof framing. Window lintels are single massive shaped timbers. The bases of the walls step outward in a reverse corbel. The roof is a simple gable. The comfort station is of similar design, with battered (sloping) stone walls, measuring about 11 feet (3.4 m) by 26 feet (7.9 m), with a steeper roof pitch and partly hipped gables at the ends.

The Tioga Pass Entrance Station was listed on the National Register of Historic Places on December 14, 1978.
