= Gaylor Peak =

Mountain summit in California

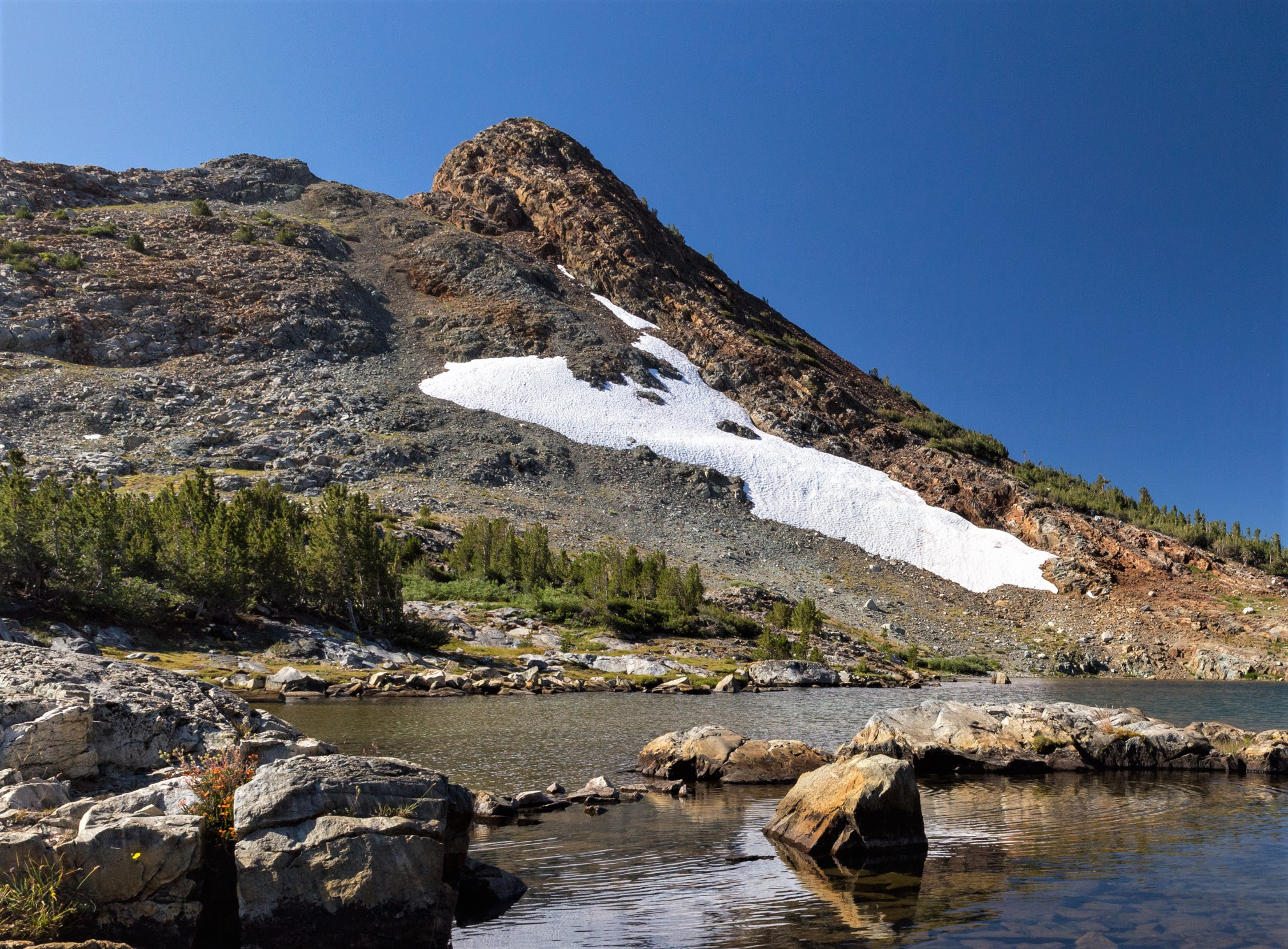
- North aspect, from Upper Gaylor Lake

Highest point
- Elevation: 11,004 ft (3,354 m)
- Prominence: 484 ft (148 m)
- Parent peak: False White Mountain (12,002 ft)
- Isolation: 1.95 mi (3.14 km)
- Listing: Vagmarken Club Sierra Crest List
- Coordinates: 37°55′09″N 119°15′56″W

Naming
- Etymology: Andrew Jack Gaylor

Geography
- Location within California Location within the United States
- Location: Yosemite National Park; Tuolumne / Mono counties California, United States
- Parent range: Sierra Nevada
- Topo map: USGS Tioga Pass

Geology
- Mountain type: Fault block
- Rock type: Metamorphic rock

Climbing
- Easiest route: class 2

Gaylor Peak is an 11,004-foot (3,354-meter) mountain summit located on the crest of the Sierra Nevada mountain range in northern California, United States. The peak is positioned on the boundary between Yosemite National Park and the Inyo National Forest, and it also lies on the border between Mono County and Tuolumne County. The peak rises prominently above Tioga Pass and Tioga Lake, with a notable topographic relief, as the summit stands approximately 1,400 feet (430 meters) above the lake within a distance of one-half mile (0.80 km).

Gaylor Peak is a popular hiking destination, particularly during the summer months, due to its accessibility. Hikers can reach the summit via the Gaylor Lakes Trail, a two-mile route that begins at State Route 120, which runs along the eastern base of the peak. The peak's geological composition consists of metamorphic rock, and it is classified as a fault block mountain.

The peak is named after Andrew Jack Gaylor, though detailed historical information about the naming is limited. The mountain is listed on the Vagmarken Club's Sierra Crest List, recognizing notable summits in the region.

The easiest route to the summit is a Class 2 hike on the Yosemite Decimal System scale, which indicates that the climb involves simple scrambling without the need for specialized climbing equipment.

== History ==
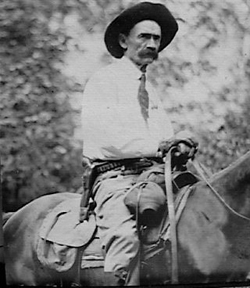
Jack Gaylor

The toponym of this mountain was officially adopted by the United States Board on Geographic Names to honor Andrew Jack Gaylor, one of the first rangers in Yosemite National Park. Gaylor died from a heart attack on April 19, 1921, while on patrol in the park, after serving 14 years with the National Park Service.

Prior to the official naming, early prospectors referred to the peak as "Tioga Hill." The Great Sierra Mine Historic Site is located approximately one-half mile north of Gaylor Peak.

== Climate ==
Gaylor Peak is located in an alpine climate zone. Most weather fronts originate over the Pacific Ocean and move eastward toward the Sierra Nevada mountains. As these fronts approach, they are forced upward by the peaks through a process known as orographic lift, which causes the moisture to condense and fall as precipitation, either as rain or snow, depending on the season.

Precipitation runoff from Gaylor Peak flows westward into Gaylor Lakes and then into the Dana Fork of the Tuolumne River. To the east, runoff drains into Tioga Lake, eventually feeding into Lee Vining Creek and ultimately reaching Mono Lake.

== Gallery ==
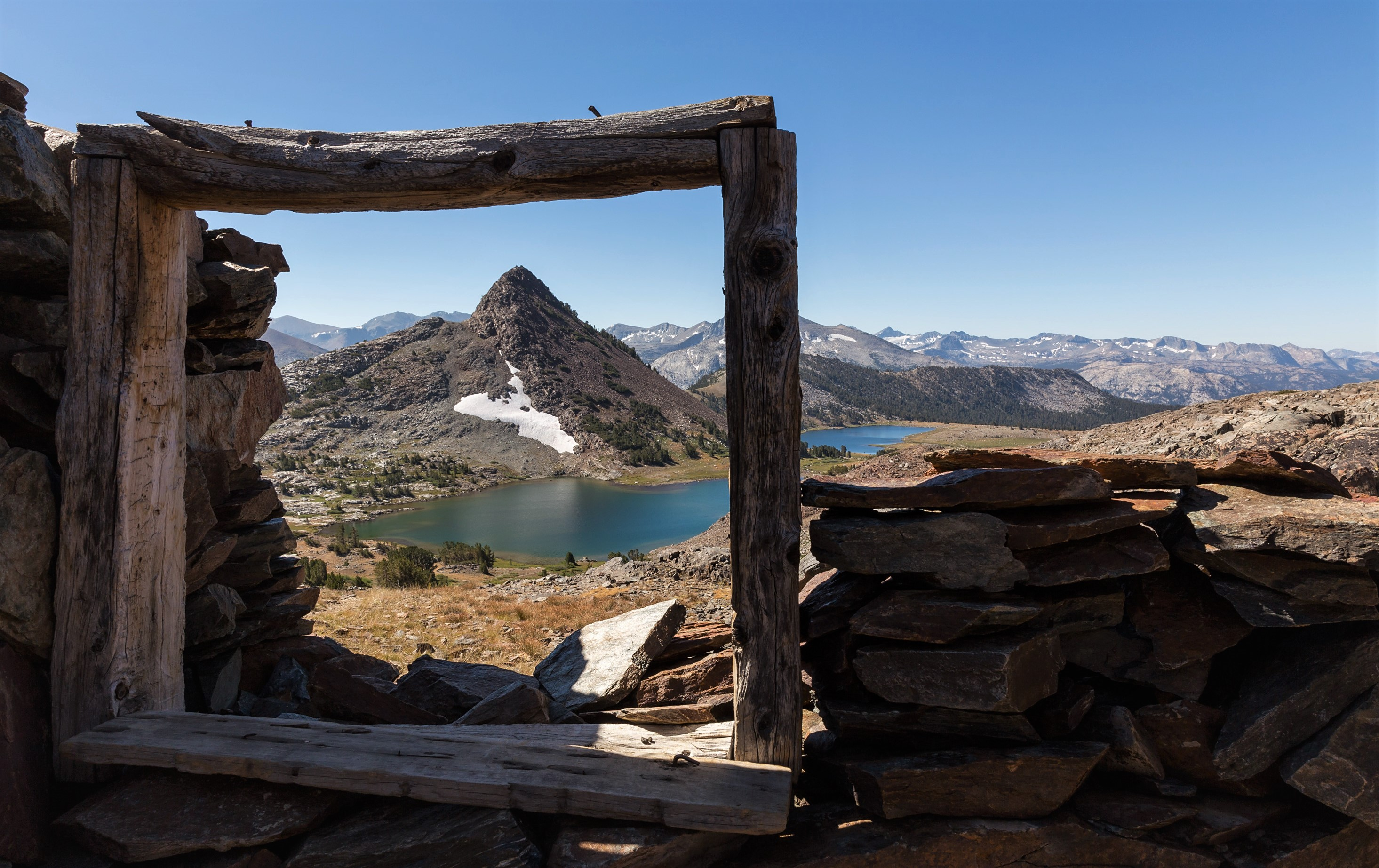
Gaylor Peak framed, from Great Sierra Mine Historic Site

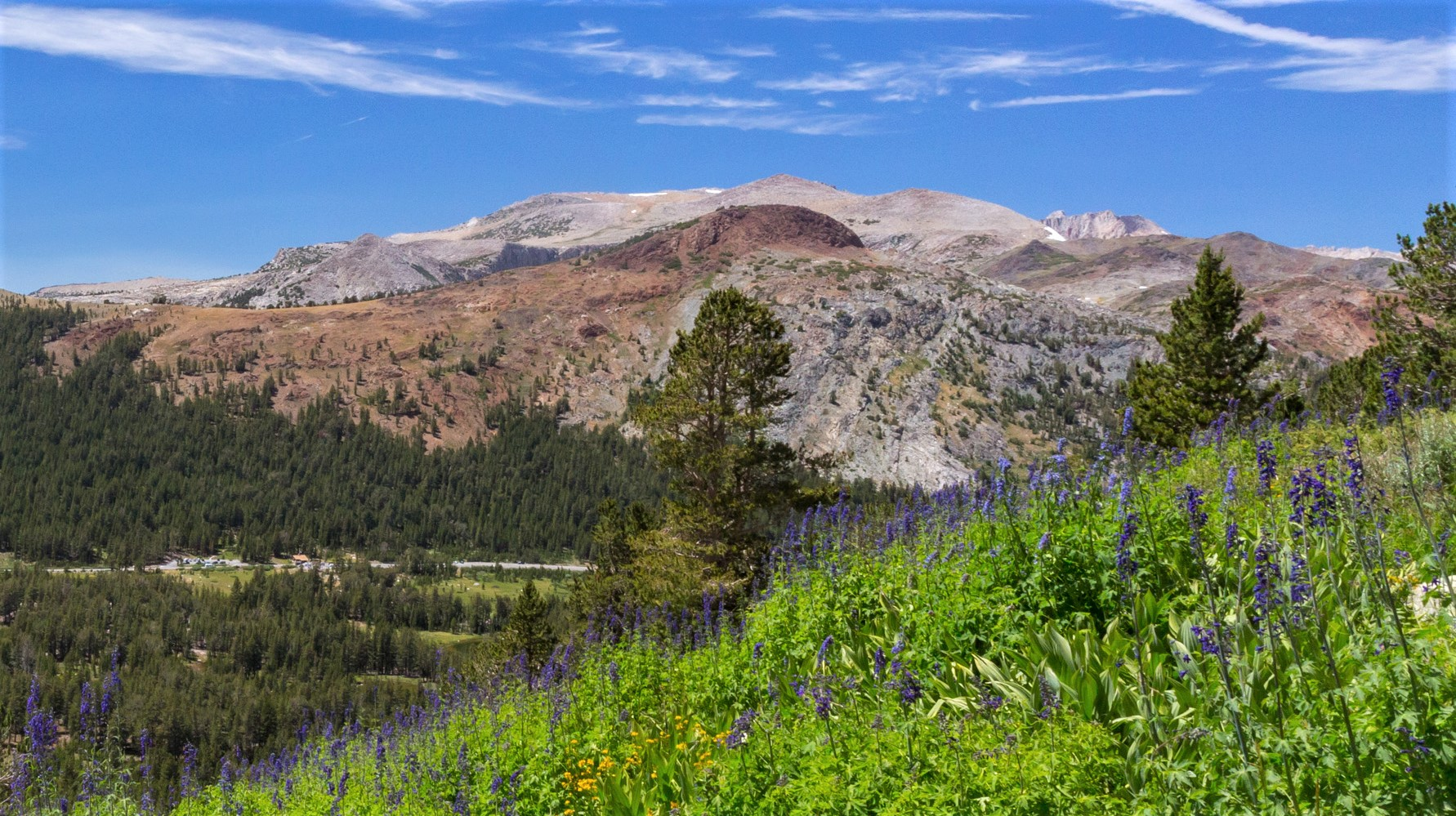
Looking northwest at Gaylor Peak (reddish top) with parent False White Mountain behind. Yosemite's Tioga Pass Entrance Station is visible on the road.

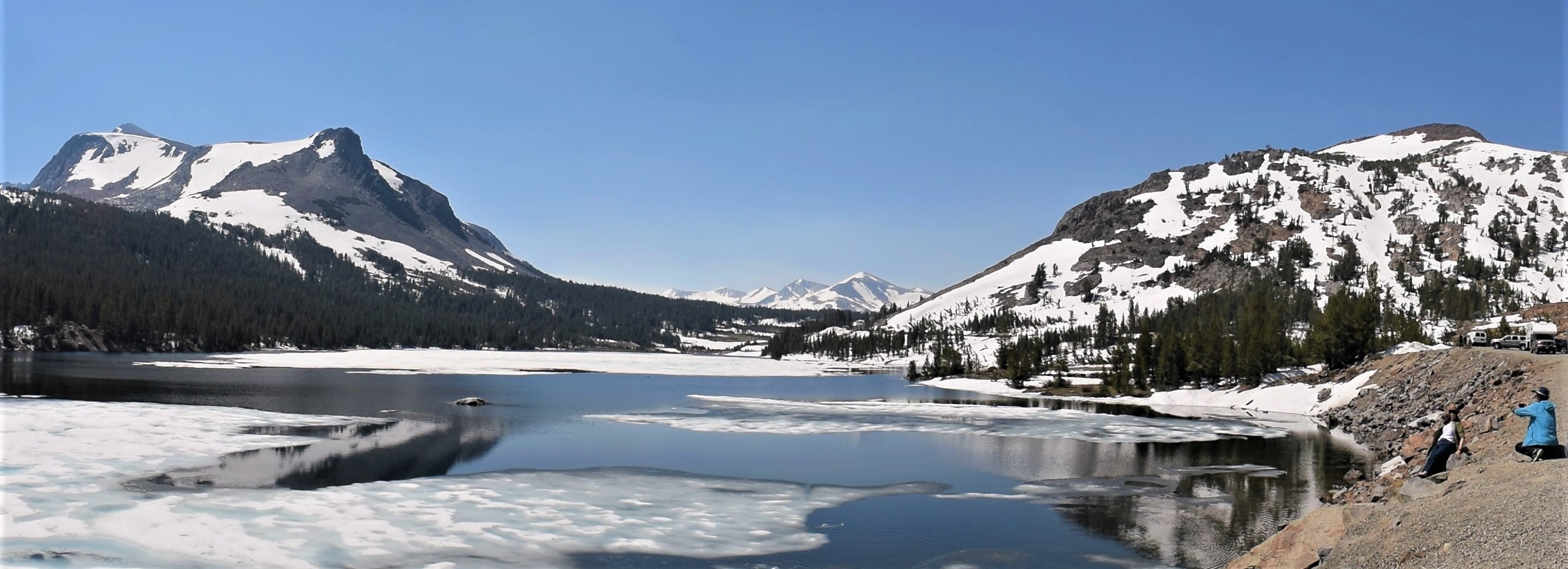
Mount Dana (left), Kuna Crest (centered in the distance), and Gaylor Peak (right) seen from Tioga Lake.

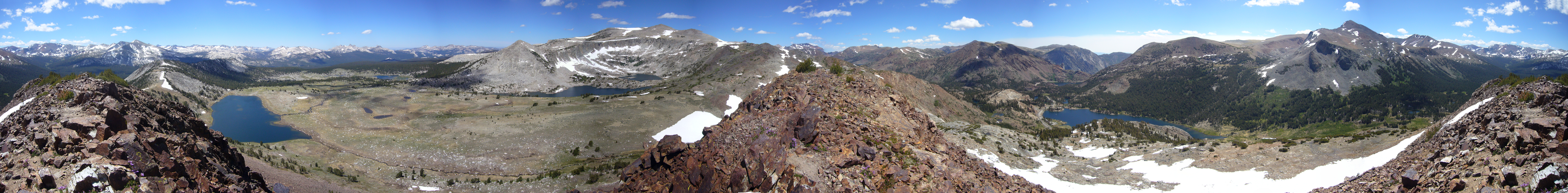
Summit panorama

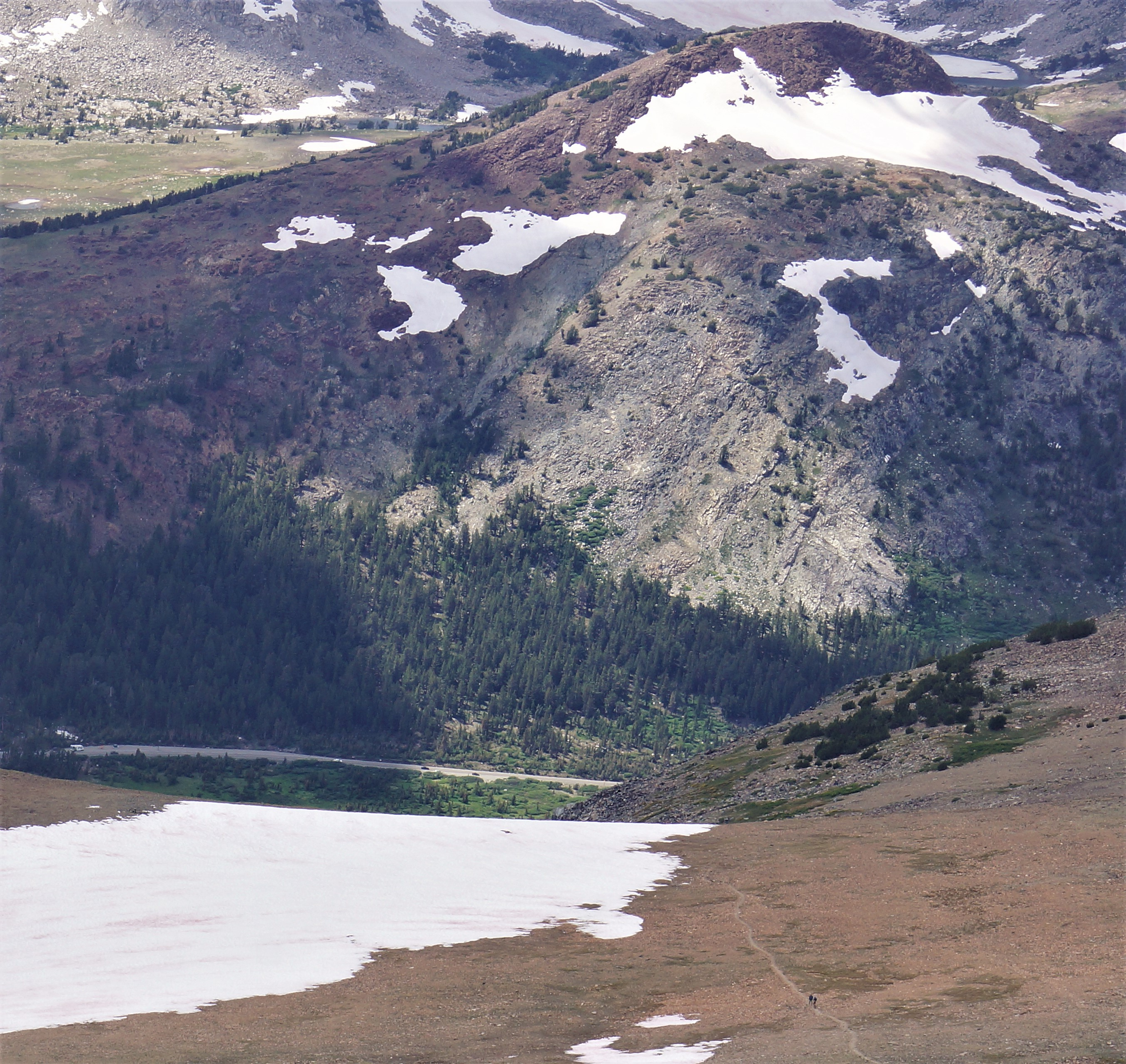
Gaylor Peak seen from Mount Dana

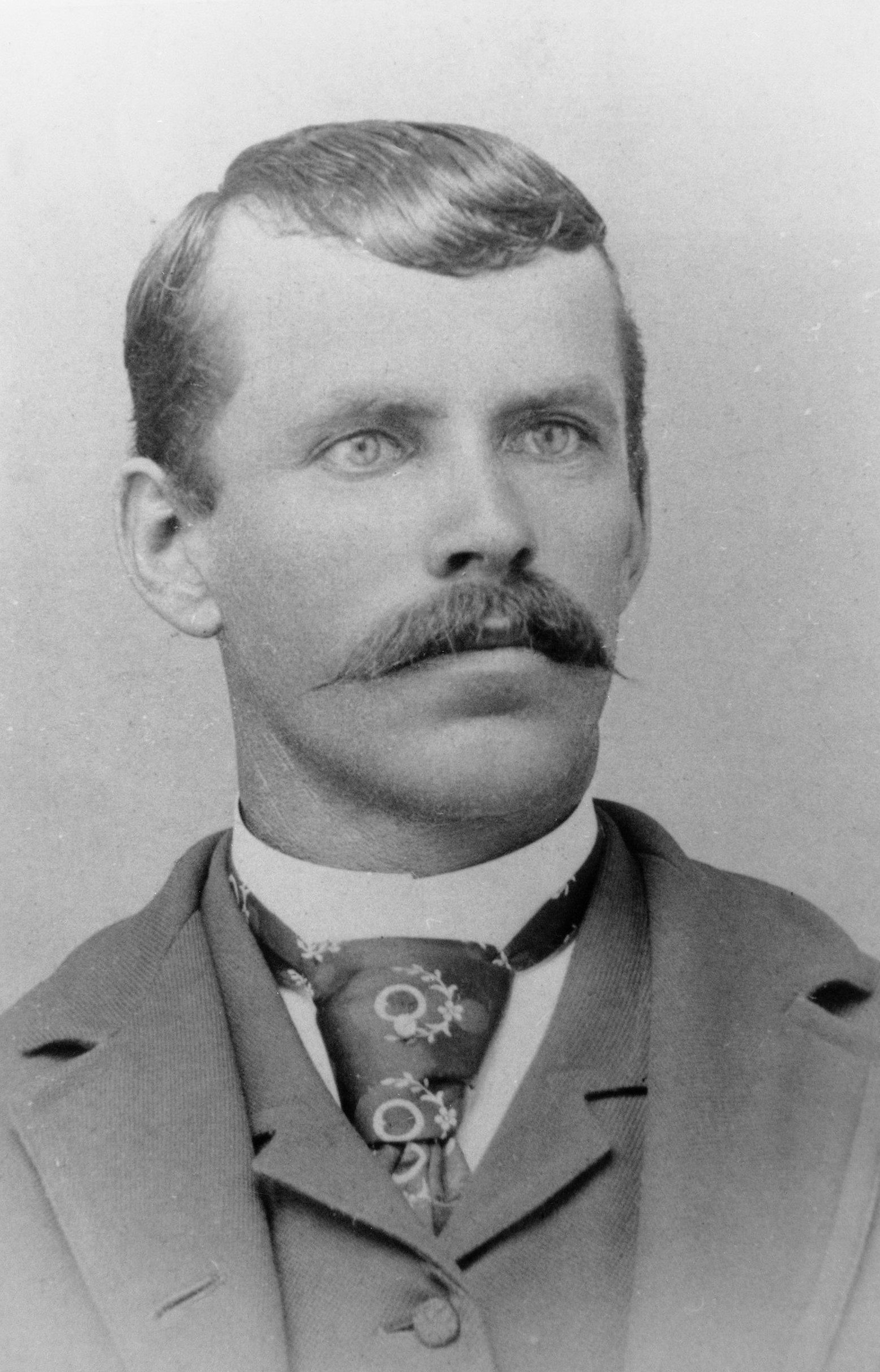
Andrew "Jack" Gaylor, circa 1881

== See also ==
- List of mountain peaks of California
