= Great Sierra Mine Historic Site =

- U.S. National Register of Historic Places
- U.S. Historic district
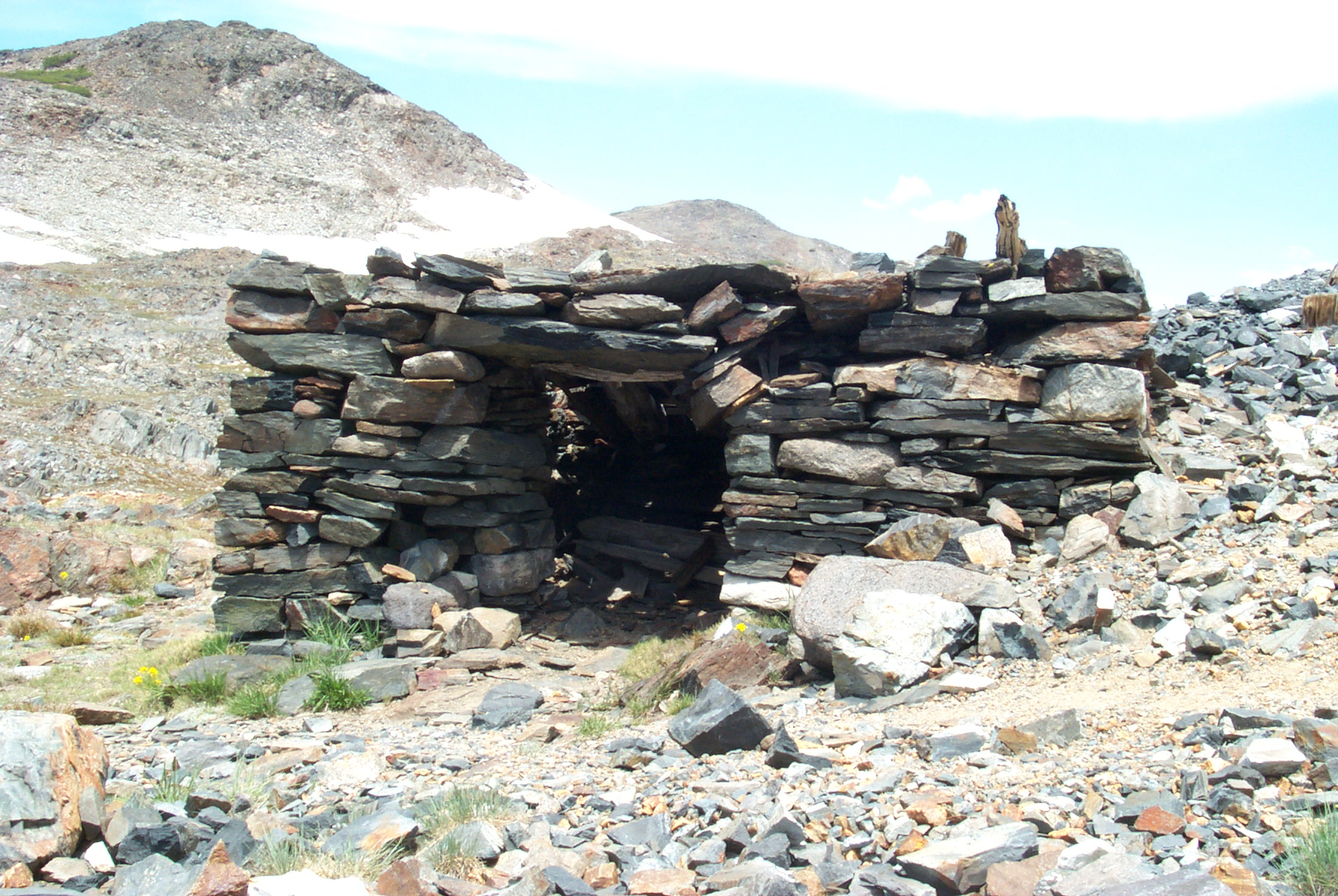

- Location within California Location within the United States
- Nearest city: Lee Vining, California, U.S.
- Coordinates: 37°55′33″N 119°16′05″W
- Built: 1881
- Architect: Great Sierra Consolidated Silver
- NRHP reference No.: 78000382
- Added to NRHP: May 24, 1978

The Great Sierra Mine Historic Site, also known as Dana Village, preserves the site of the largest mining operation in what would later become Yosemite National Park in California. The Great Sierra Mining Company established Dana Village as the support facility for the operations of the Sheepherder Lode, reputed for a rich silver vein.

== History ==
The mine was located on Tioga Hill on the crest and eastern slope of the Sierra Nevada. The Sheepherder Lode was discovered in 1860, and rediscovered by shepherd Thomas Brusky Jr., who staked a number of claims in the area. In 1881 all of the claims were bought out by the Great Sierra Consolidated Silver Mining Company and established the company town of Dana. Due to the c. 11,000 feet (3,400 m) altitude the town was soon relocated to the bottom of the hill at Bennettville.

After an adit was driven 1784 feet into the side of the hill at an expenditure of $300,000, operations were closed down in 1884. They resumed with modern equipment in 1933, but did not find the Sheepherder Lode, and operations ceased for good.

Today, five stone cabins, a powder house and a blacksmith shop remain. The shafts have collapsed or have been filled in.

== See also ==
- National Register of Historic Places listings in Tuolumne County, California
