= Mount Dana =

Mountain in California, United States

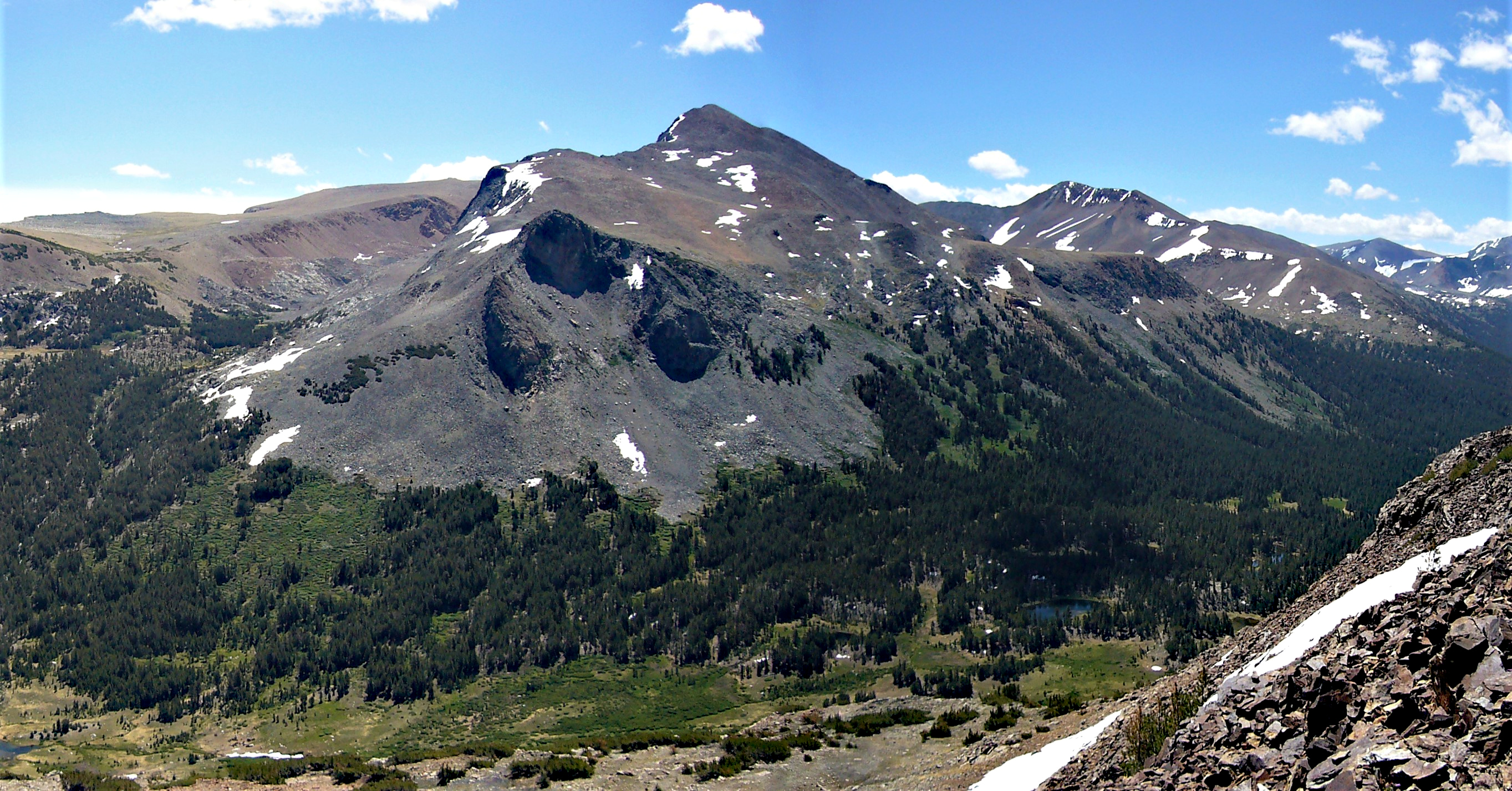
- Mount Dana seen from Gaylor Peak. The hike to the top goes up this west face.

Highest point
- Elevation: 13,061 ft (3,981 m) NAVD 88
- Prominence: 2,417 ft (737 m)
- Parent peak: Mount Lyell
- Listing: California highest major peaks 18th
- Coordinates: 37°54′00″N 119°13′16″W

Geography
- Location: Mono / Tuolumne counties, California, U.S.
- Parent range: Sierra Nevada
- Topo map: USGS Mount Dana

Geology
- Rock age: Cretaceous
- Mountain type: Metamorphic rock

Climbing
- First ascent: June 28, 1863 by Whitney, Brewer, and Hoffmann
- Easiest route: Hike, class 1

Mount Dana is a mountain in the U.S. state of California. Its summit marks the eastern boundary of Yosemite National Park and the western boundary of the Ansel Adams Wilderness. At an elevation of 13,061 feet (3,981 m), it is the second highest mountain in Yosemite (after Mount Lyell), and the northernmost summit in the Sierra Nevada which is over 13,000 feet (3,962.4 m) in elevation. Mount Dana is the highest peak in Yosemite that is readily accessible to summit. The mountain is named in honor of James Dwight Dana, who was a professor of natural history and geology at Yale.

Mount Dana is composed of prebatholithic rock that is mostly reddish metamorphic rock, which was composed by metavolcanics of surfacing magma from the Mesozoic Era.

Mount Dana's northern face includes a small, receding glacier known as the Dana Glacier. The Dana Meadows lie at the foot of the mountain. From the top, lakes throughout Dana Meadows, Mono Lake, Tioga Peak and many other mountains are in view.

== Hike ==
From the Tioga Pass Road there are many easy routes (class 1) that lead to the summit along the mountain's western or southern slopes. These routes rise 3,108 feet (947 m) in elevation in 2.9 miles (4.7 km), (a 20.3% average grade). The trail is not frequently maintained.

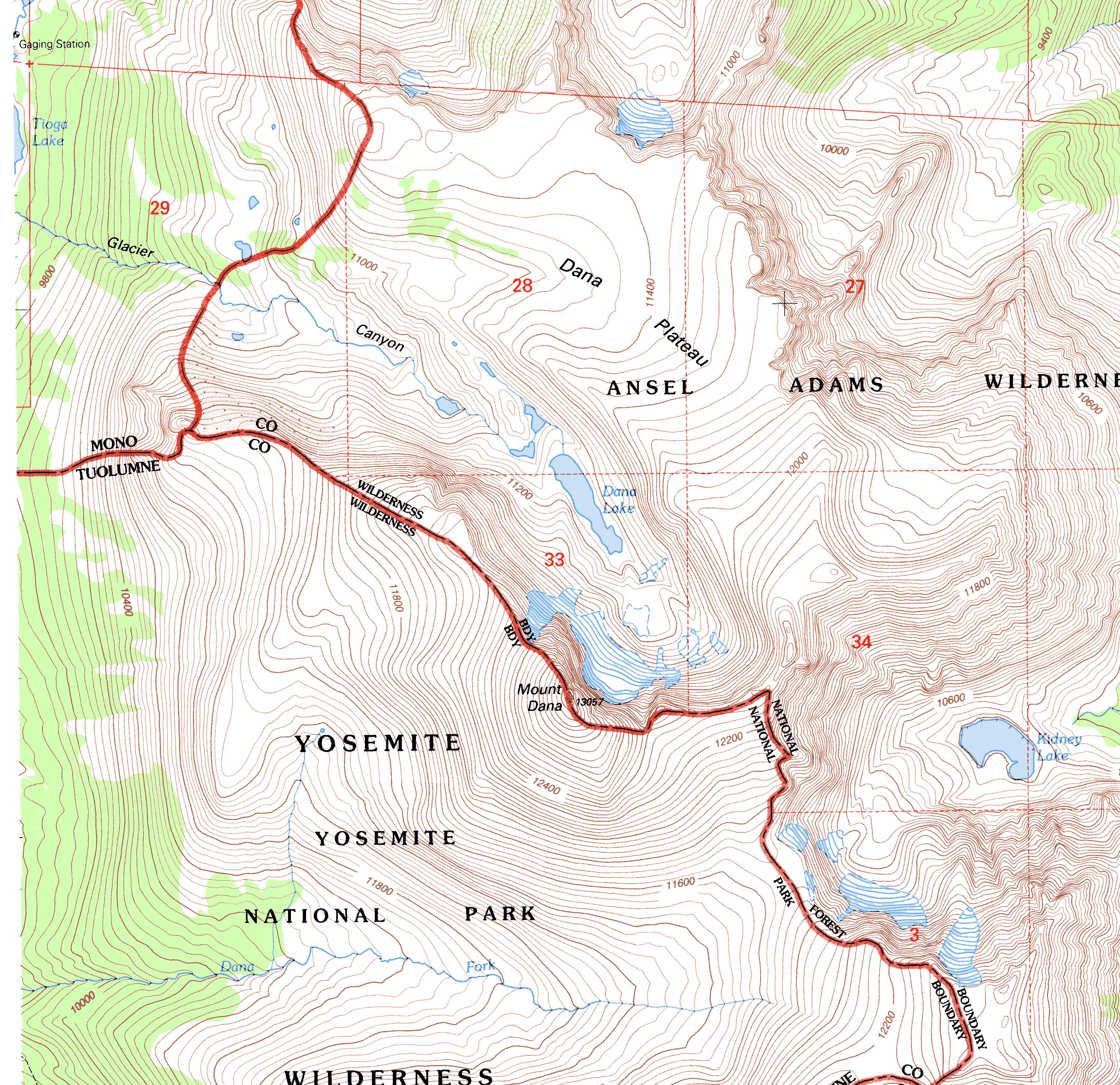
Mount Dana Topographic Map

There is a clearly marked path leading just above tree line. After topping a ridge, a set of use-paths and ducked routes are present, with the main path running along the easterly ridgeline. Additionally, numerous alternate trail segments begin and end at various points on the southwestern face, making parts of this hike a difficult class 2. The path segments turn into scree toward the summit, where a shallow stone-walled shelter and register are found. Significant snow fields on the mountain slopes can exist late into the summer season. Total round trip hiking time can be anywhere between 3 and 12 hours depending many factors, such as acclimatization to elevation.

After reaching a plateau above the tree line, most vegetation disappears with the exception of lichen and a few high alpine plants such as Sky Pilot (Polemonium eximium). Fauna are largely limited to spiders and insects, such as black/brown grasshoppers. The only mammals other than humans are American Pikas (which are lagomorphs, related to rabbits) and marmots.

Thunderstorms are known to arise suddenly, making the rocks slippery, and the hiking dangerous year round.

Even experienced hikers can face altitude sickness, due to the high elevation.

In the summer of 2009, an NPS employee died after falling on a technical rock climbing route on the northeast face of Mount Dana.

== Climate ==
Climate data for Mount Dana 37.9018 N, 119.2233 W, Elevation: 12,385 ft (3,775 m) (1991–2020 normals)
Month	Jan	Feb	Mar	Apr	May	Jun	Jul	Aug	Sep	Oct	Nov	Dec	Year
Mean daily maximum °F (°C)	28.5 (−1.9)	26.9 (−2.8)	29.4 (−1.4)	33.6 (0.9)	41.3 (5.2)	51.2 (10.7)	59.2 (15.1)	58.5 (14.7)	53.0 (11.7)	44.2 (6.8)	34.6 (1.4)	28.5 (−1.9)	40.7 (4.9)
Daily mean °F (°C)	19.0 (−7.2)	17.0 (−8.3)	19.0 (−7.2)	22.1 (−5.5)	29.1 (−1.6)	38.4 (3.6)	45.6 (7.6)	44.9 (7.2)	39.6 (4.2)	32.0 (0.0)	24.6 (−4.1)	19.2 (−7.1)	29.2 (−1.5)
Mean daily minimum °F (°C)	9.6 (−12.4)	7.0 (−13.9)	8.7 (−12.9)	10.6 (−11.9)	16.8 (−8.4)	25.6 (−3.6)	32.0 (0.0)	31.2 (−0.4)	26.3 (−3.2)	19.9 (−6.7)	14.5 (−9.7)	10.0 (−12.2)	17.7 (−7.9)
Average precipitation inches (mm)	10.83 (275)	9.58 (243)	8.50 (216)	4.66 (118)	2.49 (63)	0.62 (16)	0.66 (17)	0.53 (13)	0.49 (12)	2.72 (69)	3.98 (101)	9.32 (237)	54.38 (1,380)
Source: PRISM Climate Group

== Gallery ==
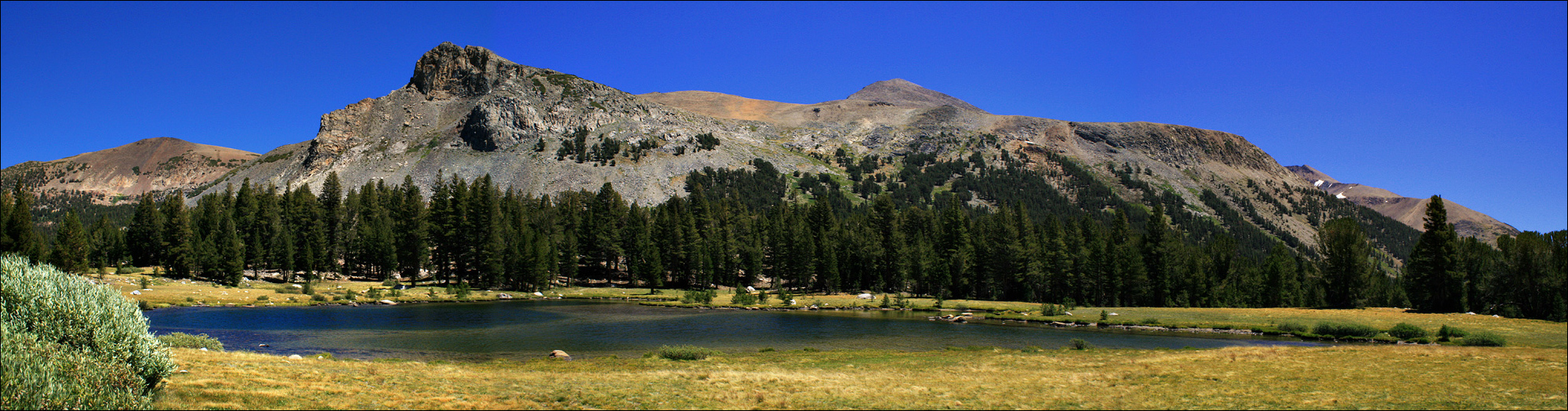
Panoramic Photograph of Mount Dana, Yosemite National Park taken from Tioga Pass Park Entrance
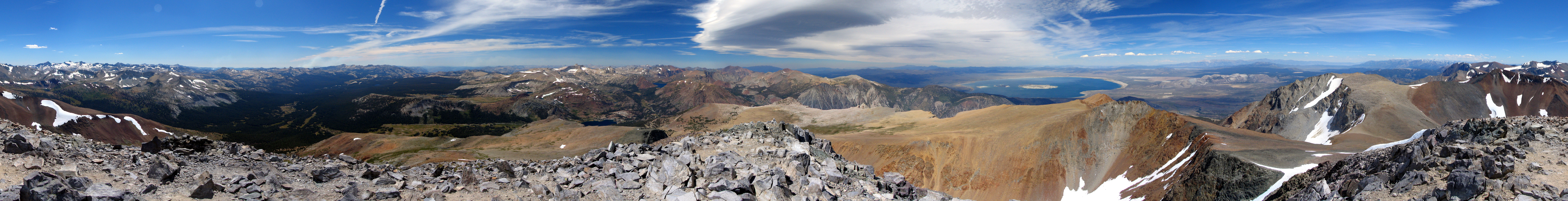
The view from the summit encompasses much of Yosemite National Park and Mono Lake
