= List of highest mountains of Yosemite National Park =

Many mountains in Yosemite National Park are higher than 12,000 feet (3,700 m); three are higher than 13,000 feet (4,000 m). The peaks of Yosemite are among some of the highest mountains in California.

The below table gives information from Peakbagger and Summitpost. Some mountains are listed by one but not the other, and some elevations vary, as prominence varies; the clean prominence method is used in this table.

== List ==
Number	Peak	Elevation, by Peakbagger	Elevation, by Summitpost	prominence, by Peakbagger	prominence, by Summitpost	Isolation, by Peakbagger	Peakbagger reference	Summitpost reference	Near area of Yosemite	Coordinates
1	Mount Lyell	13,114 feet (3,997 m)	13,057 feet (3,980 m)	1,894 feet (577 m)	1,927 feet (587 m)	5.2 miles (8.4 km)			Cathedral Range, near Tuolumne Meadows	37°44′22″N 119°16′18″W
2	Mount Dana	13,057 feet (3,980 m)	13,057 feet (3,980 m)	2,417 feet (737 m)	2,437 feet (743 m)	11.4 miles (18.3 km)			Tioga Pass	37°53′59″N 119°13′16″W
3	Kuna Peak	13,002 feet (3,963 m)	13,002 feet (3,963 m)	1,922 feet (586 m)	1,942 feet (592 m)	6 miles (9.7 km)			Tuolumne Meadows, Mammoth Peak	37°48′46″N 119°12′30″W
4	Rodgers Peak	12,978 feet (3,956 m)	12,978 feet (3,956 m)	738 feet (225 m)	758 feet (231 m)	1.3 miles (2.1 km)			Ritter Range	37°43′30″N 119°15′27″W
5	Mount Maclure	12,880 feet (3,930 m)	12,900 feet (3,900 m)	738 feet (225 m)	480 feet (150 m)	0.5 miles (0.80 km)			Cathedral Range, near Mount Lyell	37°44′37″N 119°16′50″W
6	Mount Gibbs	12,773 feet (3,893 m)	12,773 feet (3,893 m)	1,093 feet (333 m)	1,113 feet (339 m)	1.5 miles (2.4 km)			Tioga Pass Road, near Mount Dana	37°52′37″N 119°12′43″W
7	Peak 12767	12,767 feet (3,891 m)	12,767 feet (3,891 m)	487 feet (148 m)	507 feet (155 m)	0.7 miles (1.1 km)			Mount Lyell	37°44′N 119°17′W
8	Koip Crest Peak	12,651 feet (3,856 m)		91 feet (28 m)		0.4 miles (0.64 km)			Tuolumne Meadows	37°48′N 119°12′W
9	Mount Conness	12,590 feet (3,840 m)	12,590 feet (3,840 m)	2,630 feet (800 m)	2,647 feet (807 m)	7 miles (11 km)			Tioga Pass	37°58′1″N 119°19′18″W
10	Point 12573		12,573 feet (3,832 m)		353 feet (108 m)				Mount Lyell	37.71476°N 119.25841°W
11	Mount Florence	12,561 feet (3,829 m)	12,561 feet (3,829 m)	801 feet (244 m)	821 feet (250 m)	1.9 miles (3.1 km)			Mount Lyell, Vogelsang Peak	37°44′23″N 119°18′58″W
12	Point 12540	12,540 feet (3,820 m)		360 feet (110 m)					Vogelsang Peak	37.75514°N 119.28946°W
13	Simmons Peak	12,497 feet (3,809 m)	12,497 feet (3,809 m)	377 feet (115 m)	397 feet (121 m)	1.3 miles (2.1 km)			Mount Lyell, Tuolumne Meadows	37°45′39″N 119°17′40″W
14	Electra Peak	12,442 feet (3,792 m)	12,446 feet (3,794 m)	322 feet (98 m)	1,266 feet (386 m)	0.6 miles (0.97 km)			Tuolumne Meadows, Rodgers Peak	37°42′18″N 119°15′37″W
15	Point 12358		12,358 feet (3,767 m)		298 feet (91 m)				Mount Lyell	37.74100°N 119.29279°W
16	Twin Peaks		12,323 feet (3,756 m)						Matterhorn Peak	38.08310°N 119.3574°W
17	Peak 12320	12,320 feet (3,760 m)		0 feet (0 m)		0 miles (0 km)			Simmons Peak, Mount Lyell	37°45′2″N 119°17′49″W
18	Matterhorn Peak		12,279 feet (3,743 m)		1,579 feet (481 m)				Northern boundary of Yosemite National Park	38.09280°N 119.3803°W
19	Mount Andrea Lawrence		12,245 feet (3,732 m)		800 feet (240 m)				Tioga Pass Road	37.77968°N 119.22015°W
20	North Peak	12,242 feet (3,731 m)	12,242 feet (3,731 m)	682 feet (208 m)	702 feet (214 m)	1.1 miles (1.8 km)			Saddlebag Lake	37°58′56″N 119°18′53″W
21	Excelsior Mountain	12,200 feet (3,700 m)	12,446 feet (3,794 m)	0 feet (0 m)	1,266 feet (386 m)	0.1 miles (0.16 km)			Virginia Lakes, Mount Conness	38°1′49″N 119°18′27″W
22	Parsons Peak	12,147 feet (3,702 m)	12,147 feet (3,702 m)	627 feet (191 m)	647 feet (197 m)	1.3 miles (2.1 km)			Cathedral Range	37°46′37″N 119°18′28″W
23	Point 12113		12,113 feet (3,692 m)		573 feet (175 m)				Mount Lyell	37.71969°N 119.29273°W
24	Mammoth Peak	12,106 feet (3,690 m)	12,106 feet (3,690 m)	306 feet (93 m)	286 feet (87 m)	0.8 miles (1.3 km)			Tioga Pass, Kuna Crest	37°51′19″N 119°15′49″W
25	Foerster Peak	12,057 feet (3,675 m)	12,057 feet (3,675 m)	457 feet (139 m)	477 feet (145 m)	1.7 miles (2.7 km)			East of Half Dome	37°41′24″N 119°17′27″W
26	White Mountain	12,057 feet (3,675 m)	12,057 feet (3,675 m)	617 feet (188 m)	637 feet (194 m)	1 mile (1.6 km)			Dog Lake, Mount Conness	37°56′49″N 119°18′35″W
27	Shepherd Crest	12,040 feet (3,670 m)	12,020 feet (3,660 m)	560 feet (170 m)	560 feet (170 m)	0.6 miles (0.97 km)			Saddlebag Lake, Tioga Pass Road	38°0′N 119°19′W
28	Whorl Mountain	12,033 feet (3,668 m)	12,033 feet (3,668 m)	673 feet (205 m)	693 feet (211 m)	1.3 miles (2.1 km)			Matterhorn Peak	38°4′27″N 119°23′0″W
29	Donohue Peak	12,023 feet (3,665 m)	12,023 feet (3,665 m)	463 feet (141 m)	483 feet (147 m)	0.6 miles (0.97 km)			Donohue Pass, Koip Crest Peak	37°46′30″N 119°13′50″W
30	False White Mountain	12,002 feet (3,658 m)	12,002 feet (3,658 m)	482 feet (147 m)	502 feet (153 m)	1.1 miles (1.8 km)			Tioga Pass	37°56′N 119°18′W
31	Virginia Peak	12,001 feet (3,658 m)	12,001 feet (3,658 m)	481 feet (147 m)	501 feet (153 m)	0.8 miles (1.3 km)			Twin Lakes, Whorl Mountain	38°3′57″N 119°21′29″W

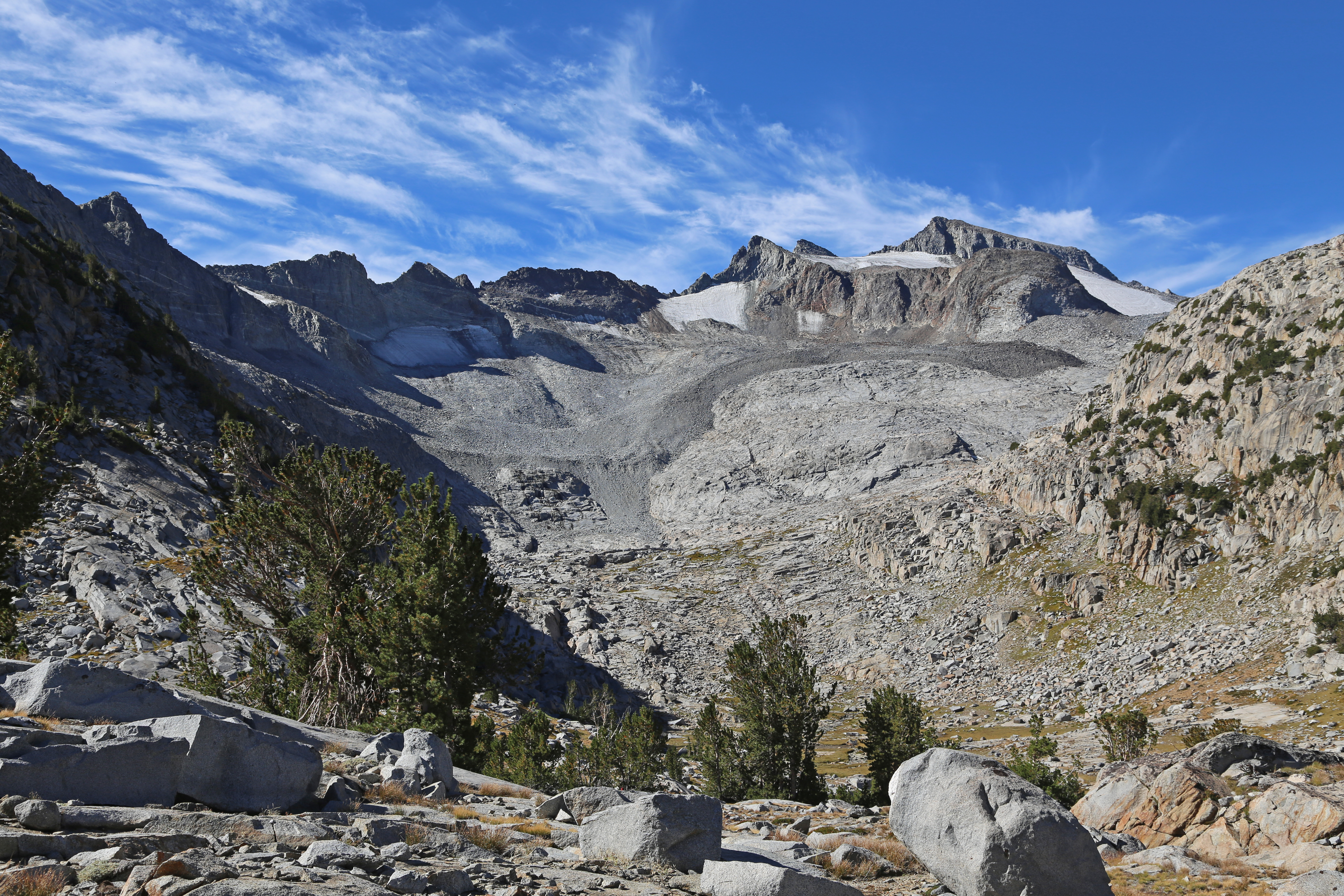
Mount Lyell, the highest mountain of Yosemite

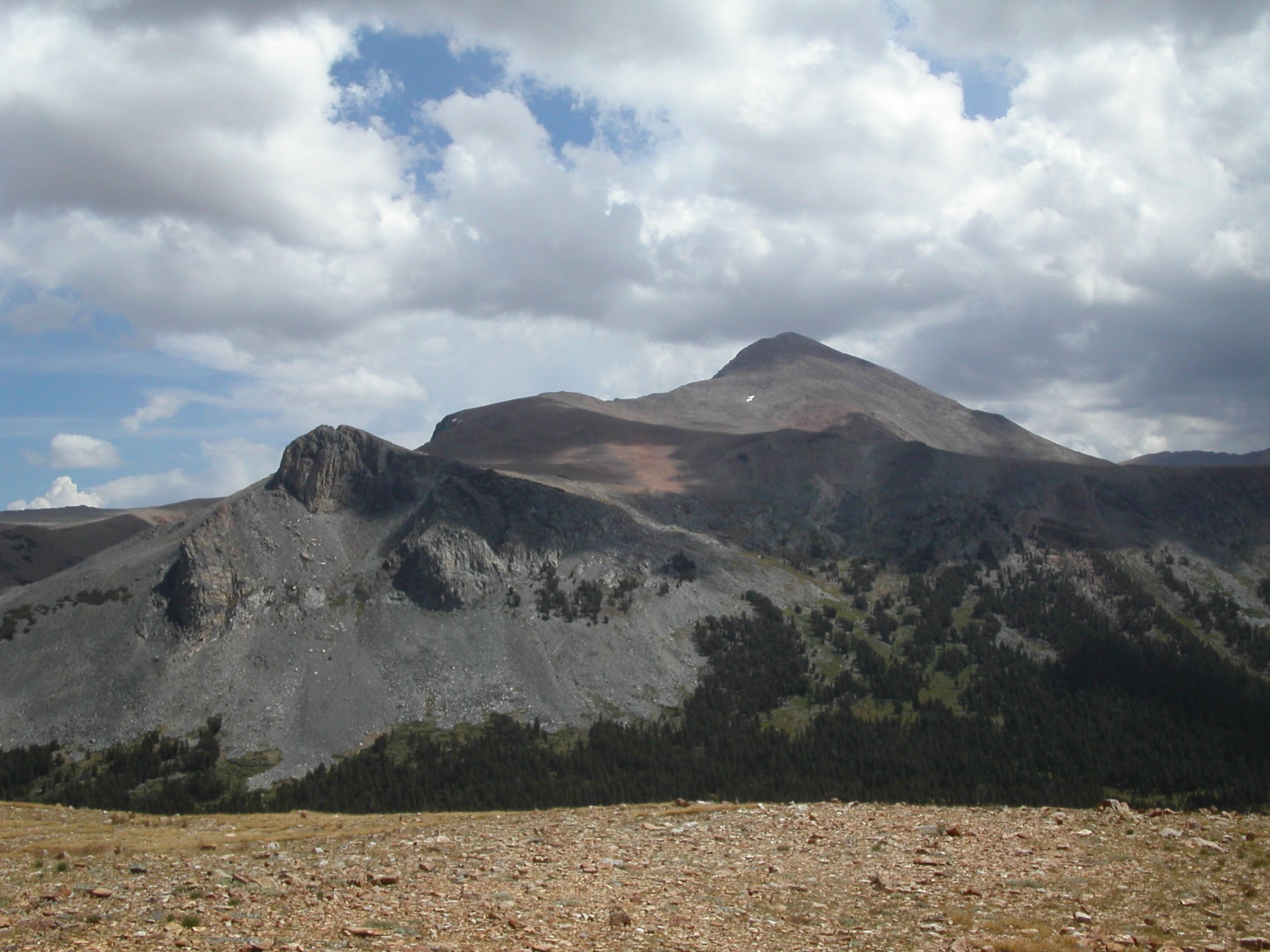
Mount Dana

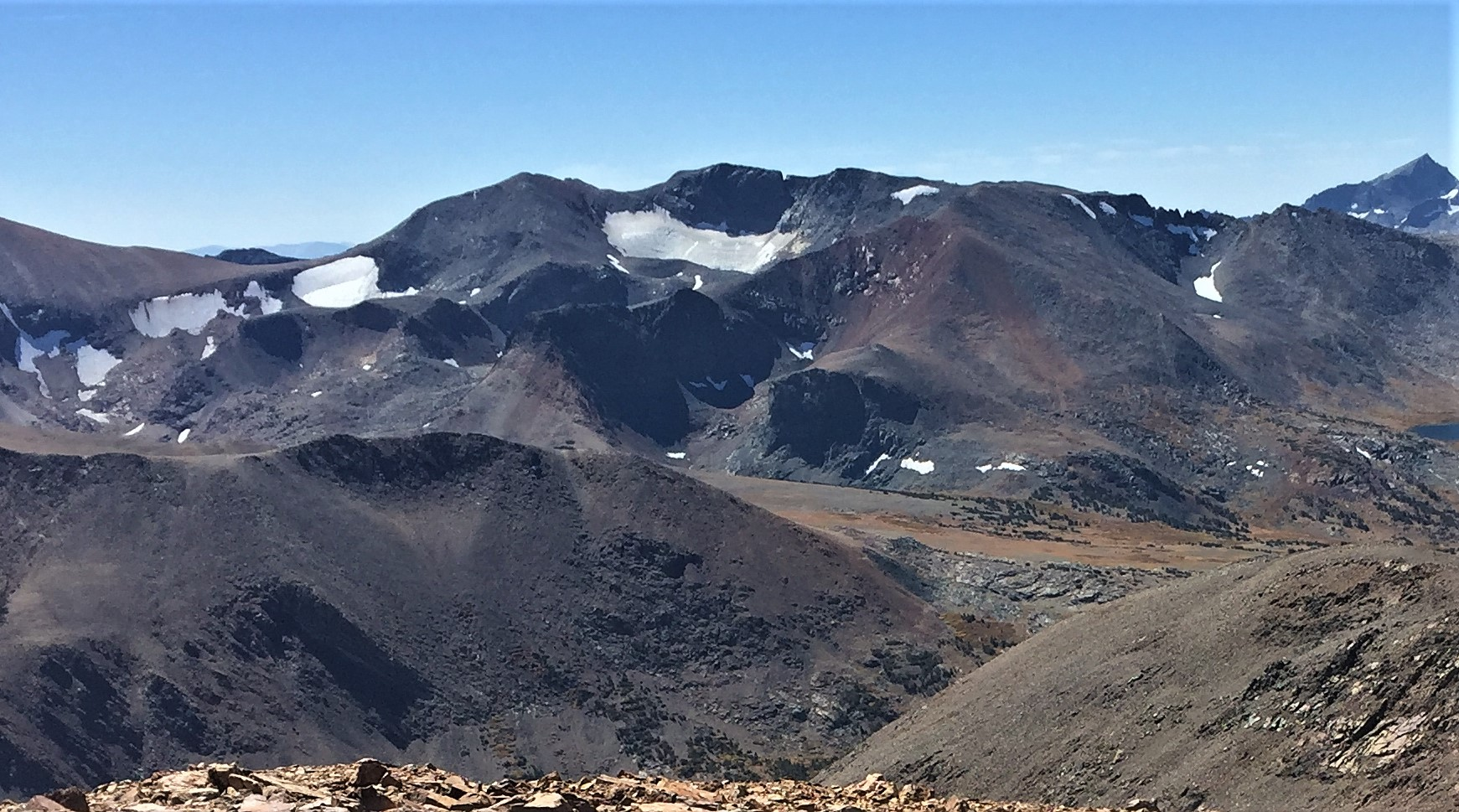
Kuna Peak

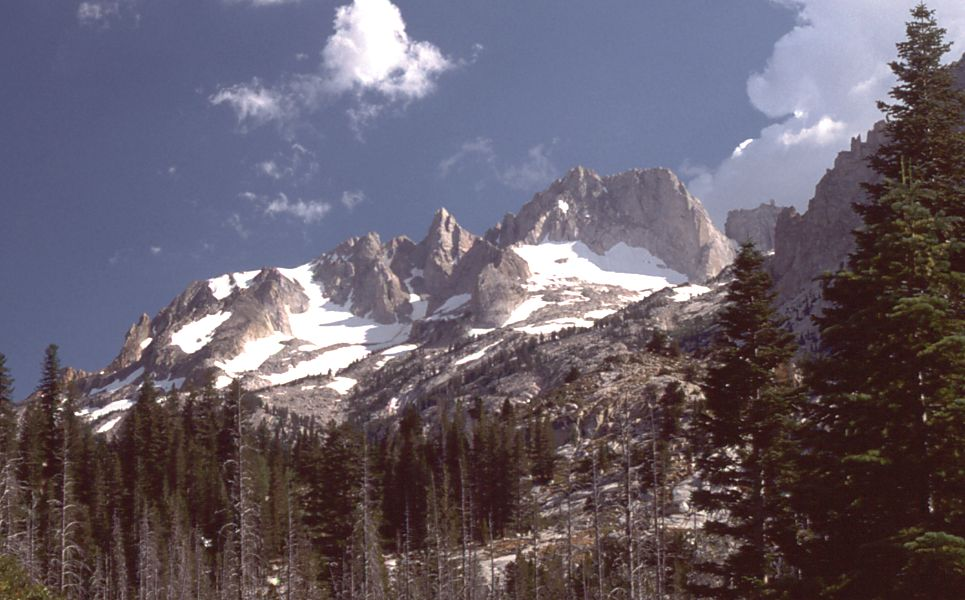
Matterhorn Peak, not to be confused with The Matterhorn.

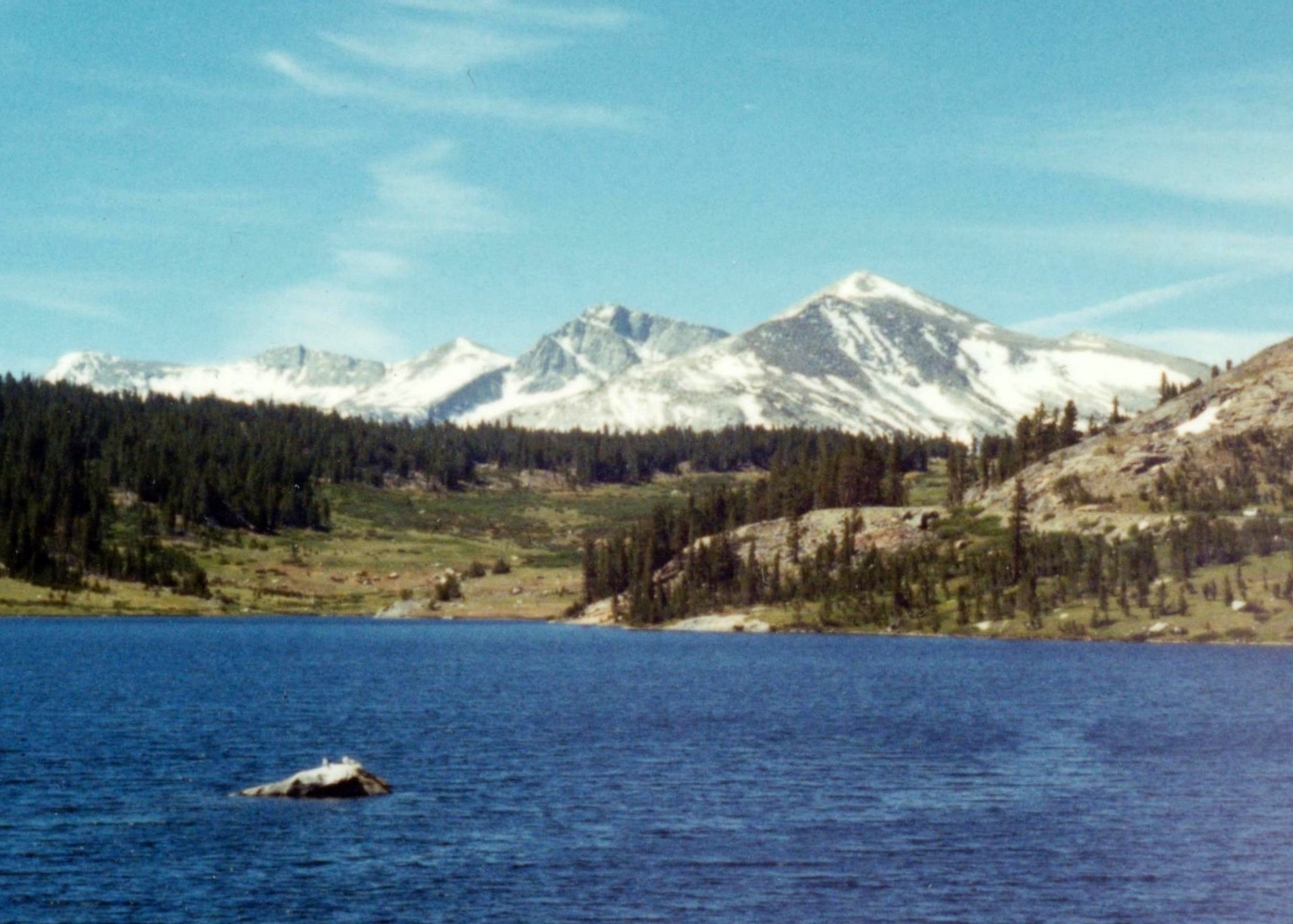
Mammoth Peak and Kuna Crest, taken near Gaylor Lakes

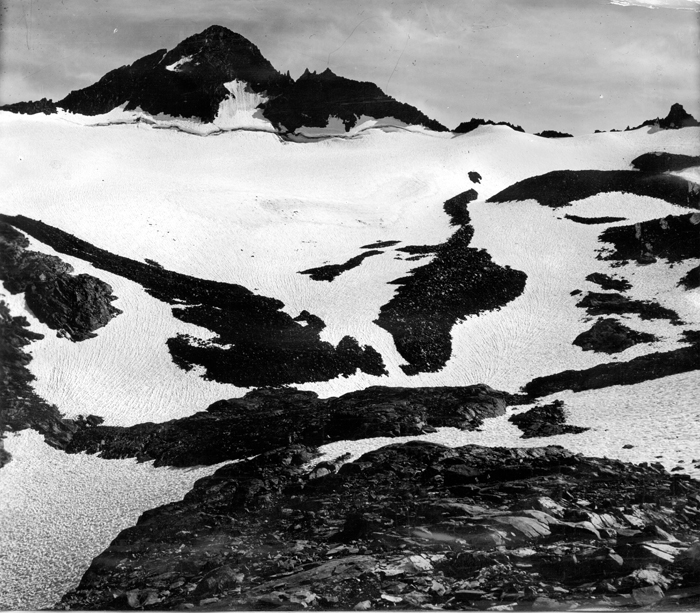
Mount Maclure, Yosemite's fifth-highest mountain
