= Conness =

Conness may refer to:

- John Conness (1821–1909), American politician and US senator from California
- Robert Conness (1867–1941), American actor
- Mount Conness, a mountain in California
- Conness Glacier, on the northeast cirque of the mountain
  - Conness Lakes, a group of lakes at the foot of the glacier
