= Stanton Peak =

Mountain in the state of California

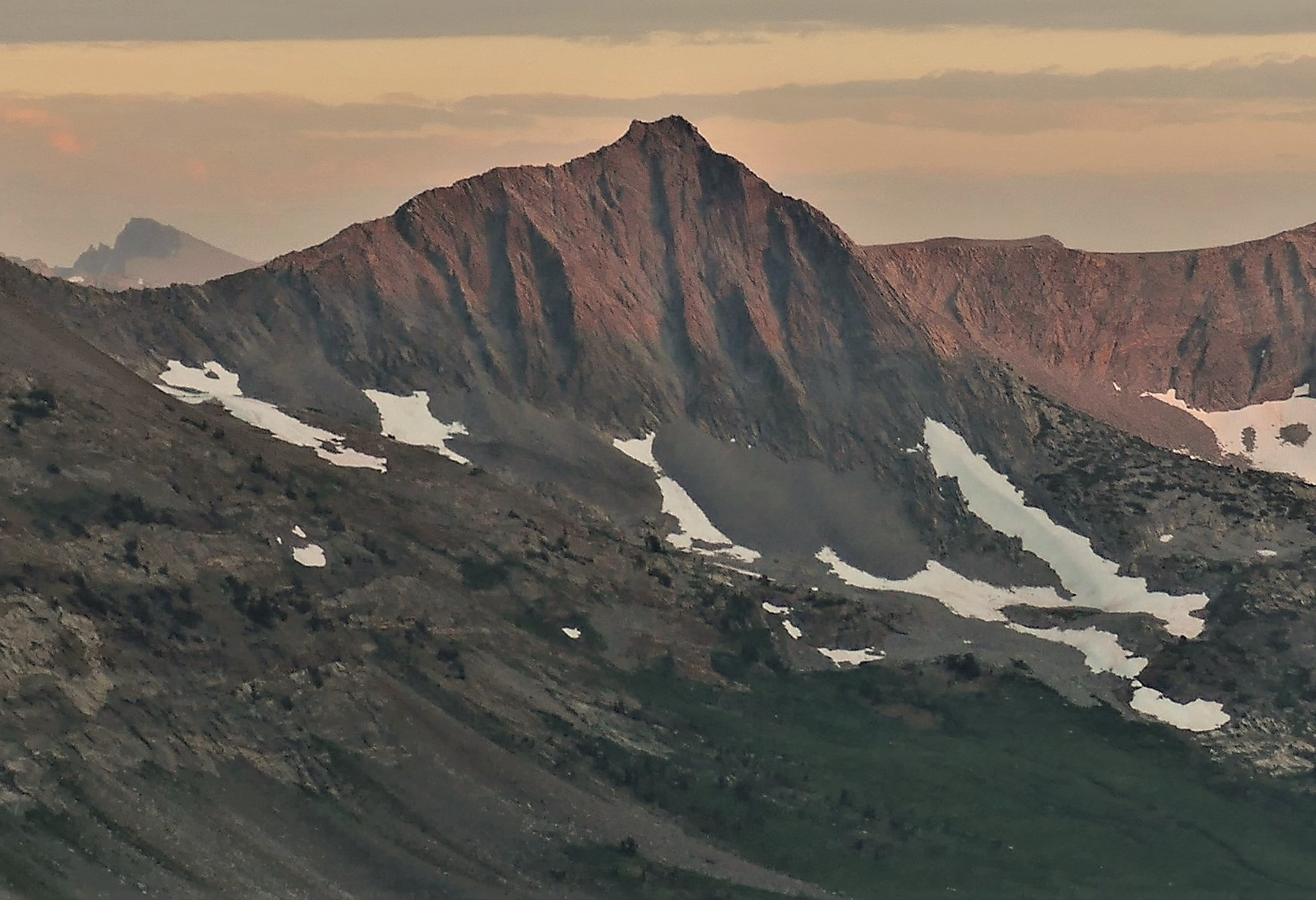
- North aspect, at sunset

Highest point
- Elevation: 11,695 ft (3,565 m)
- Prominence: 495 ft (151 m)
- Parent peak: Virginia Peak (12,002 ft)
- Isolation: 0.63 mi (1.01 km)
- Coordinates: 38°03′27″N 119°21′46″W

Geography
- Location within California Location within the United States
- Location: Yosemite National Park; Tuolumne County, California, U.S.
- Parent range: Sierra Nevada
- Topo map: USGS Dunderberg Peak

Geology
- Rock age: Cretaceous
- Mountain type: Fault block
- Rock type: Cathedral Peak Granodiorite

Climbing
- First ascent: 1934
- Easiest route: class 2 North ridge

Stanton Peak is a granitic mountain with a summit elevation of 11,695 feet (3,565 m) located in the Sierra Nevada mountain range, in Tuolumne County of northern California, United States. The remote summit is set within Yosemite National Park, and is situated 0.63 mile southwest of line parent Virginia Peak, 1.6 mile southeast of Whorl Mountain, and 2.6 miles south-southeast of Matterhorn Peak. Stanton Peak is bound on the west by Spiller Creek and on the east by Return Creek, so precipitation runoff from this mountain drains into these two tributaries of the Tuolumne River. Topographic relief is significant as the summit rises over 2,100 feet (640 meters) above Spiller Creek in one mile.

== History ==
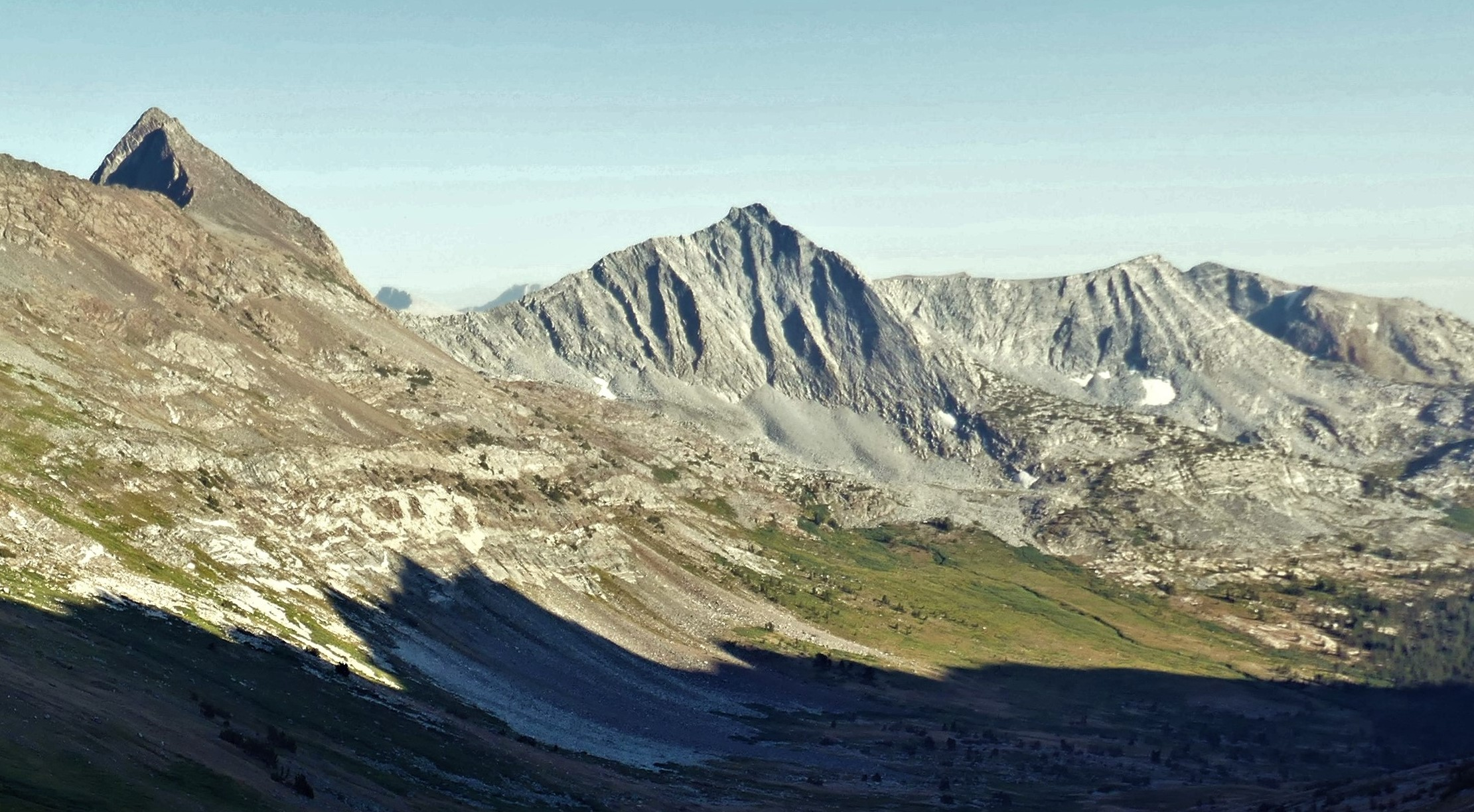
Stanton Peak centered, and Virginia Peak (left)

Stanton Peak is the toponym officially adopted in 1932 by the U.S. Board on Geographic Names for this landform. This toponym's origin is unknown, however it may have been named by Major William W. Forsyth, the acting superintendent of Yosemite Park from 1909 to 1912, possibly to honor General William Stanton (1843–1927). The peak's name and location were published by François E. Matthes on a 1912 map of Yosemite.

The first ascent of the summit was made during a snow storm on May 31, 1934, by Richard G. Johnson, Kenneth May, and Howard Twining.

== Climate ==
According to the Köppen climate classification system, Stanton Peak is located in an alpine climate zone. Most weather fronts originate in the Pacific Ocean, and travel east toward the Sierra Nevada mountains. As fronts approach, they are forced upward by the peaks, causing moisture in the form of rain or snowfall to drop onto the range (orographic lift).

== See also ==
- Geology of the Yosemite area
- Cathedral Peak Granodiorite
