= Twin Peaks (Yosemite) =

Mountain in California, United States

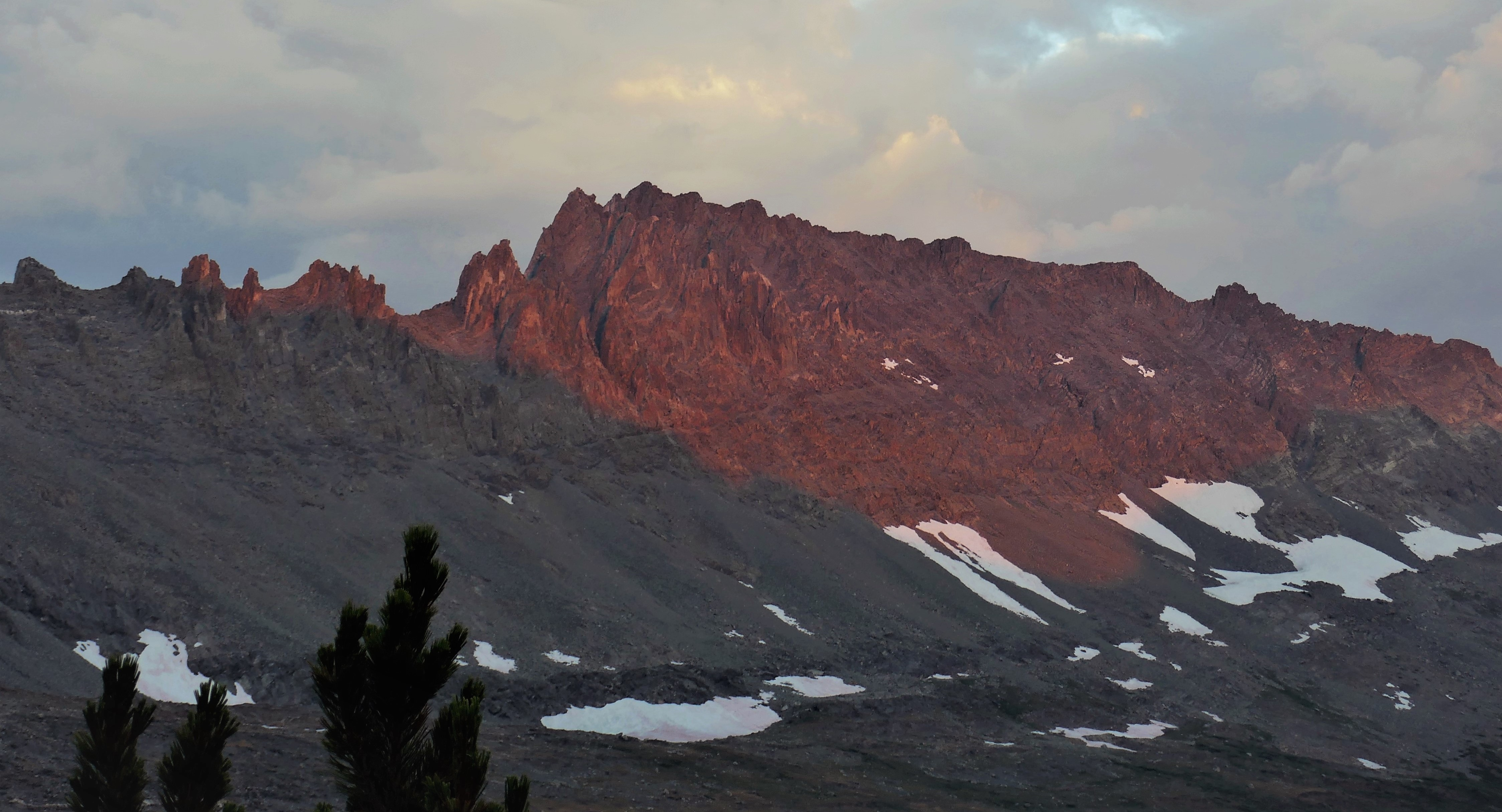
- West aspect at sunset

Highest point
- Elevation: 12,323 ft (3,756 m) NAVD 88
- Prominence: 463 ft (141 m)
- Coordinates: 38°04′59″N 119°21′27″W

Geography
- Location within California Location within the United States
- Location: Yosemite National Park, Tuolumne County, California, U.S.
- Parent range: Sierra Nevada

Climbing
- Easiest route: class 2

Twin Peaks is a mountain in the northern part of Yosemite National Park, north of Tuolumne Meadows. It is the 15th highest mountain in Yosemite National Park.

== On Twin Peaks's particulars ==
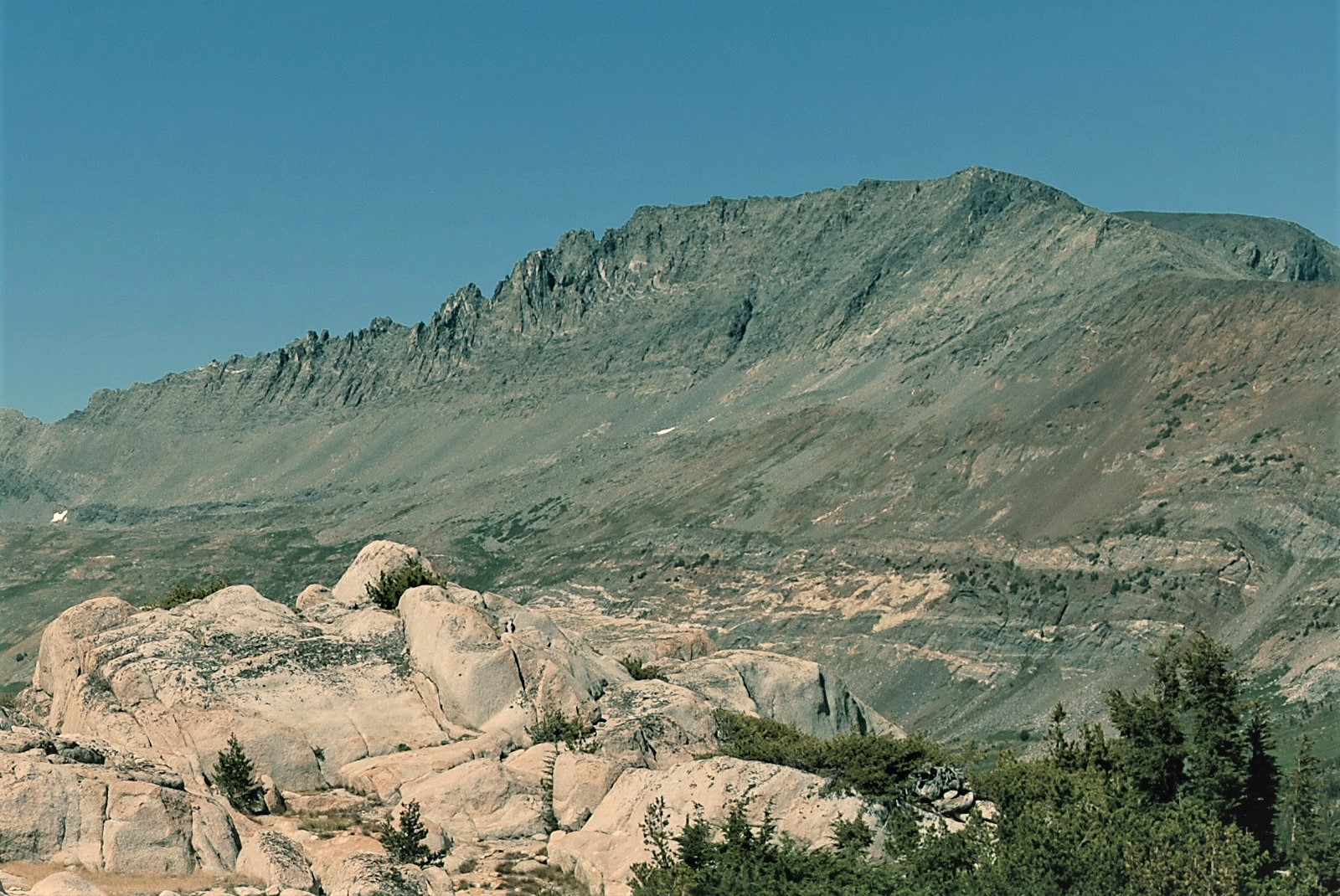
Twin Peaks from SSW

Twin Peaks is near Twin Peaks Pass.

Twin Peaks is at times a somewhat mysterious mountain in Yosemite, on the uppermost reaches of Virginia Canyon. From the east along US 395, Twin Peaks can be difficult to identify.

Twin Peaks has two summits, though they are not twins. The west summit is the high point at 12,323 feet (3,756 m), which makes it slightly higher than its famous neighbor, Matterhorn Peak, which is 12,279 feet (3,743 m) high.

Twin Peaks is also near Whorl Mountain, Black Mountain, Excelsior Mountain, Mount Warren, Virginia Peak, and North Peak. Twin Peaks is west and a bit north of Mono City.

== Climate ==
Climate data for Twin Peaks (Yosemite) 38.0842 N, 119.3527 W, Elevation: 11,850 ft (3,612 m) (1991–2020 normals)
Month	Jan	Feb	Mar	Apr	May	Jun	Jul	Aug	Sep	Oct	Nov	Dec	Year
Mean daily maximum °F (°C)	30.3 (−0.9)	29.0 (−1.7)	31.7 (−0.2)	35.6 (2.0)	43.3 (6.3)	53.1 (11.7)	61.1 (16.2)	60.5 (15.8)	54.7 (12.6)	45.5 (7.5)	36.5 (2.5)	30.2 (−1.0)	42.6 (5.9)
Daily mean °F (°C)	20.7 (−6.3)	18.8 (−7.3)	21.0 (−6.1)	24.1 (−4.4)	31.2 (−0.4)	40.6 (4.8)	48.1 (8.9)	47.4 (8.6)	41.8 (5.4)	33.8 (1.0)	26.4 (−3.1)	20.7 (−6.3)	31.2 (−0.4)
Mean daily minimum °F (°C)	11.0 (−11.7)	8.6 (−13.0)	10.4 (−12.0)	12.6 (−10.8)	19.2 (−7.1)	28.1 (−2.2)	35.2 (1.8)	34.3 (1.3)	29.0 (−1.7)	22.2 (−5.4)	16.3 (−8.7)	11.3 (−11.5)	19.9 (−6.8)
Average precipitation inches (mm)	9.23 (234)	7.95 (202)	7.24 (184)	3.85 (98)	2.40 (61)	0.65 (17)	0.78 (20)	0.68 (17)	0.59 (15)	2.49 (63)	3.88 (99)	8.00 (203)	47.74 (1,213)
Source: PRISM Climate Group
