= Virginia Peak (Yosemite) =

Mountain in Yosemite National Park, California, United States of America

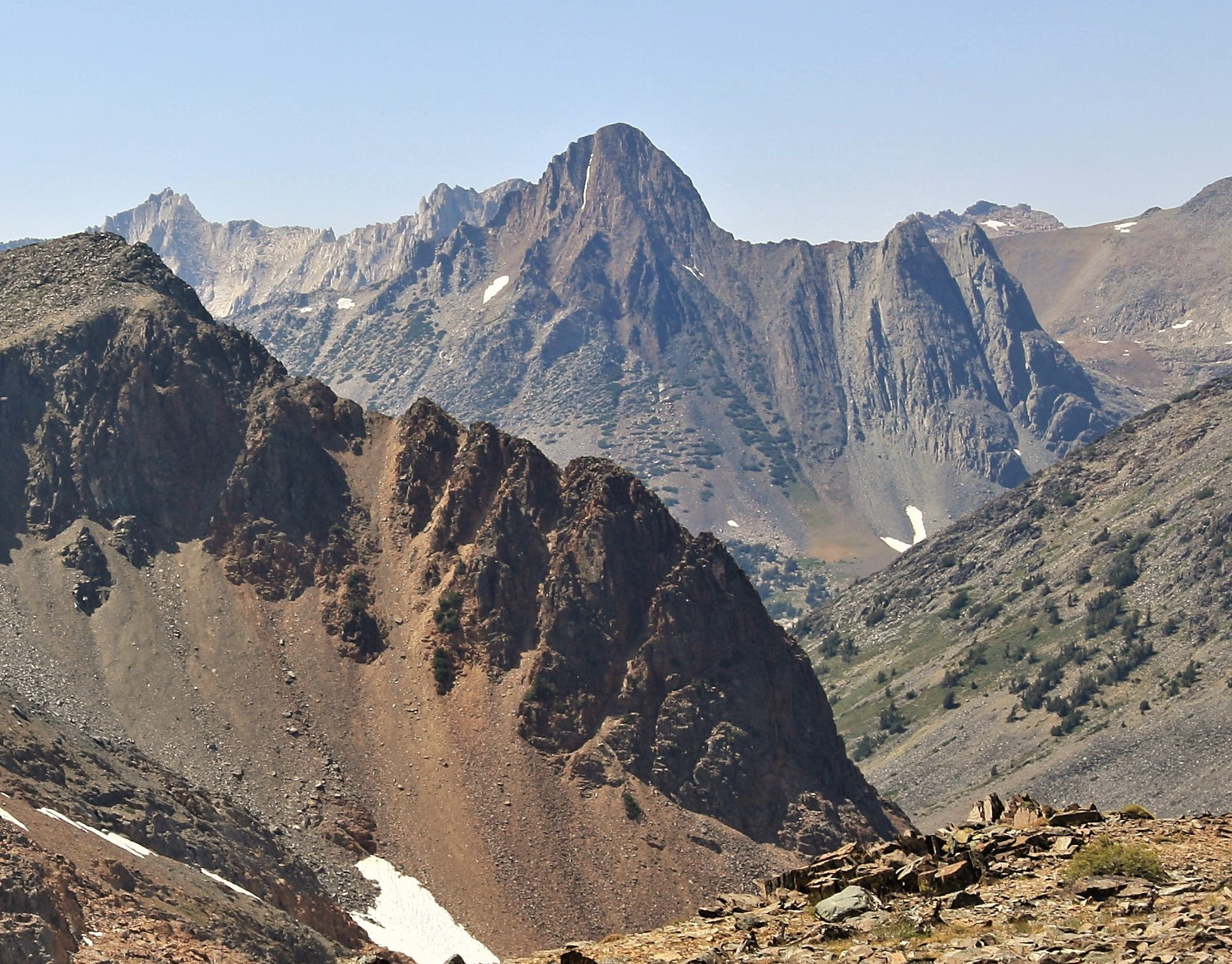
- East aspect (centered), from Black Mountain

Highest point
- Elevation: 12,002 ft (3,658 m) NAVD 88
- Prominence: 481 ft (147 m)
- Listing: Highest mountains of Yosemite NP
- Coordinates: 38°3′57″N 119°21′29″W

Geography
- Location within California Location within the United States
- Location: Yosemite National Park; Tuolumne County, California, U.S.
- Parent range: Sierra Nevada
- Topo map: USGS Dunderberg Peak

Climbing
- Easiest route: class 2 to class 3

Virginia Peak is a mountain summit in the northern part of Yosemite National Park, north of Tuolumne Meadows. It is the 25th-highest mountain in Yosemite National Park.

== Virginia Peak's particulars ==
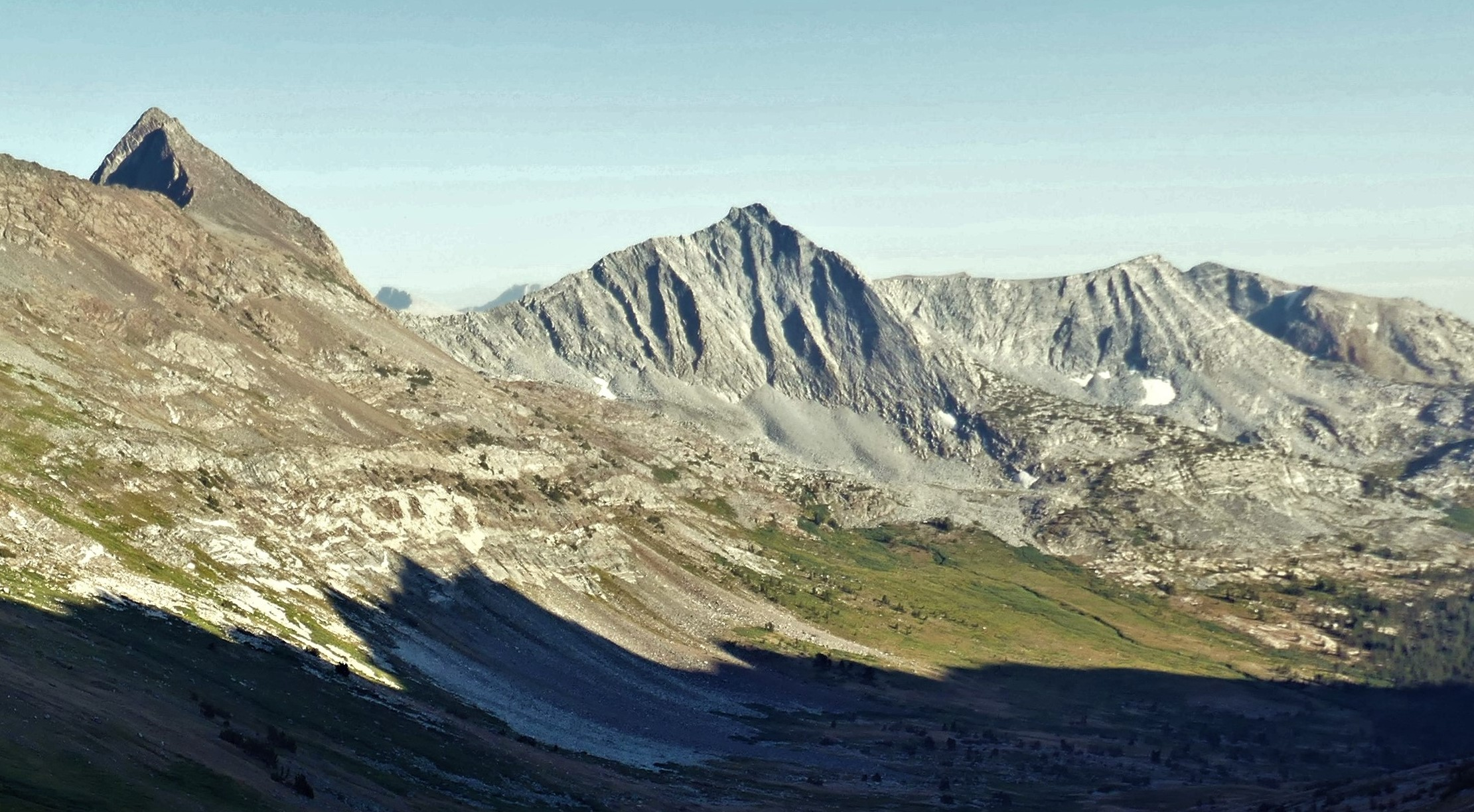
Virginia Peak (left) and Stanton Peak (centered)

Virginia Peak is in northeastern Yosemite National Park, on a north–south ridge splitting off the main Sierra crest at Twin Peaks.

Virginia Pass and Sawtooth Ridge are near, as are Whorl Mountain, Excelsior Mountain and Matterhorn Peak.

Near Virginia Pass, viewed from the east, Virginia Peak looks dark, forbidding — it is not composed of more-common Yosemite granite, but of reddish metamorphic rock, such as is found on Mount Dana and Dunderberg Peak. Of note, Virginia Peak is along the ancient boundary between the Sierra Nevada Batholith's intruding granite and pre-existing sediments, which are now metamorphosed, so-called metasediments.

== Climate ==
Virginia Peak is located in an alpine climate zone. Most weather fronts originate in the Pacific Ocean, and travel east toward the Sierra Nevada mountains. As fronts approach, they are forced upward by the peaks (orographic lift), causing moisture in the form of rain or snowfall to drop onto the range.

== See also ==
- Geology of the Yosemite area
