= Whorl (disambiguation) =

A whorl is a type of spiral pattern.

Whorl may also refer to:

- Whorl (album), a 2014 album by Simian Mobile Disco
- Whorl (botany)
- Whorl (mollusc)

== See also ==
- Whorl Mountain
