= Lee Vining Creek =

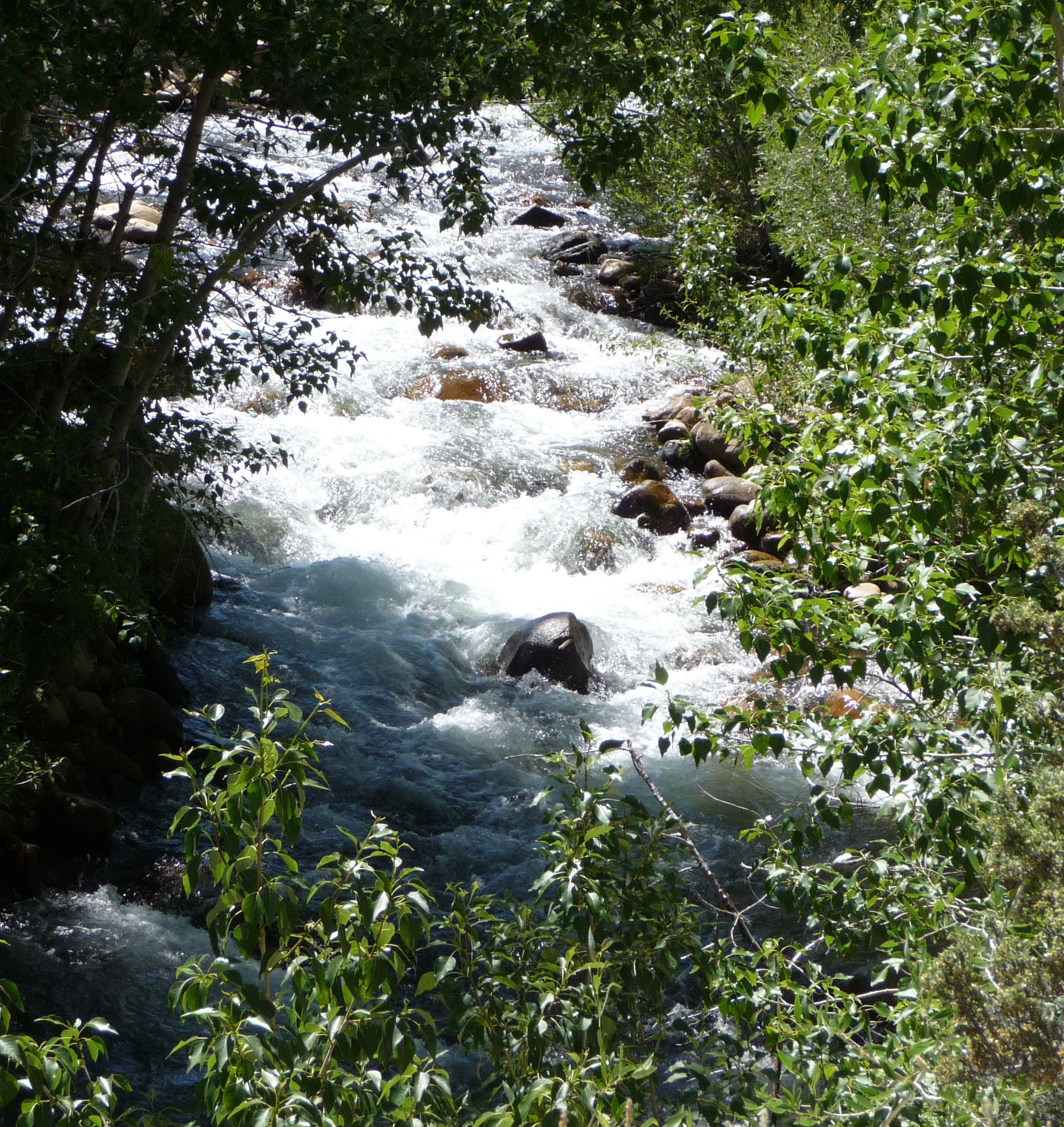
- Lee Vining Creek near Mono Lake

Location
- Country: United States
- State: California

Physical characteristics
- Source: Conness Lakes
  - location: Sierra Nevada
  - coordinates: 37°58′36″N 119°18′23″W
  - elevation: 10,617 ft (3,236 m)
- Mouth: Mono Lake
  - location: 1 mi (1.6 km) north of Lee Vining
  - coordinates: 37°58′40″N 119°06′07″W
  - elevation: 6,378 ft (1,944 m)
- Length: 16 mi (26 km), west-east
- Basin size: 36 mi^{2} (93 km^{2})
- Discharge
  - location: Lee Vining, CA
  - average: 65.4 cu ft/s (1.85 m^{3}/s)
  - minimum: 8.67 cu ft/s (0.246 m^{3}/s)
  - maximum: 590 cu ft/s (17 m^{3}/s)

Basin features
- Tributaries
  - left: Warren Fork
  - right: Mine Creek

Lee Vining Creek is a 16.2-mile-long (26.1 km) stream in Mono County, California, flowing into the endorheic basin of Mono Lake. It is the second largest stream flowing into the lake, after Rush Creek.

== Geography ==
The stream rises near Tioga Pass in the Eastern Sierra Nevada, more than 10,000 feet (3,000 m) above sea level, in the Hoover Wilderness of the Inyo National Forest just outside the eastern boundary of Yosemite National Park. The headwaters of the creek consist of many high-altitude lakes, Saddlebag Lake being the largest, as well as permanent snowfields and the Conness Glacier. It flows southeast to Ellery Lake, a natural lake enlarged by a dam, where it turns east and drops over Ellery Lake Falls into the deep Lee Vining Canyon. From there, it flows eastwards out of the mountains past the small town of Lee Vining. The creek terminates at a small sandy delta on the western shore of Mono Lake.

== Human use ==
The Lee Vining Canyon provides the route for California State Route 120 (Tioga Pass Road), the main road crossing Yosemite. Due to the ruggedness of the area, the construction of the road along the sheer canyon walls during the 1930s was the most difficult part of the trans-Sierra crossing. Route 120 joins U.S. Route 395 in Lee Vining just north of the US 395 bridge over Lee Vining Creek.

The creek is used for hydropower generation at the Poole power plant operated by Southern California Edison, located within Lee Vining Canyon. Water impounded by dams at Ellery (formerly Rhinedollar) and Saddlebag Lakes are released to generate power over a total drop of 1,700 feet (520 m). The original hydroelectric system, developed by Nevada-California Power Company in the 1920s, was larger and consisted of three power plants known as Lee Vining Nos. 1, 2 and 3. Today, only Lee Vining No. 1 remains operational.

A portion of the creek is diverted into the Second Los Angeles Aqueduct near Lee Vining to provide water to metropolitan Southern California. The diversion of Lee Vining Creek and other streams such as Rush Creek and Mill Creek has led to a severe reduction in streamflow and a drop in lake level, damaging the fragile ecosystem of the lake.

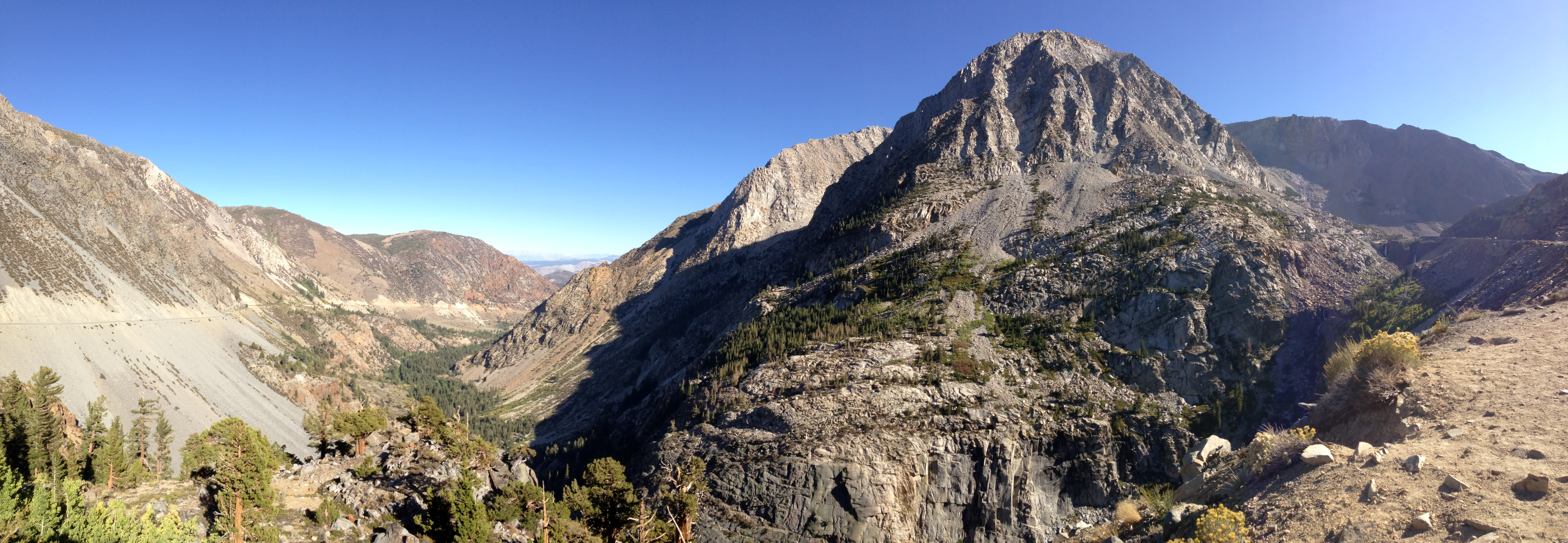
Lee Vining Canyon

== See also ==
- Inyo National Forest
- List of rivers of California
