= North Peak (California) =

Mountain in California, United States

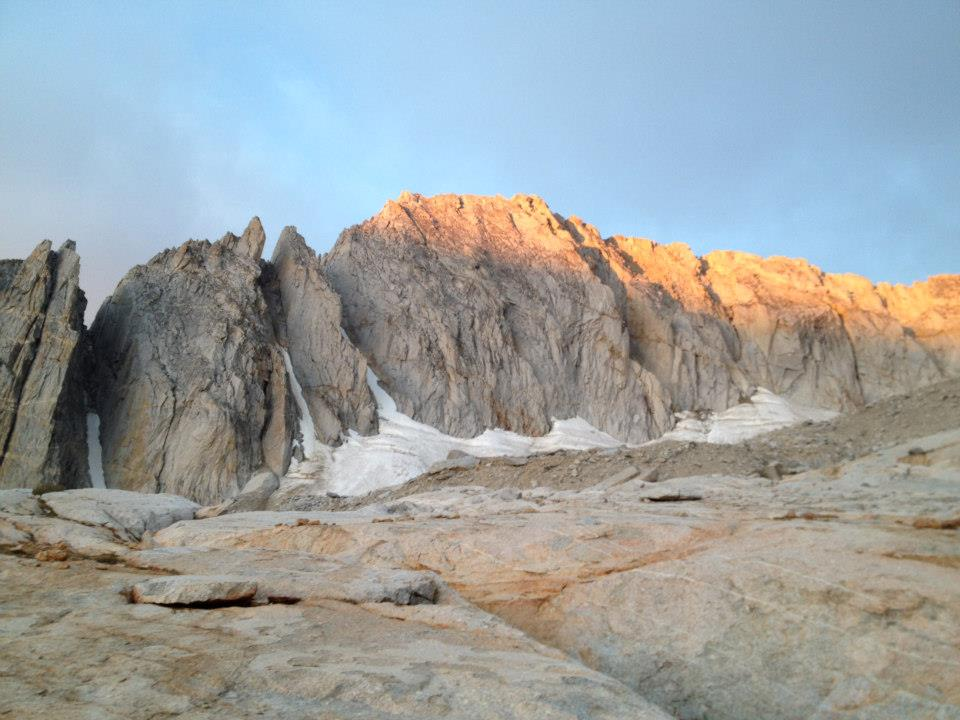
- North Peak from the East

Highest point
- Elevation: 12,248 ft (3,733 m) NAVD 88
- Prominence: 682 ft (208 m)
- Listing: Sierra Peaks Section
- Coordinates: 37°58′56″N 119°18′53″W

Geography
- Location within California
- Location: Tuolumne County, California, U.S.
- Parent range: Sierra Nevada
- Topo map: USGS Tioga Pass

Climbing
- Easiest route: Scramble, class 2

North Peak is an alpine peak just north of Mount Conness in the Sierra Nevada. The summit is to the west of the Hall Natural Area and on the boundary between the Inyo National Forest and Yosemite National Park. North Peak is in Tuolumne County in eastern California in the southwestern United States.

== Gallery ==
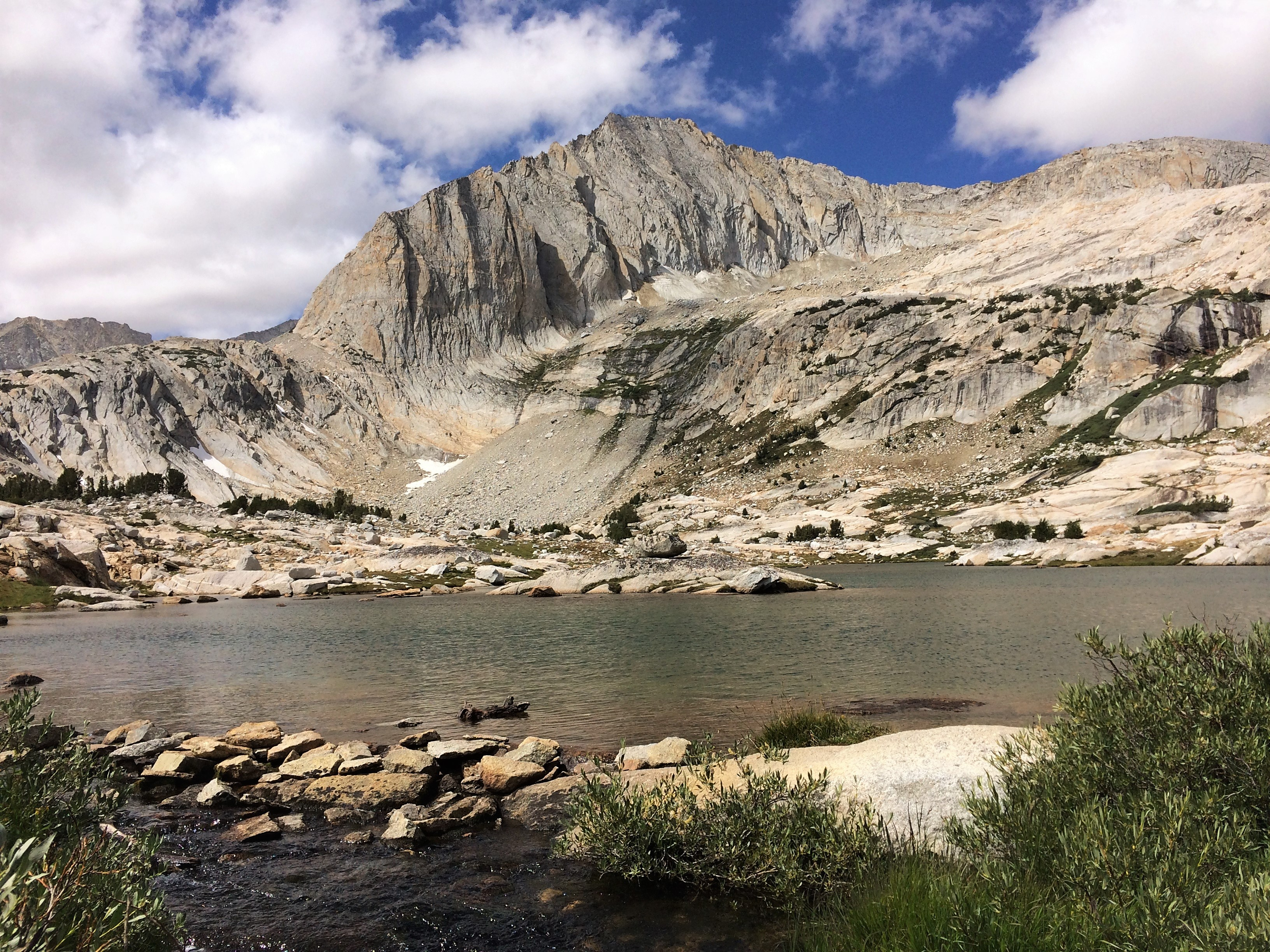
Northeast aspect

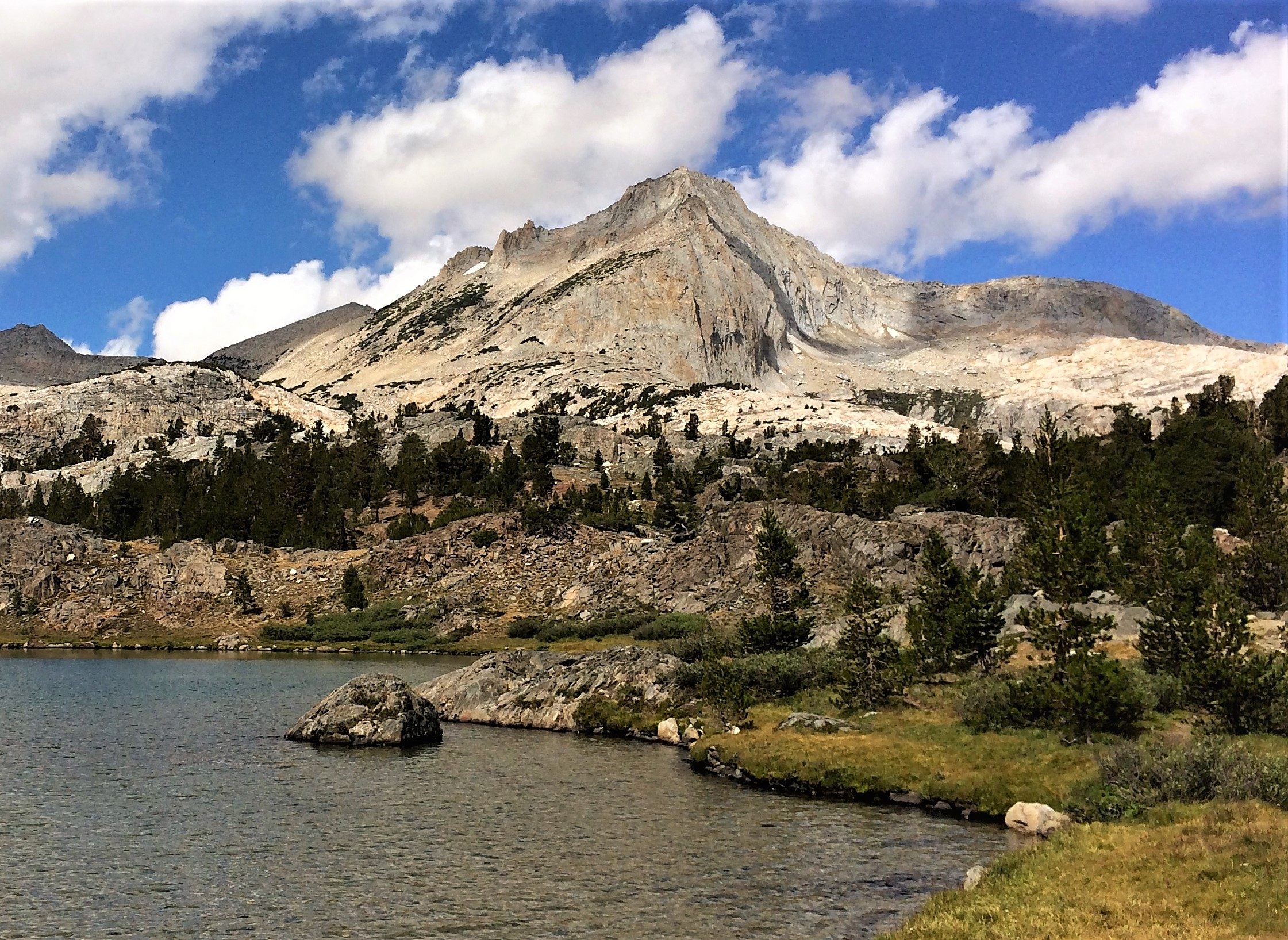
East aspect

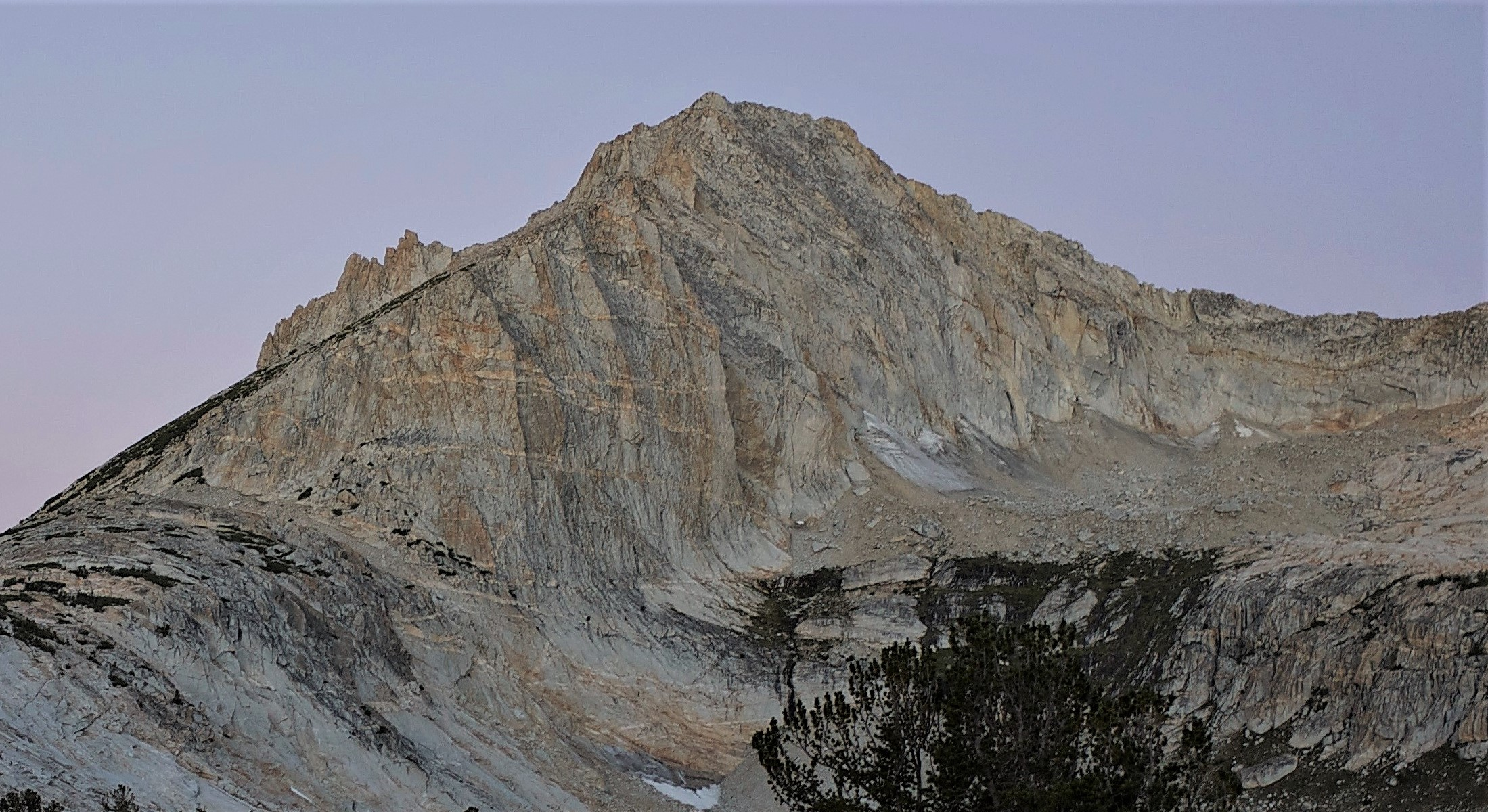
Before dawn

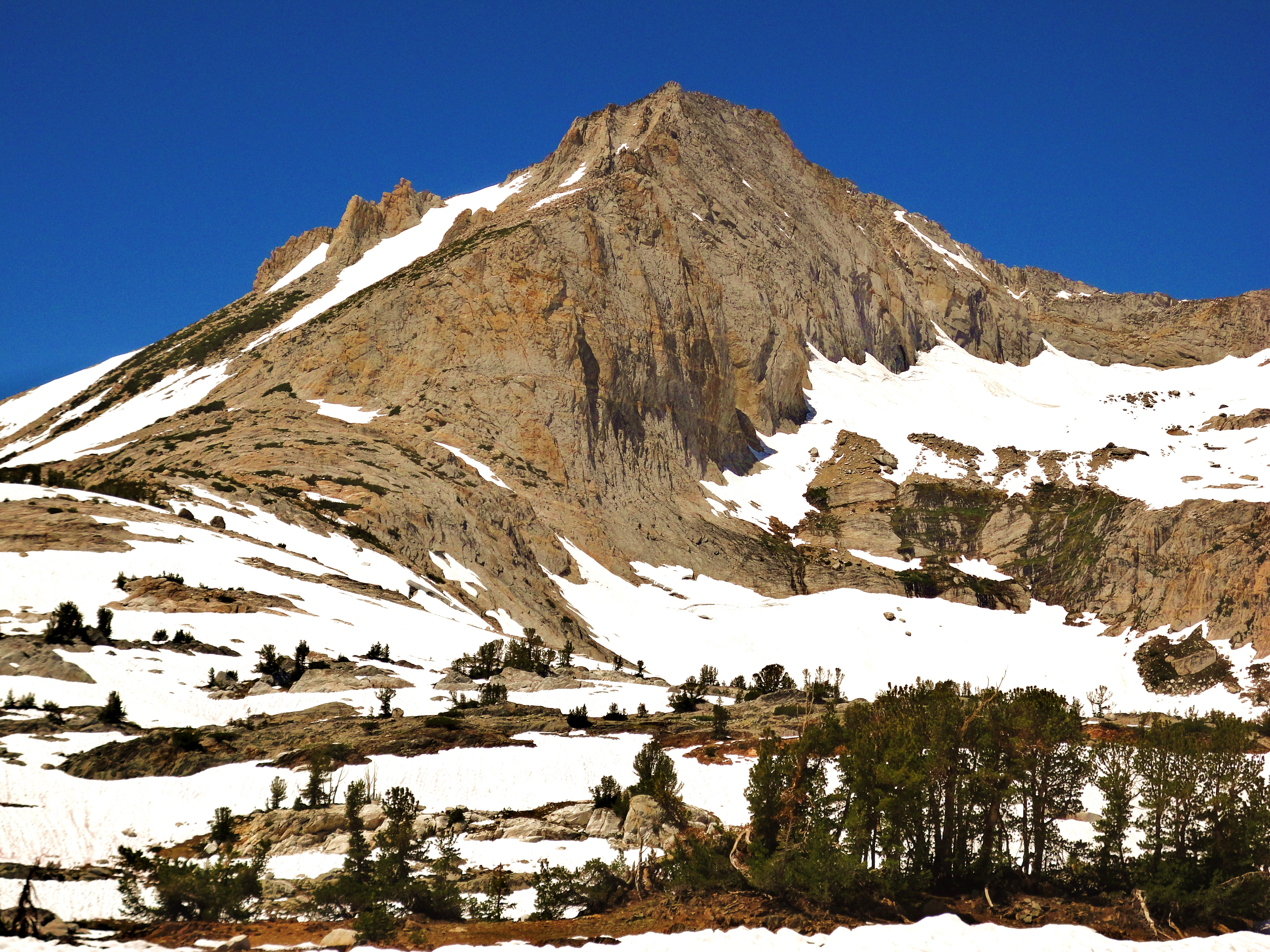
East aspect

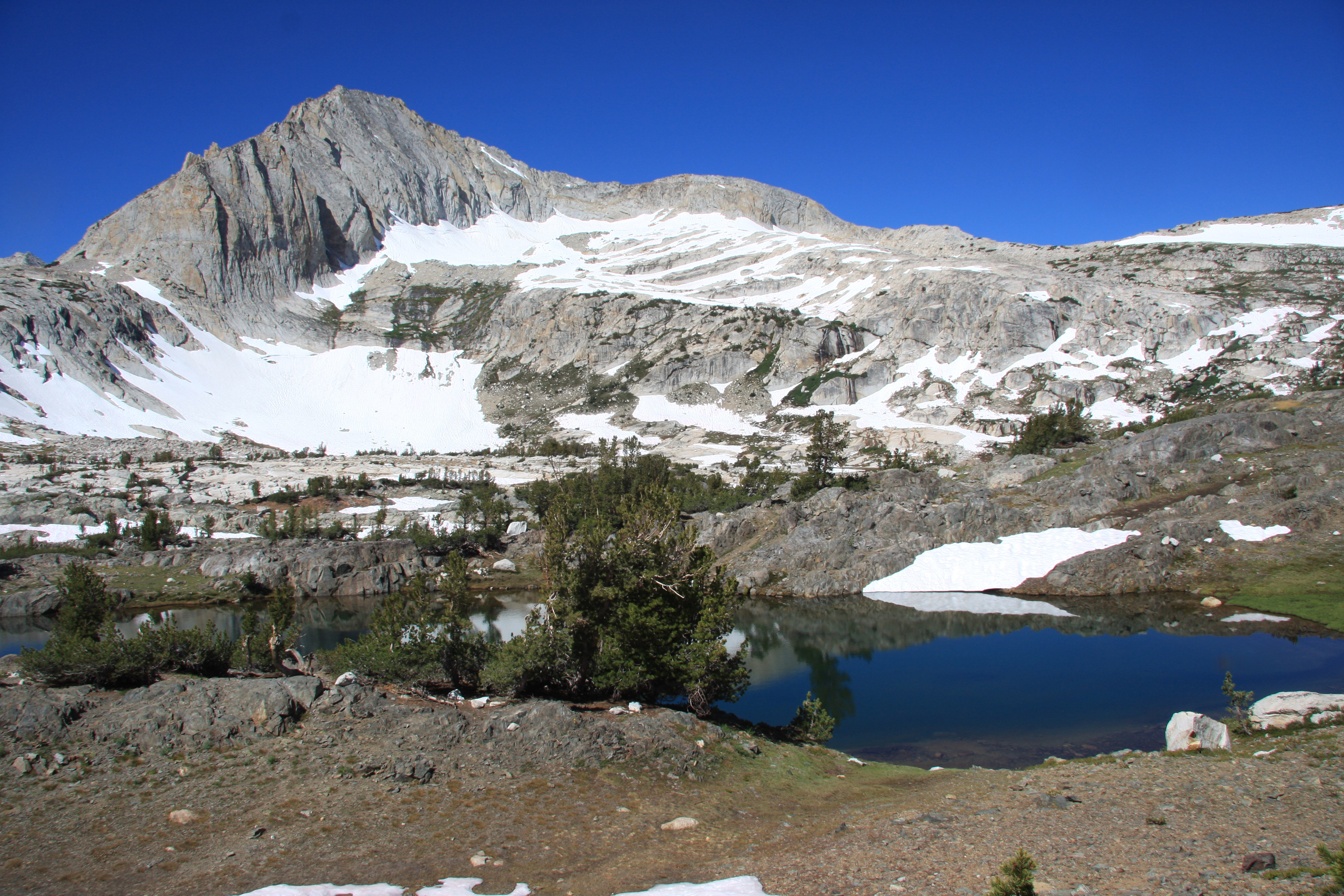
