= Hall Natural Area =

Coordinates: 37.958°N 119.296°W

The Hall Natural Area or Harvey Monroe Hall Natural Area is a region on the eastern border of Yosemite National Park in California. The area is located about 1.25 miles (2.0 km) northwest of Tioga Pass, and is approximately four miles (6.4 km) long from north to south and 2.75 miles (4.4 km) wide at its widest point. It lies completely within the Inyo National Forest.

== Geography ==
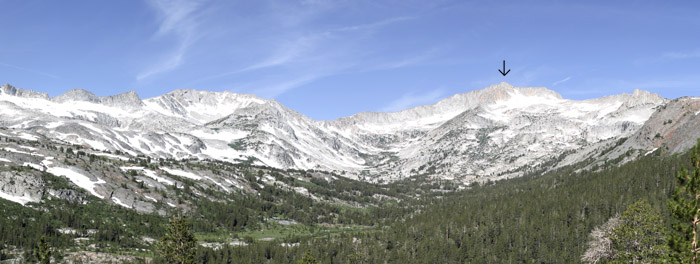
A view of the Hall Natural Area, with Mount Conness under the arrow.

The Natural Area covers 3,883 acres (1,571 ha). Elevations range from 9,600 feet (2,900 m) along Lee Vining Creek to 12,590 feet (3,840 m) atop Mount Conness. The entire area is drained by Lee Vining Creek, which flows from northwest to southeast. Glaciation strongly affected the topography. Several deeply glaciated northeast-facing cirques are present, with steep headwalls and flats or lakes at their floors. Much of the lower elevation area is stepped topography resulting from differential erosion along jointing planes in the granitic bedrock.

The climate is high Sierran montane with copious winter snowfall. Average annual precipitation is estimated to be more than 25 inches (640 mm). There is great variation in temperature and growing season.

== History and purpose ==
The Research Natural Area (RNA) program is a nationwide system created to protect a network of federally administered public lands for the primary purposes of maintaining biological diversity, providing baseline ecological information, and encouraging research and university natural history education. In California, the RNA program is administered jointly by the USDA Forest Service Pacific Southwest Research Station and Pacific Southwest Region

The Hall Natural Area was one of the first established in California (in 1933). The Carnegie Institution of Washington’s studies on genotype-environment interactions made much use of the transplant gardens at the south end of the Natural Area. Since then, other researchers have used the area, studying social organization of Belding ground squirrels, dynamics of wind-blown detritus in snow banks, and community structuring of subalpine forest birds.
