= Conness Lakes =

Lake in the state of California, United States

Coordinates: 37.976°N 119.307°W

- Interactive map of Conness Lakes
- Location: Mono County, California, United States
- Type: Glacial lakes
- Basin countries: United States

The Conness Lakes are a group of small lakes at the foot of Conness Glacier in Mono County, California, in the United States.

The Conness Lakes are named for John Conness, a United States Senator from California.

== See also ==
- List of lakes in California
