= Whorl Mountain =

Mountain in northern Yosemite National Park

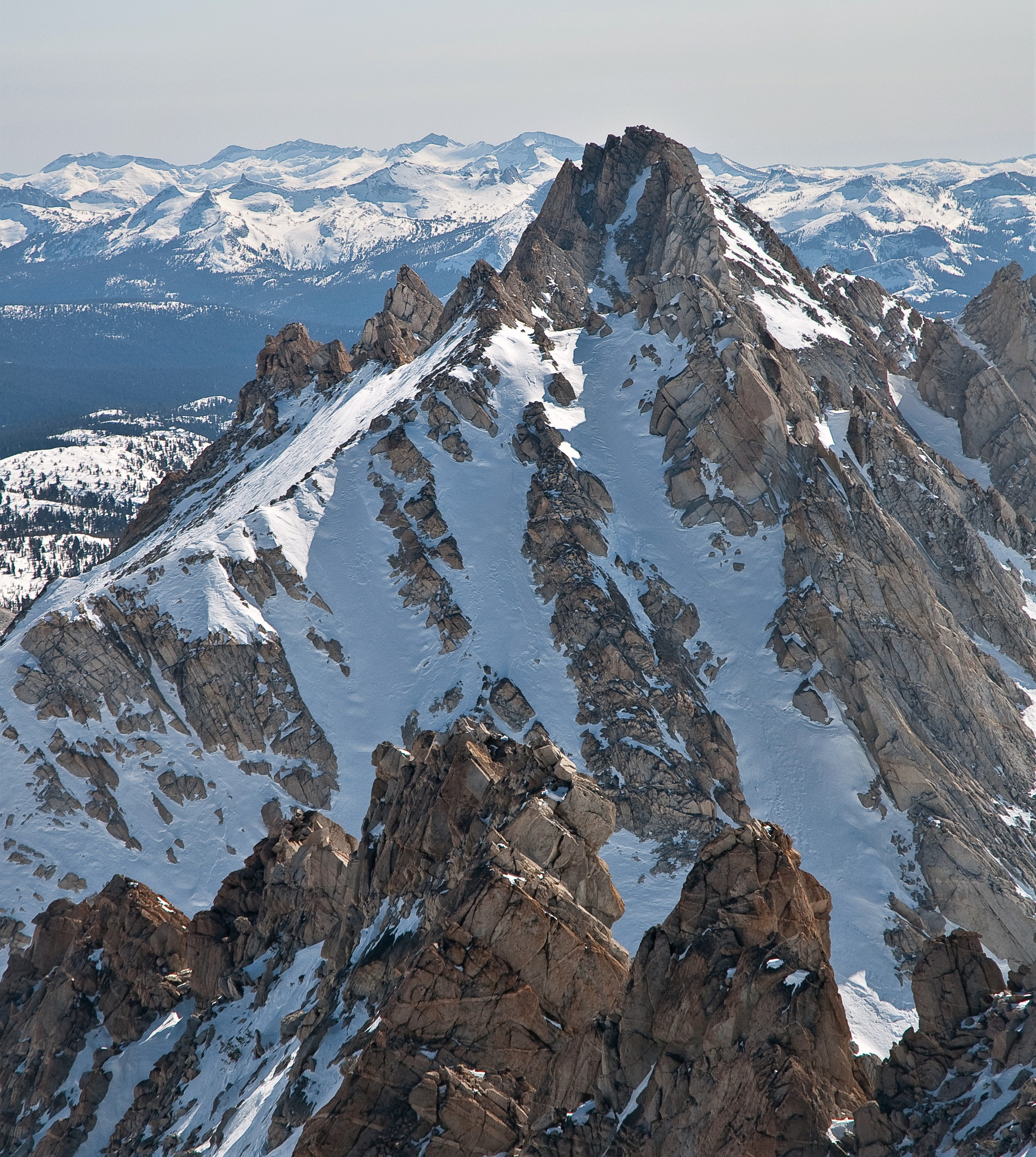
- North aspect, from Matterhorn Peak

Highest point
- Elevation: 12,039 ft (3,669 m) NAVD 88
- Prominence: 673 ft (205 m)
- Listing: Highest mountains of Yosemite NP
- Coordinates: 38°04′27″N 119°23′00″W

Geography
- Location within California Location within the United States
- Country: United States
- State: California
- County: Tuolumne
- Protected area: Yosemite National Park
- Parent range: Ritter Range
- Topo map: USGS Matterhorn Peak

Climbing
- First ascent: July 9, 1933 by Herbert Blanks, Kenneth May and Eliot Sawyer
- Easiest route: Exposed scramble, class 3.

Whorl Mountain is a mountain in the northern part of Yosemite National Park, well north of Mount Conness, and barely inside the boundary of Yosemite. Whorl Mountain is the 22nd-highest mountain in Yosemite National Park.

Whorl Mountain is 1.3 miles (2.1 km) south of Matterhorn Peak. Bath Mountain is 4.6 miles (7.4 km) west-south-west, and Excelsior Mountain is 5.5 miles (8.9 km) to the southeast.

== On climbing Whorl Mountain ==
Whorl Mountain is a class 3 climb.

== Gallery ==
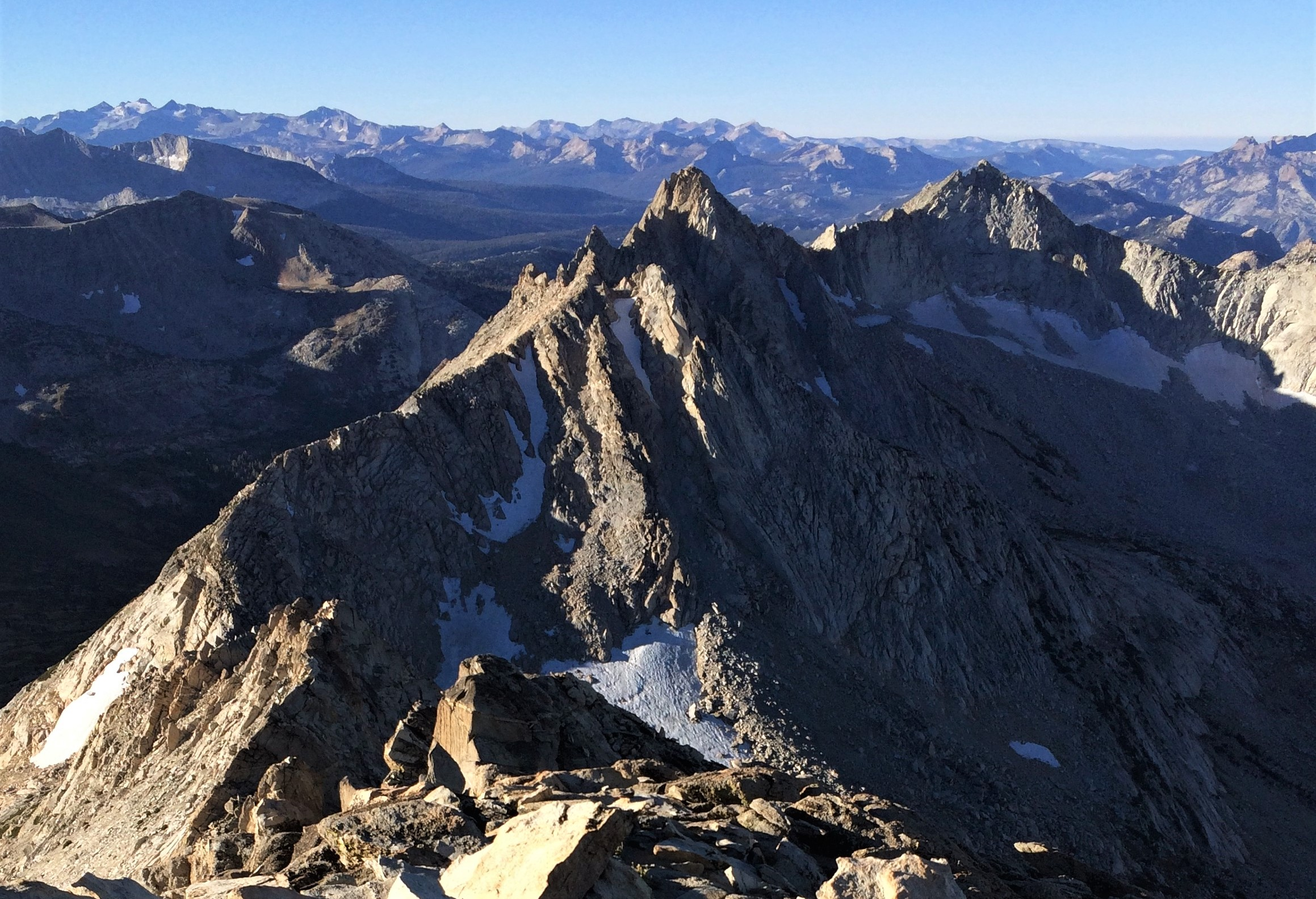

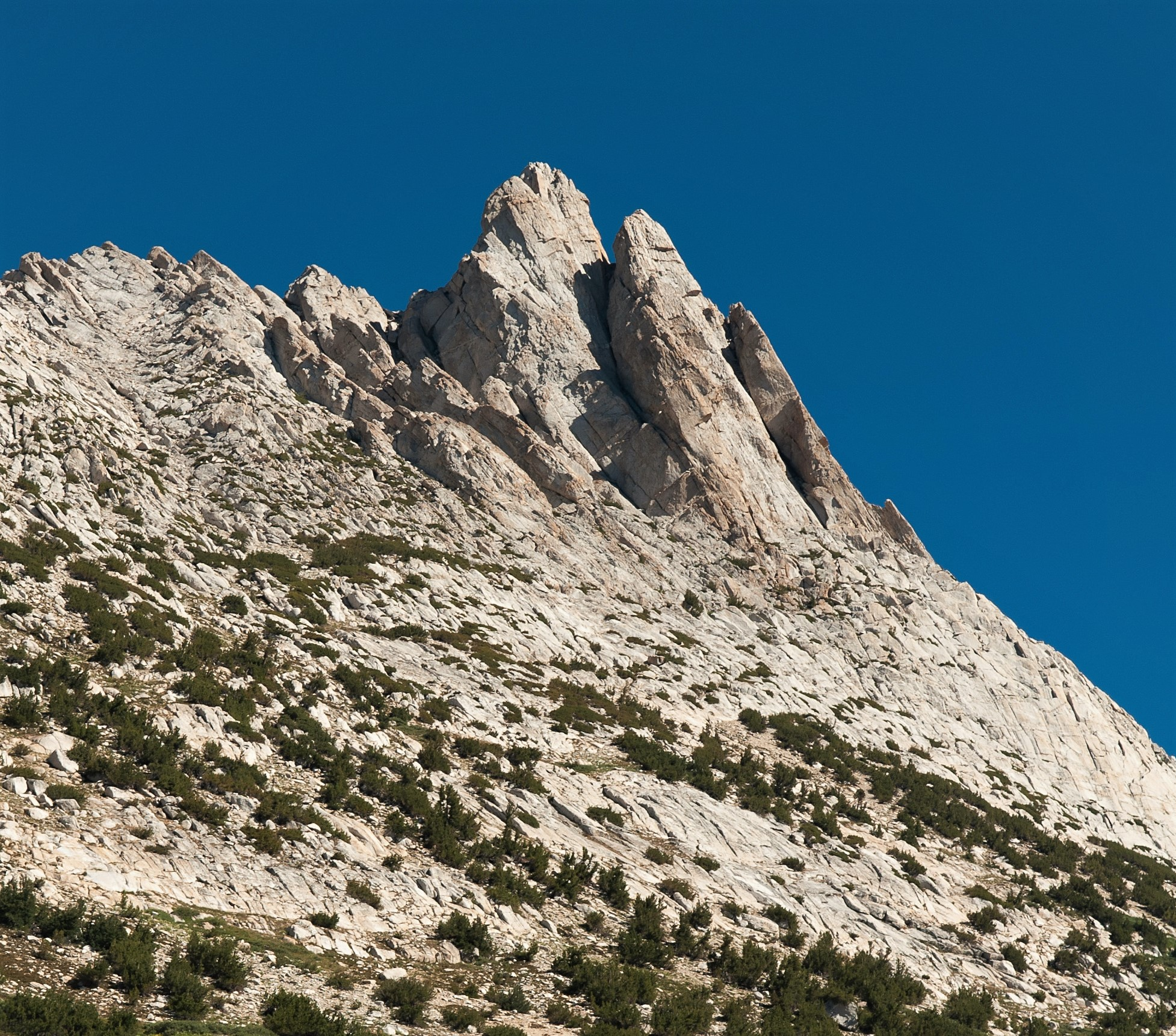
Whorl Mountain summit

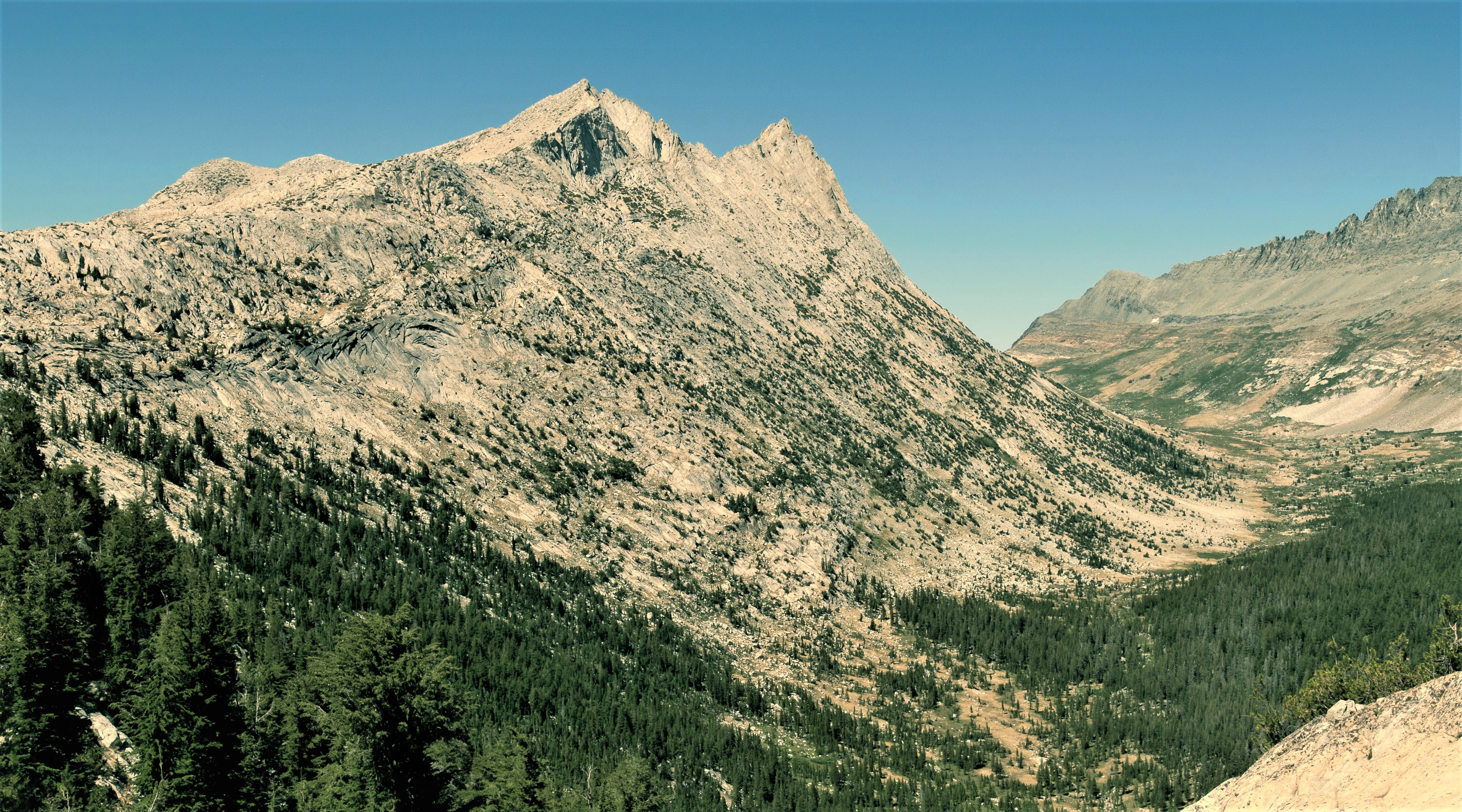
South aspect
