= Conness Glacier =

Glacier in California, United States

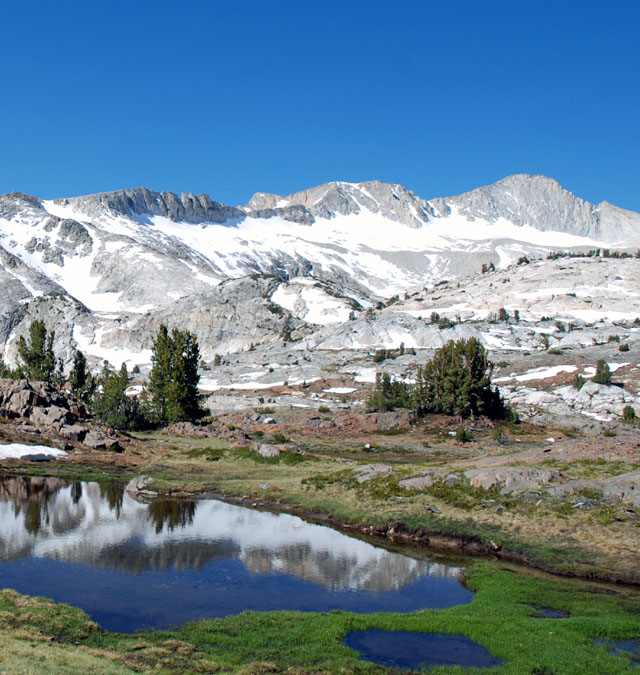
- Coness Glacier, below and to the left of Mount Conness, the highest point visible

- Location within California
- Type: Mountain glacier
- Location: Mount Conness, Mono County, California, United States
- Coordinates: 37°58′13″N 119°19′07″W
- Length: .15 mi (0.24 km)
- Terminus: Talus
- Status: Retreating

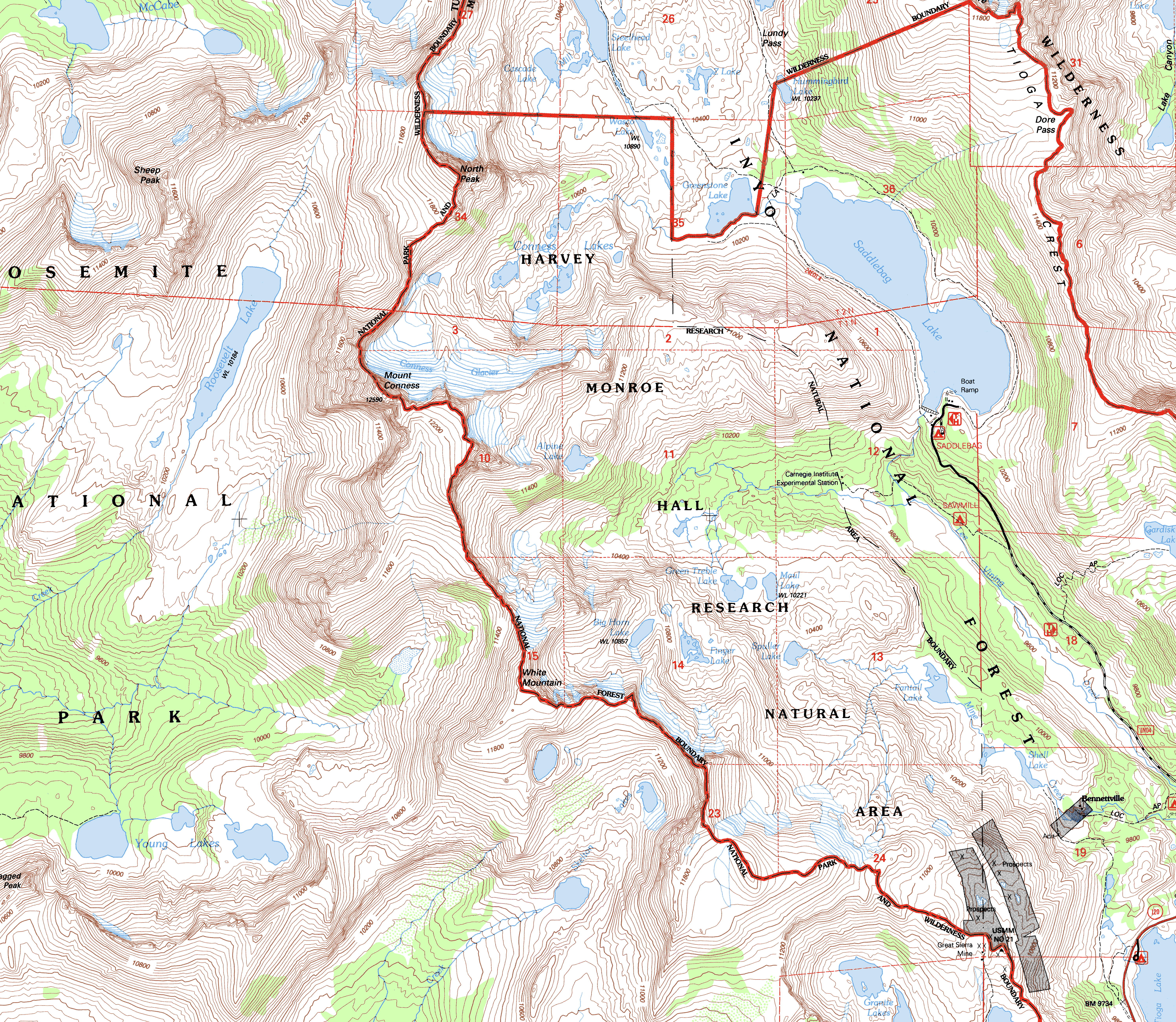
Map of the Mount Conness area

The Conness Glacier is on the steep northeast cirque of Mount Conness, east of the Sierra Nevada crest, in the U.S. state of California. The glacier is situated at about 11,548 feet (3,520 m) and can be seen from Saddlebag Lake to the east. The glacier is the largest glacier in the Sierra Nevada north of Tioga Pass or Highway 120.

== See also ==
- List of glaciers

== External links and references ==
- Disappearing California Glaciers
- A map of Conness Glacier
