= Matterhorn Peak =

Mountain in Sierra Nevada, California

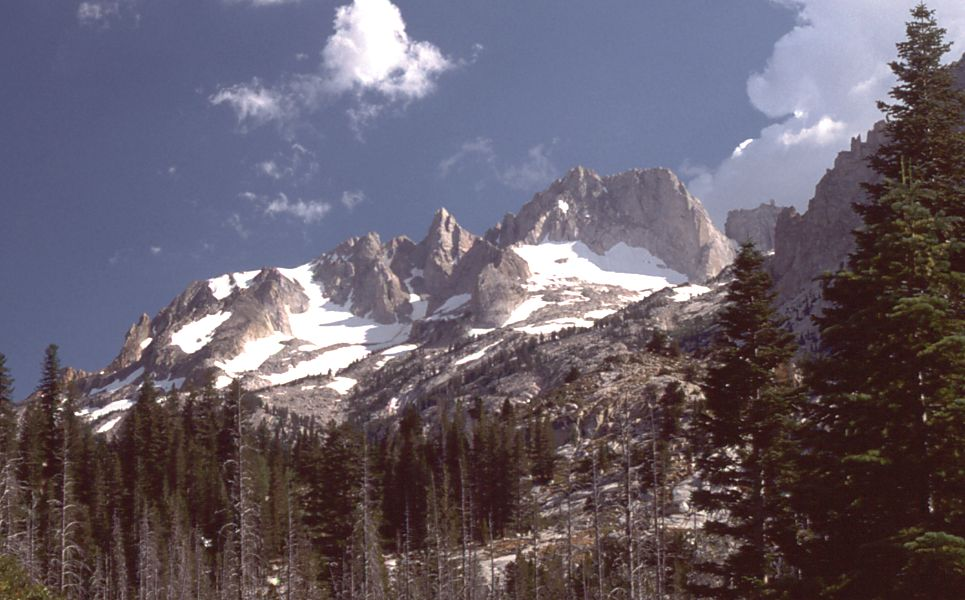
- Looking west from Horse Creek

Highest point
- Elevation: 12,285 ft (3,744 m) NAVD 88
- Prominence: 1,559 ft (475 m)
- Parent peak: Twin Peaks
- Listing: SPS Emblem peak; Vagmarken Club Sierra Crest List; Western States Climbers Star peak
- Coordinates: 38°05′35″N 119°22′54″W

Geography
- Location within California
- Location: Mono and Tuolumne counties, California, U.S.
- Parent range: Sierra Nevada
- Topo map: USGS Matterhorn Peak

Climbing
- First ascent: 1899 by M. R. Dempster and party
- Easiest route: Scramble, class 2

Matterhorn Peak is located in the Sierra Nevada, in California, at the northern boundary of Yosemite National Park. At 12,285 feet (3,744 m) elevation, it is the tallest peak in the craggy Alps-like Sawtooth Ridge and the northernmost 12,000-foot (3,700 m) peak in the Sierra Nevada. The peak also supports the Sierra's northernmost glacier system. It was named after the Matterhorn in the Alps. Matterhorn Peak is near Twin Peaks, and just north of Whorl Mountain.

The peak can be ascended without climbing gear.

== In popular culture ==
Jack Kerouac, in The Dharma Bums (1958), describes a hike up and a run down the mountain. This led to the classic observation, "You can't fall off a mountain."

== Climate ==
Climate data for Matterhorn Peak (CA) 38.0964 N, 119.3825 W, Elevation: 11,585 ft (3,531 m) (1991–2020 normals)
Month	Jan	Feb	Mar	Apr	May	Jun	Jul	Aug	Sep	Oct	Nov	Dec	Year
Mean daily maximum °F (°C)	31.3 (−0.4)	29.5 (−1.4)	32.2 (0.1)	35.9 (2.2)	43.5 (6.4)	53.1 (11.7)	61.0 (16.1)	60.3 (15.7)	55.0 (12.8)	45.8 (7.7)	36.7 (2.6)	30.7 (−0.7)	42.9 (6.1)
Daily mean °F (°C)	21.3 (−5.9)	19.5 (−6.9)	21.8 (−5.7)	24.7 (−4.1)	31.8 (−0.1)	41.1 (5.1)	48.8 (9.3)	48.1 (8.9)	42.3 (5.7)	34.3 (1.3)	26.8 (−2.9)	21.3 (−5.9)	31.8 (−0.1)
Mean daily minimum °F (°C)	11.4 (−11.4)	9.5 (−12.5)	11.3 (−11.5)	13.5 (−10.3)	20.1 (−6.6)	29.0 (−1.7)	36.6 (2.6)	35.8 (2.1)	29.6 (−1.3)	22.7 (−5.2)	16.8 (−8.4)	12.0 (−11.1)	20.7 (−6.3)
Average precipitation inches (mm)	9.29 (236)	8.06 (205)	7.27 (185)	3.97 (101)	2.40 (61)	0.69 (18)	0.79 (20)	0.69 (18)	0.58 (15)	2.54 (65)	4.19 (106)	8.11 (206)	48.58 (1,236)
Source: PRISM Climate Group

== See also ==
- Hoover Wilderness
- Matterhorn
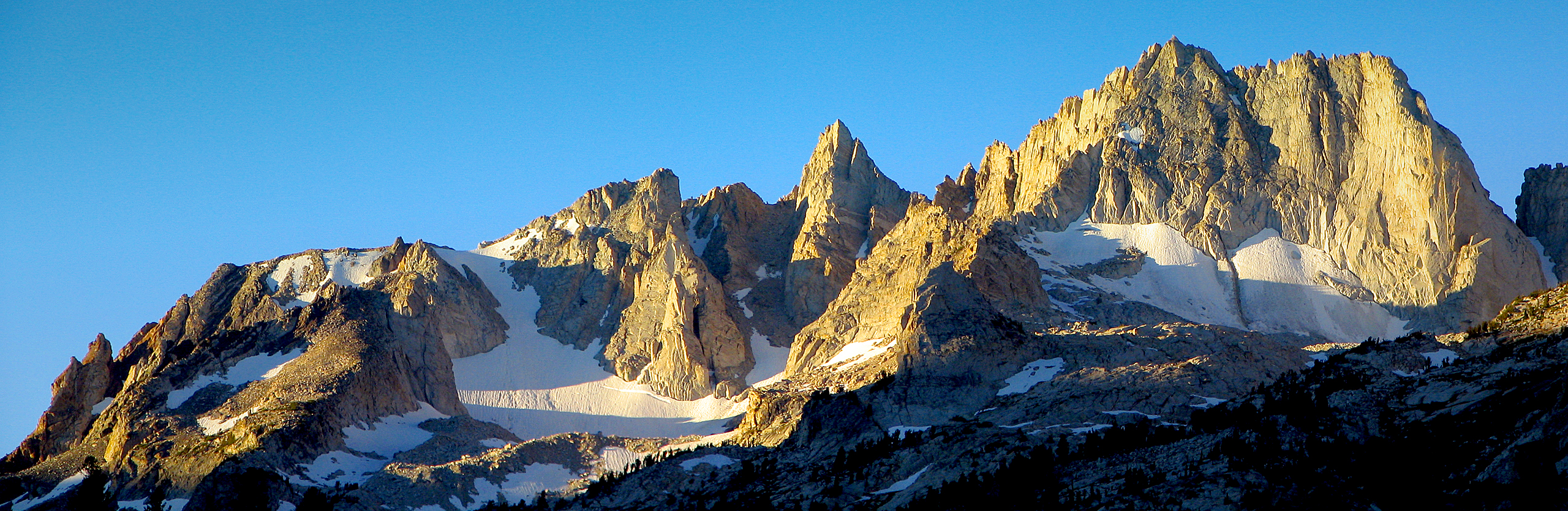
Matterhorn Peak
