= Mount Conness =

Mountain in California, US

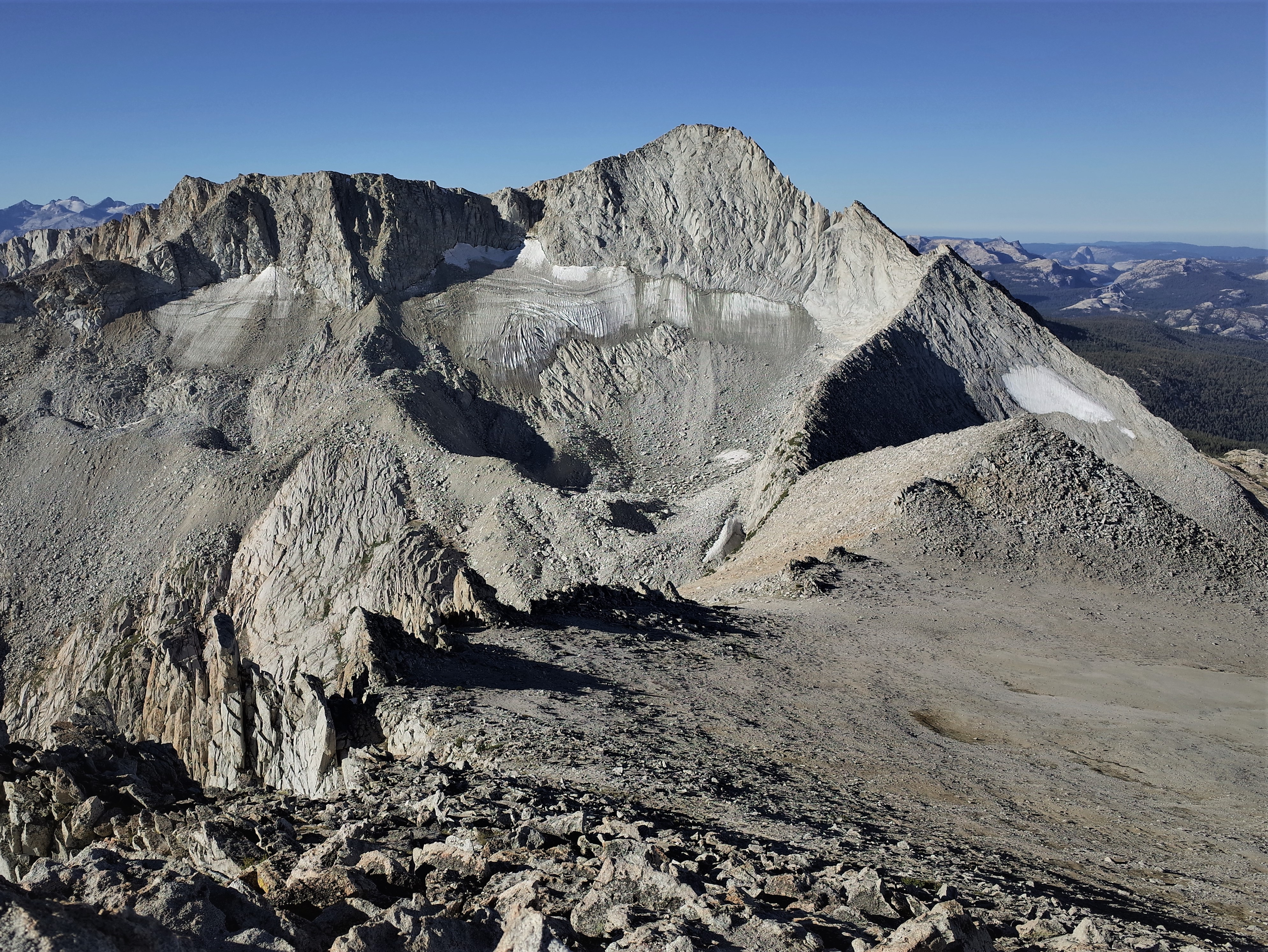
- from the south, showing Conness Glacier

Highest point
- Elevation: 12,590 ft (3,840 m) NAVD 88
- Prominence: 2,630 ft (802 m)
- Parent peak: Mount Dana
- Listing: Sierra Peaks Section; California highest major peaks 19th
- Coordinates: 37°58′01″N 119°19′17″W

Geography
- Location within California
- Location: Mono / Tuolumne counties, California, U.S.
- Parent range: Sierra Nevada
- Topo map: USGS Tioga Pass

Climbing
- First ascent: 1864 by Clarence King and James T. Gardiner
- Easiest route: Scramble, class 2

Mount Conness is a 12,590 foot (3,840 m) mountain in the Sierra Nevada range, to the west of the Hall Natural Area. Conness is on the boundary between the Inyo National Forest and Yosemite National Park. The Conness Glacier lies north of the summit.

== History ==
Mount Conness is named for John Conness (1821–1909), a native of Ireland who came to United States in 1836. Conness was a member of California legislature (1853–1854, 1860–1861) and the United States Senator from California (1863–1869). He resided in Massachusetts from 1869 until his death in 1909.

In 1860 Josiah Dwight Whitney Jr. was appointed State Geologist of California and he organized the California Geological Survey (1863–1870). Whitney, along with William H. Brewer, Clarence King, James T. Gardiner, Charles F. Hoffmann, Lorenzo G. Yates, Richard D. Cotter and others, made an extensive survey of California, including the Sierra Nevada and Yosemite region. Whitney wrote:

"Mount Conness bears the name of a distinguished citizen of California, now a United States Senator, who deserves more than any other person, the credit of carrying the bill, organizing the Geological Survey of California, through the Legislature, and who is chiefly to be credited for another great scientific work, the Survey of the 40th Parallel."

Clarence King, a geologist for the Survey and the first to ascend Mount Conness along with James T. Gardiner in 1864, wrote:

"I recognized the old familiar summit... and that firm peak with titan strength and brow so square and solid, it seems altogether natural we should have named it for California’s statesman, John Conness."

== Climate ==
Climate data for Mount Conness 37.9667 N, 119.3129 W, Elevation: 11,903 ft (3,628 m) (1991–2020 normals)
Month	Jan	Feb	Mar	Apr	May	Jun	Jul	Aug	Sep	Oct	Nov	Dec	Year
Mean daily maximum °F (°C)	29.5 (−1.4)	28.8 (−1.8)	31.6 (−0.2)	35.4 (1.9)	42.7 (5.9)	52.2 (11.2)	59.9 (15.5)	59.2 (15.1)	53.9 (12.2)	45.1 (7.3)	35.8 (2.1)	29.6 (−1.3)	42.0 (5.5)
Daily mean °F (°C)	19.9 (−6.7)	18.4 (−7.6)	20.7 (−6.3)	23.9 (−4.5)	30.9 (−0.6)	40.4 (4.7)	47.8 (8.8)	47.1 (8.4)	41.7 (5.4)	33.5 (0.8)	25.4 (−3.7)	19.6 (−6.9)	30.8 (−0.7)
Mean daily minimum °F (°C)	10.4 (−12.0)	8.0 (−13.3)	9.8 (−12.3)	12.3 (−10.9)	19.1 (−7.2)	28.6 (−1.9)	35.8 (2.1)	35.0 (1.7)	29.5 (−1.4)	22.0 (−5.6)	15.0 (−9.4)	9.7 (−12.4)	19.6 (−6.9)
Average precipitation inches (mm)	8.92 (227)	7.78 (198)	7.32 (186)	3.69 (94)	2.21 (56)	0.75 (19)	0.66 (17)	0.50 (13)	0.65 (17)	2.32 (59)	3.64 (92)	7.51 (191)	45.95 (1,169)
Source: PRISM Climate Group

== Climbing ==
Conness is a training ground for alpine climbing since it utilizes many aspects of mountaineering: trails, scrambling, and glacier trekking; all at a high altitude for California. Usually climbers camp near Tioga Pass and begin the climb at dawn. It takes about a full day to summit.

The summit block consists of class 2 scrambling along a knife edge ridge leading to the summit consisting of views to the east of the Conness Glacier and to the west toward Tuolumne Meadows.

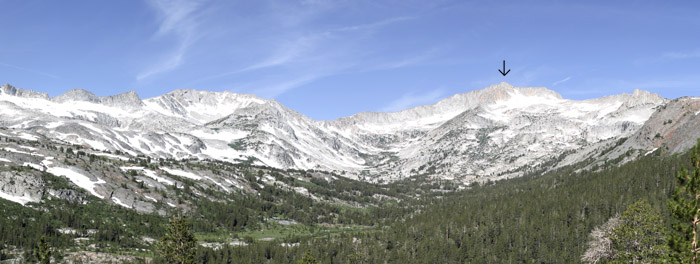
Mount Conness seen from Saddlebag Lake Road.
