= Mount Scowden =

Mountain of Mono County, California

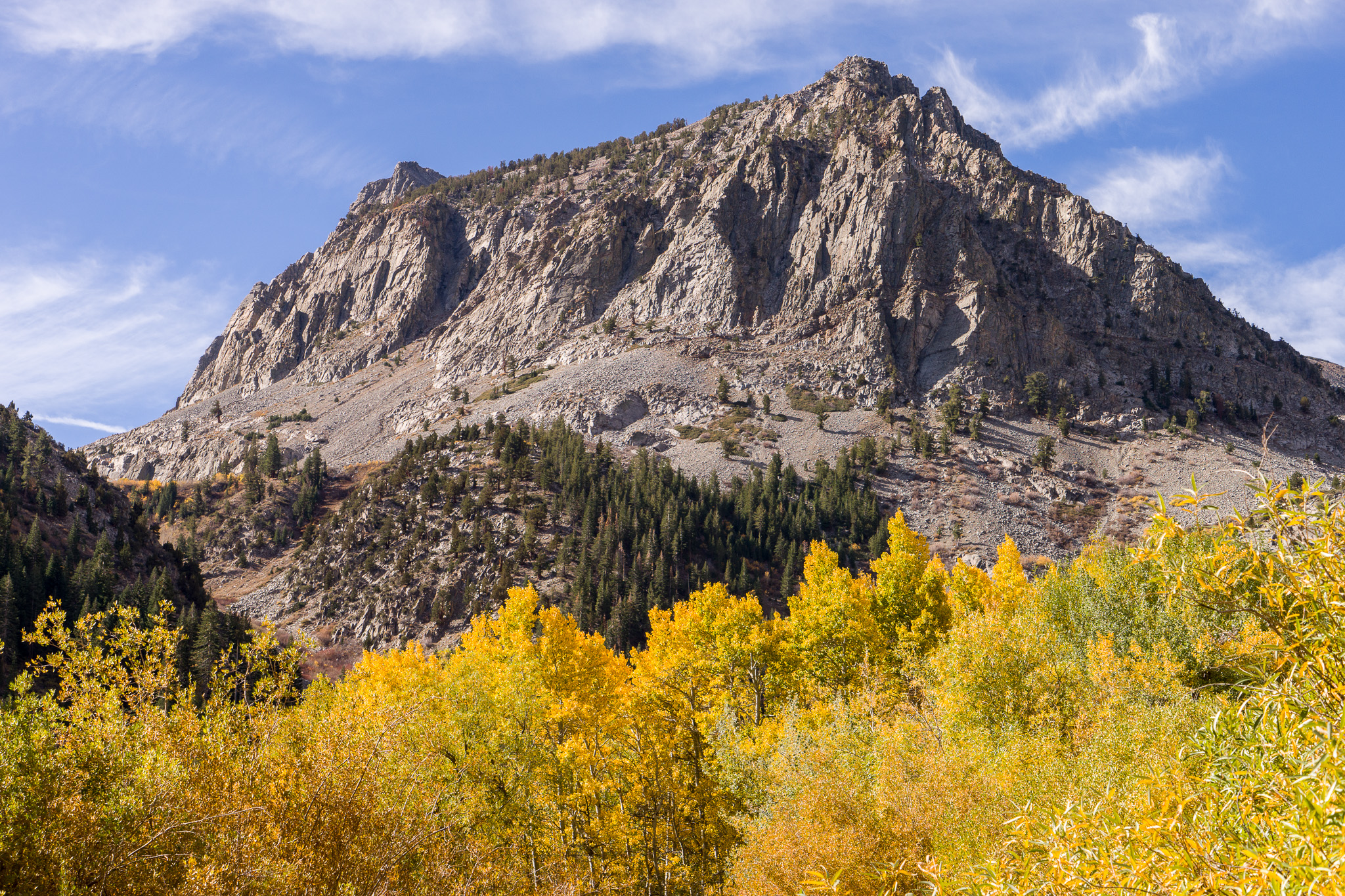
- Northeast aspect

Highest point
- Elevation: 11,182 ft (3,408 m)
- Prominence: 123 ft (37 m)
- Parent peak: Tioga Crest (11,911 ft)
- Isolation: 1.04 mi (1.67 km)
- Coordinates: 38°00′30″N 119°15′37″W

Geography
- Location within California Location within the United States
- Location: Mono County, California, U.S.
- Parent range: Sierra Nevada
- Topo map: USGS Dunderberg Peak

Geology
- Rock age: Triassic to Permian
- Rock type(s): Andesite, Metavolcanic rock

Mount Scowden is an 11,182-foot-elevation (3,408-meter) summit located in the Sierra Nevada mountain range, in Mono County of northern California, United States. The mountain is set less than three miles east of the Sierra crest, within the Hoover Wilderness, on land managed by Inyo National Forest. Mount Scowden is situated in Lundy Canyon, one mile north of line parent Tioga Crest, 1.6 miles (2.6 km) west of Gilcrest Peak, and 2.5 miles (4.0 km) southeast of Black Mountain. Topographic relief is significant as the summit rises 2,900 feet (880 meters) above Mill Creek in one mile. Precipitation runoff from this mountain drains to Mill Creek, and ultimately Mono Lake. The mountain's toponym has been officially adopted by the United States Board on Geographic Names and has been in publications since at least 1882. Leo A. Scowden (born 1848) was a mining engineer and United States deputy mineral surveyor for California who resided in Bodie, Mono County. There were several mining claims on Mt. Scowden in the 1800s which gave rise to the gold rush camp of Lundy.

== Mining ==
Gold and silver mining claims on Mt. Scowden:

- May Lundy
- Homer
- Harrison
- Last Chance
- Lucky Mortan
- Bay Queen
- Bryant
- Gray Eagle
- Gorilla
- Parrott
- Tamarack
- Wolverine
- Mono
- Ontario Syndicate

== Climate ==
Mount Scowden is located in an alpine climate zone. Most weather fronts originate in the Pacific Ocean, and travel east toward the Sierra Nevada mountains. As fronts approach, they are forced upward by the peaks (orographic lift), causing moisture in the form of rain or snowfall to drop onto the range.

== See also ==
- Lundy, California

== Gallery ==
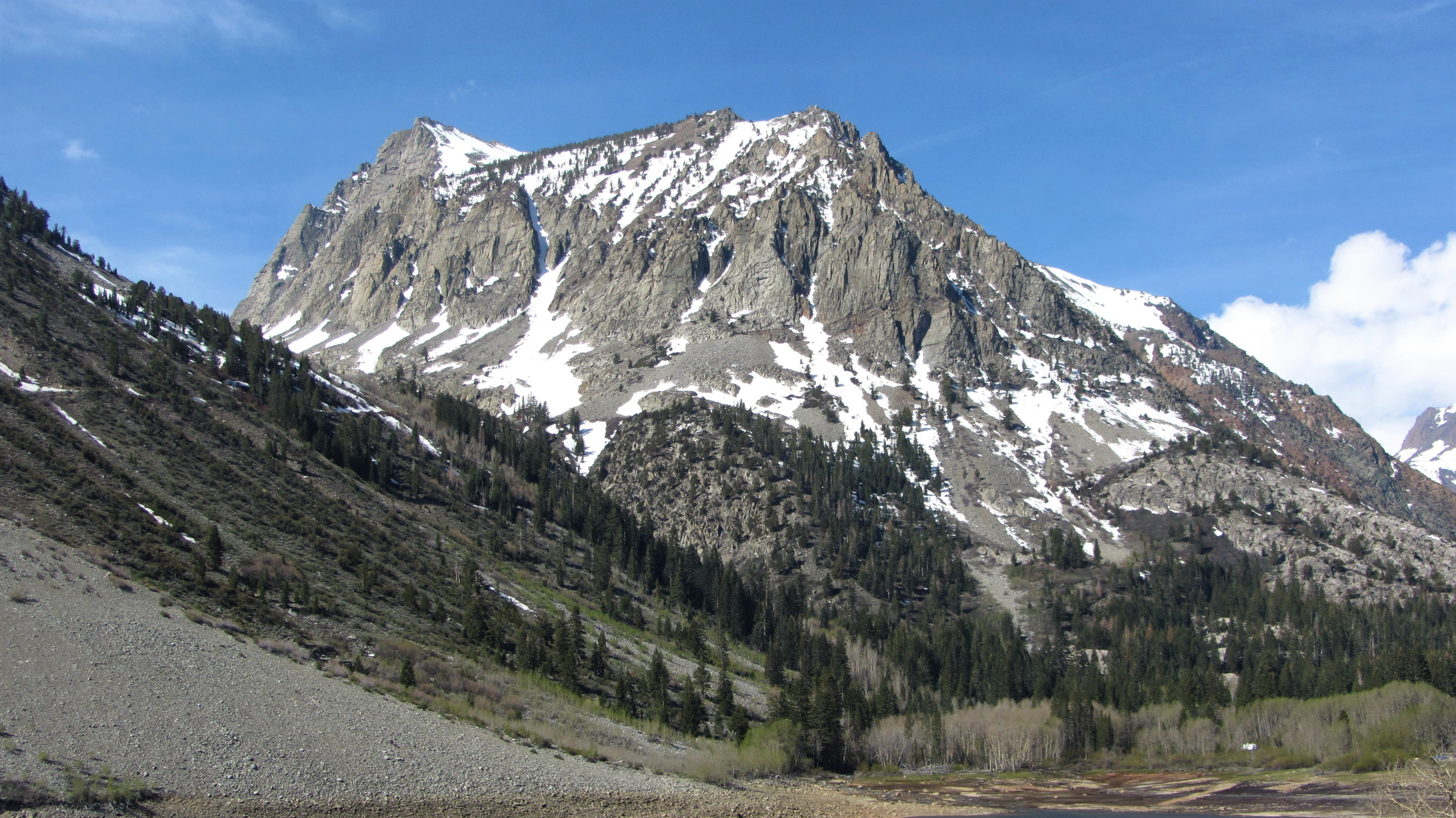
Northeast aspect of Mt. Scowden

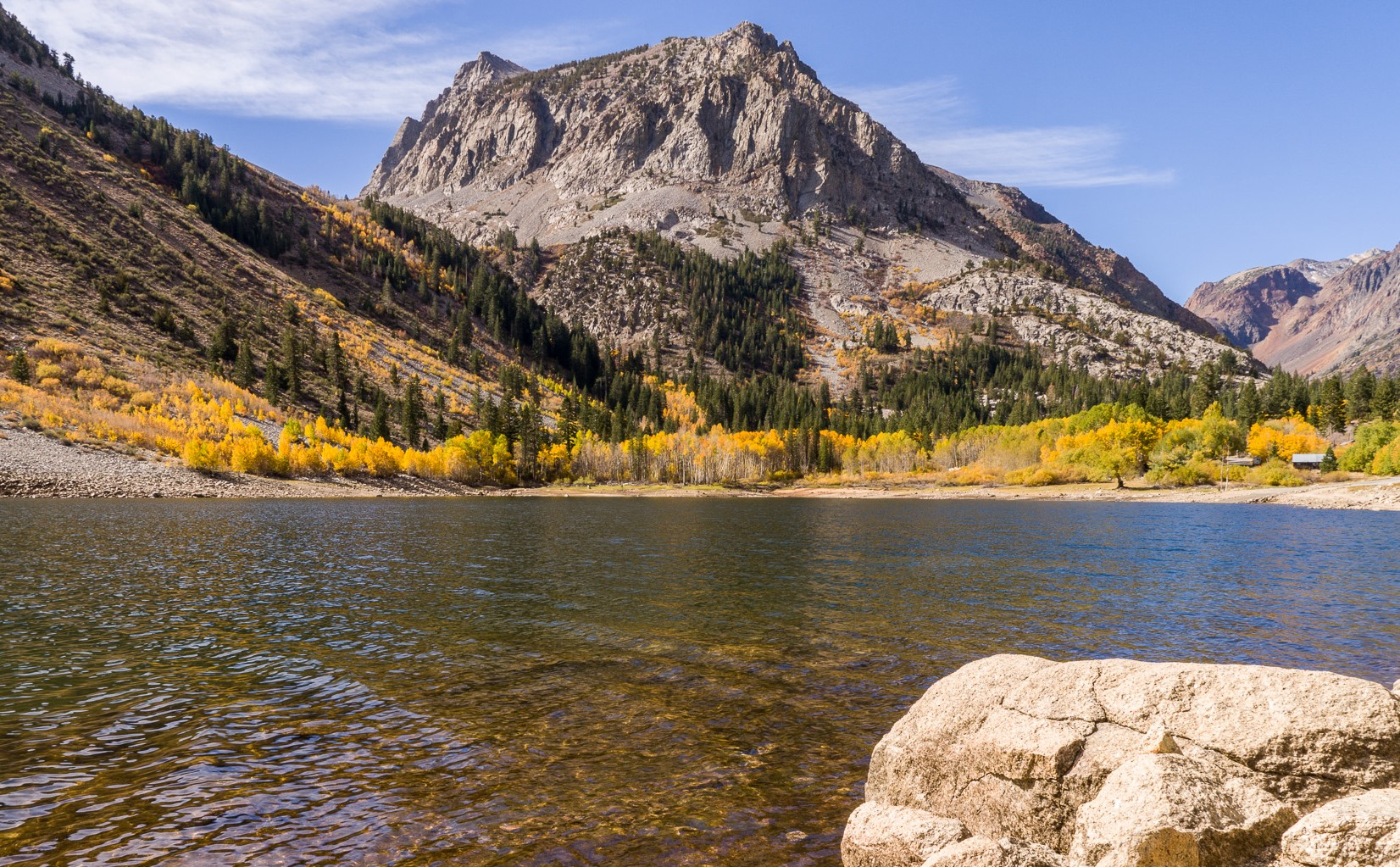
Northeast aspect of Mt. Scowden seen from Lundy Lake

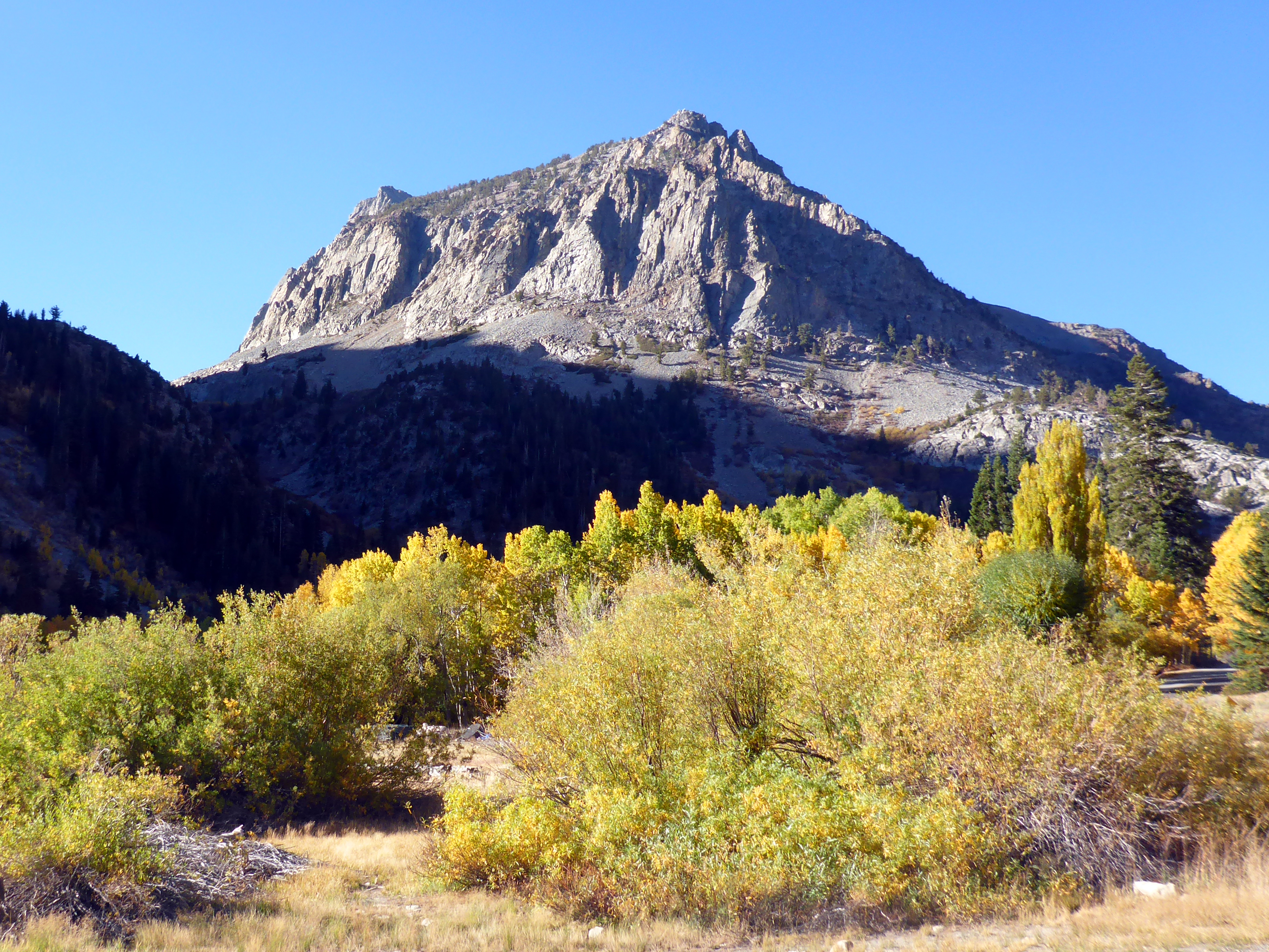

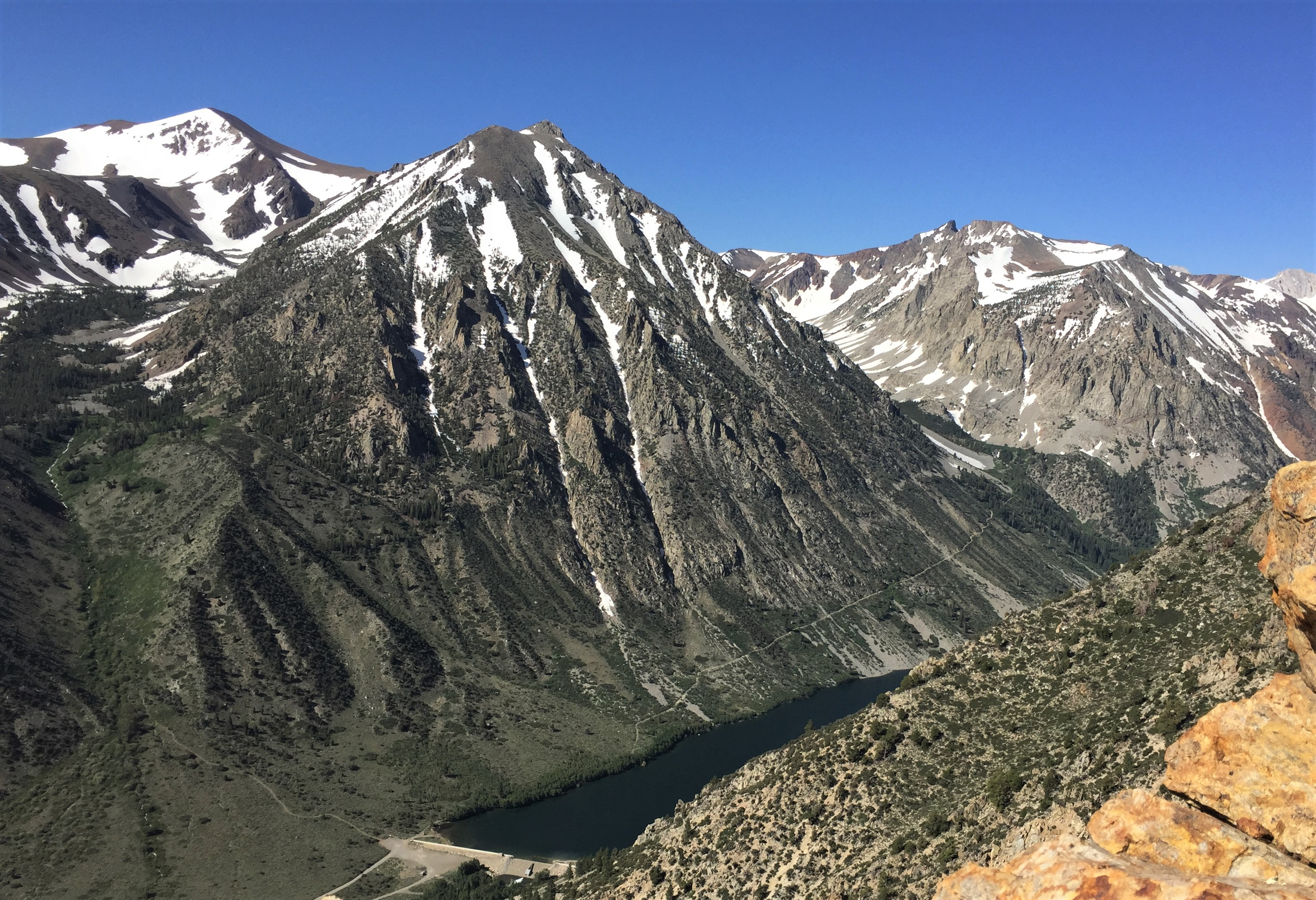
Mount Warren in upper left corner. Gilcrest Peak centered. Mount Scowden and Tioga Crest to the right. Lundy Lake below.
