= Gilcrest Peak =

Mountain of Mono County, California

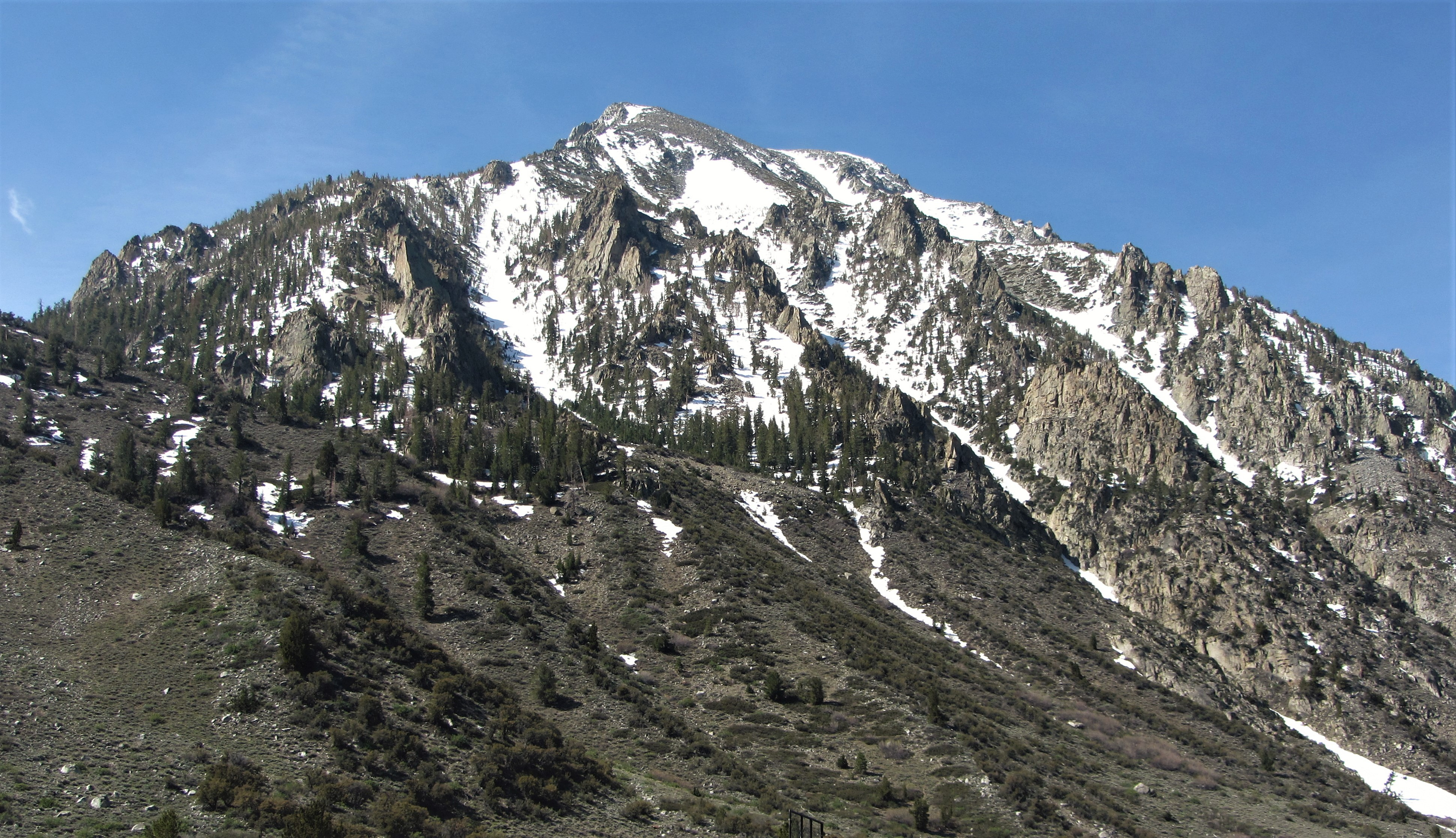
- North aspect

Highest point
- Elevation: 11,575 ft (3,528 m)
- Prominence: 415 ft (126 m)
- Parent peak: Mount Warren (12,327 ft)
- Isolation: 1.52 mi (2.45 km)
- Coordinates: 38°00′40″N 119°13′49″W

Geography
- Location within California Location within the United States
- Location: Mono County, California, U.S.
- Parent range: Sierra Nevada
- Topo map: USGS Lundy

Gilcrest Peak is an 11,575-foot-elevation (3,528-meter) summit located in the Sierra Nevada mountain range, in Mono County of northern California, United States. The mountain is set within the Hoover Wilderness, on land managed by Inyo National Forest. Gilcrest Peak is situated 1.5 miles (2.4 km) north of line parent Mount Warren, 1.6 miles (2.6 km) east of Mount Scowden, and 3.2 miles (5.1 km) southeast of Black Mountain. Topographic relief is significant as the summit rises nearly 3,800 feet (1,200 meters) above Lundy Lake in one mile. Precipitation runoff from this mountain drains to Lundy Lake, Mill Creek, and ultimately Mono Lake. The mountain's toponym has been officially adopted by the United States Board on Geographic Names.

== Climate ==
Gilcrest Peak is located in an alpine climate zone. Most weather fronts originate in the Pacific Ocean, and travel east toward the Sierra Nevada mountains. As fronts approach, they are forced upward by the peaks (orographic lift), causing moisture in the form of rain or snowfall to drop onto the range.

== See also ==
- Lundy, California

== Gallery ==
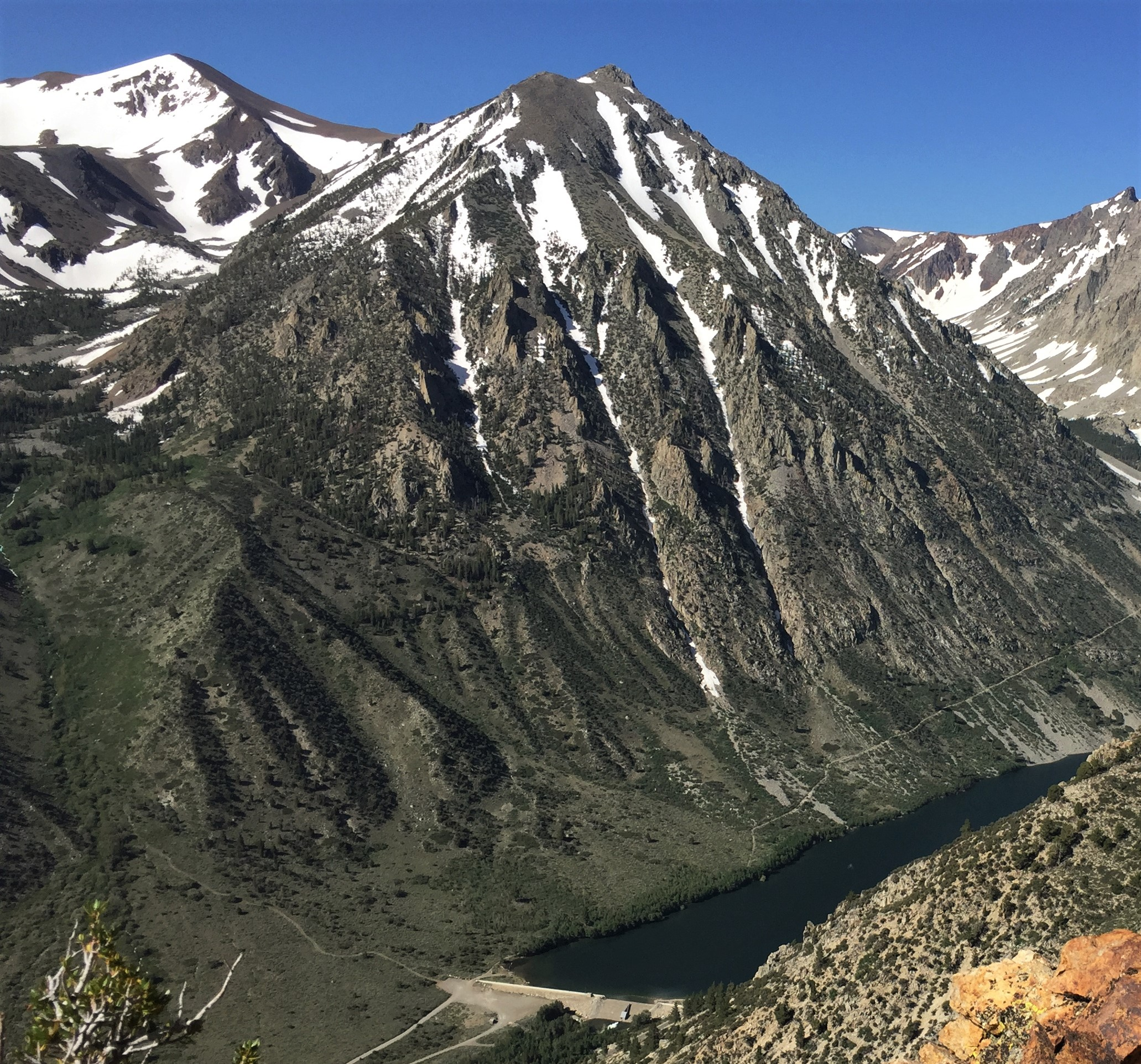
Gilcrest Peak and Lundy Lake. Mt. Warren in upper left corner.

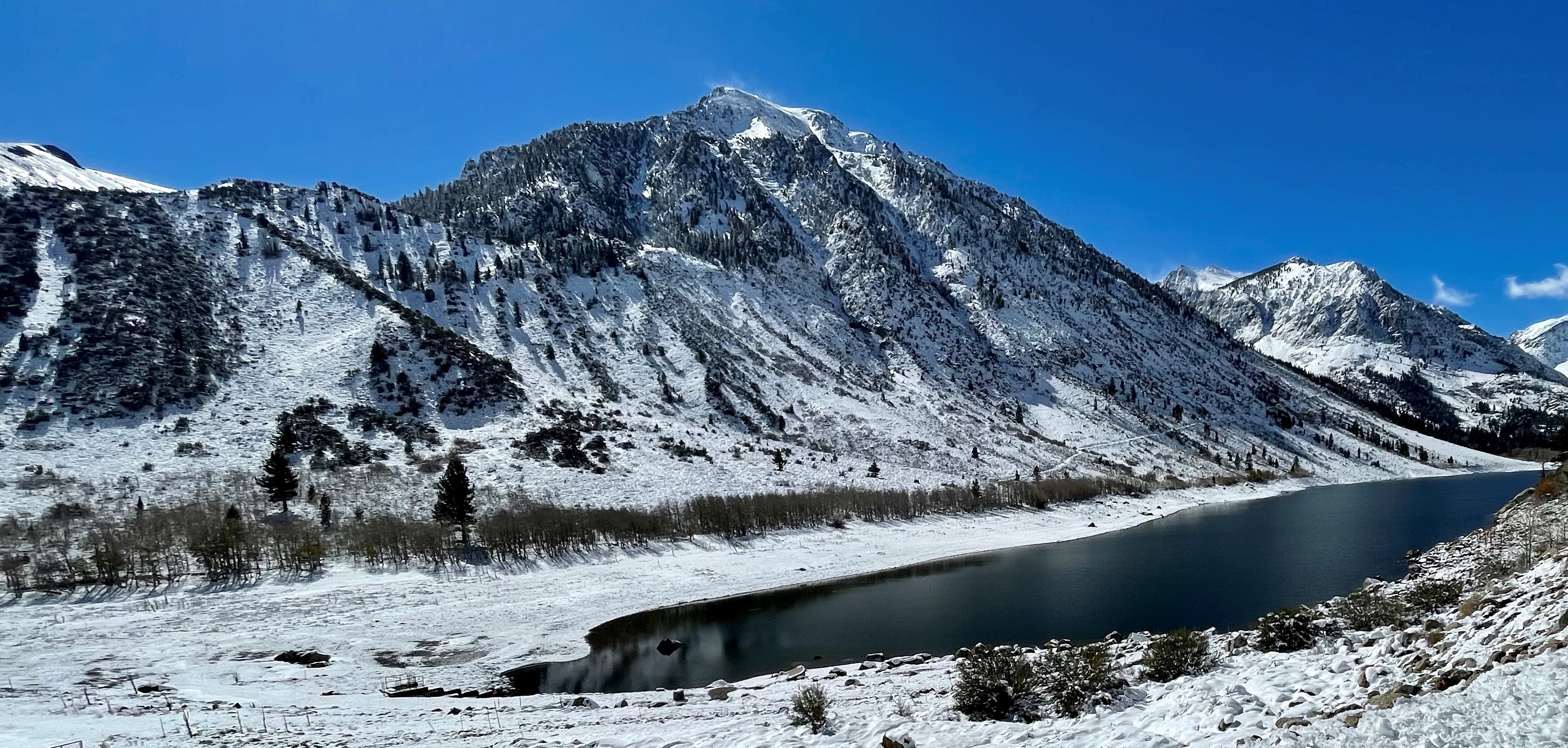
Gilcrest Peak and Lundy Lake seen from north-northeast.

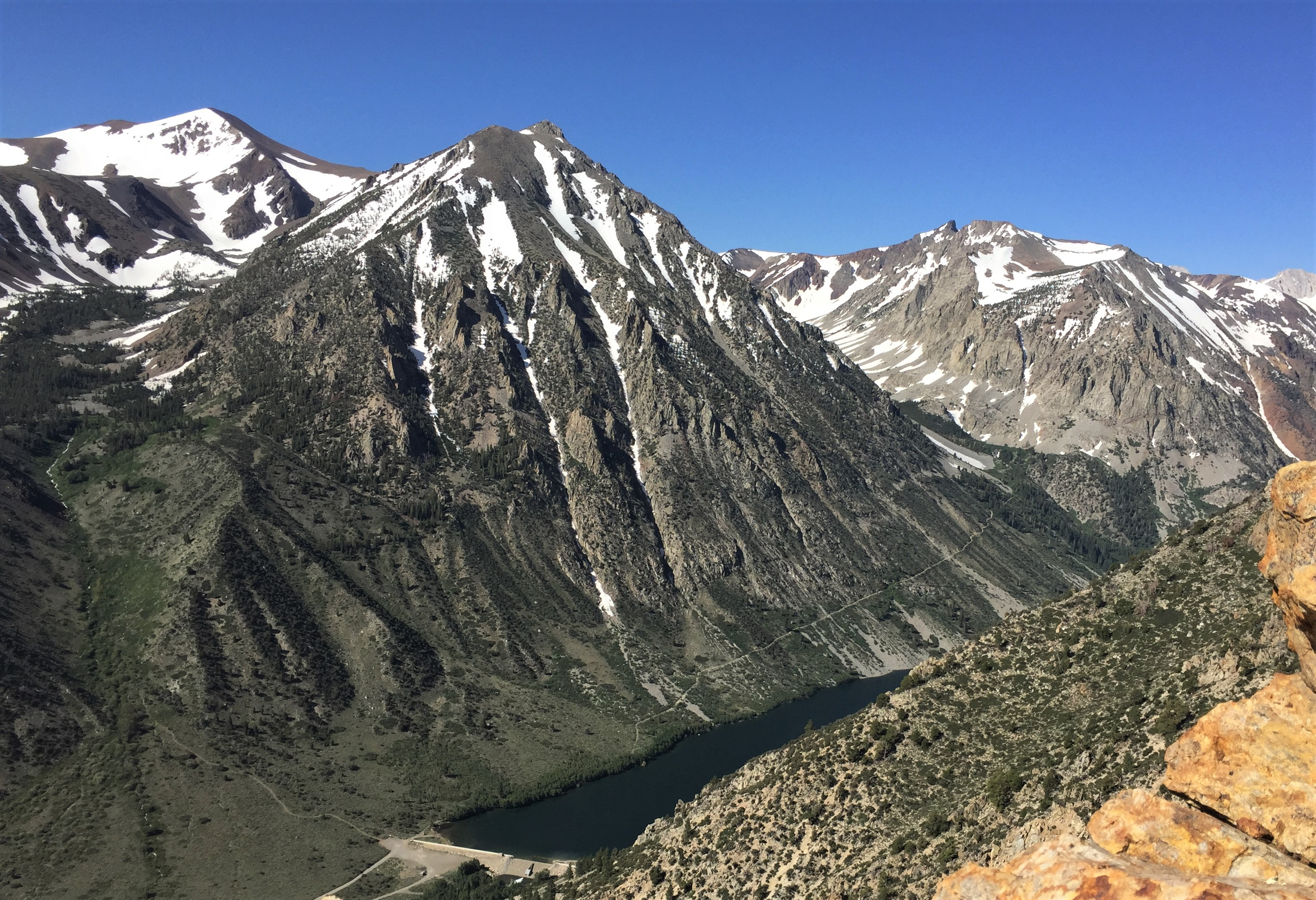
The north face of Gilcrest Peak rises above Lundy Lake as seen from Copper Mountain. Mt, Warren in upper left corner. Mt. Scowden and Tioga Crest to right.

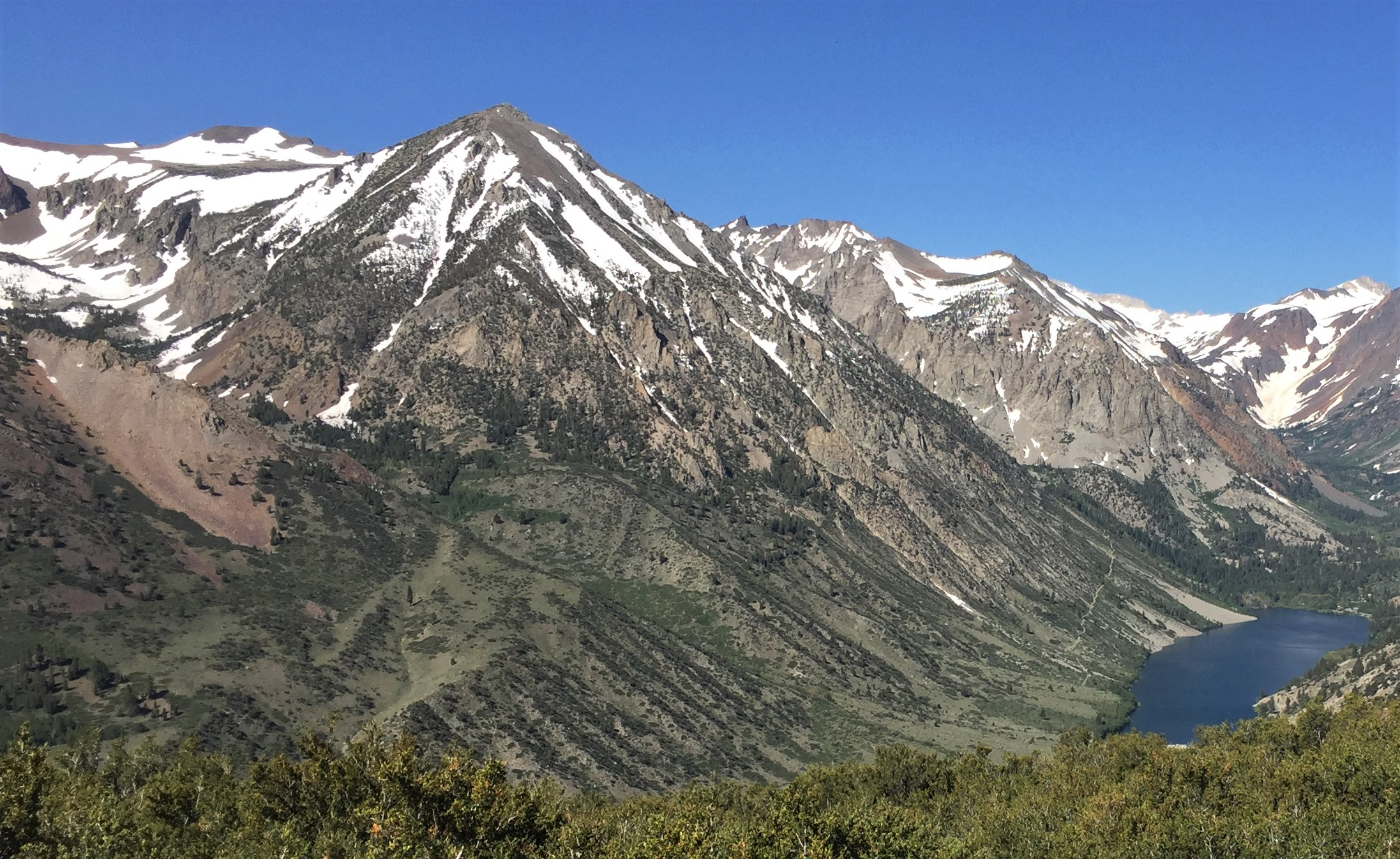
East aspect of Gilcrest Peak and Lundy Lake from Copper Mountain.

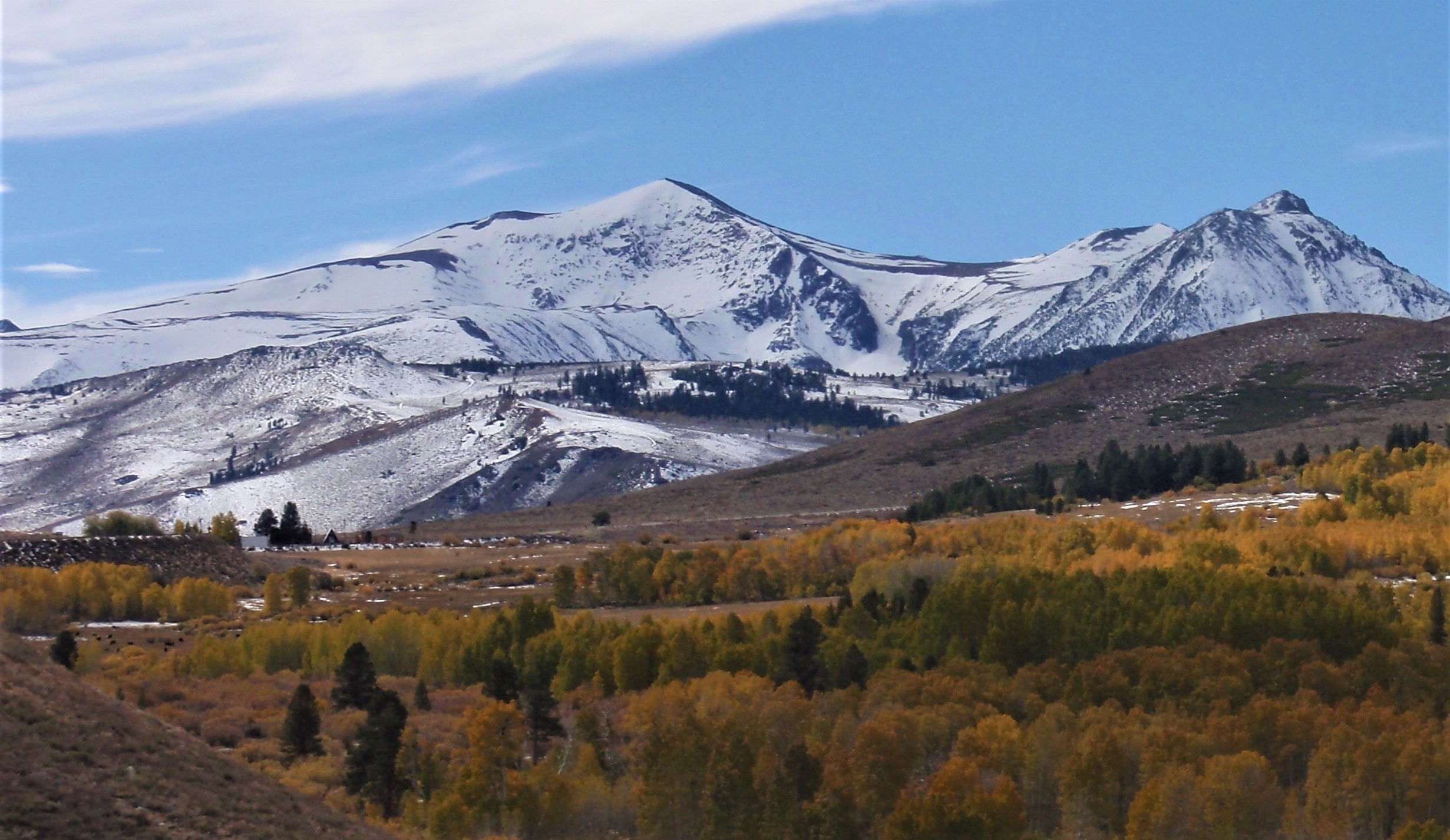
North aspect of Mt. Warren (center), Gilcrest Peak (right), from Conway Summit

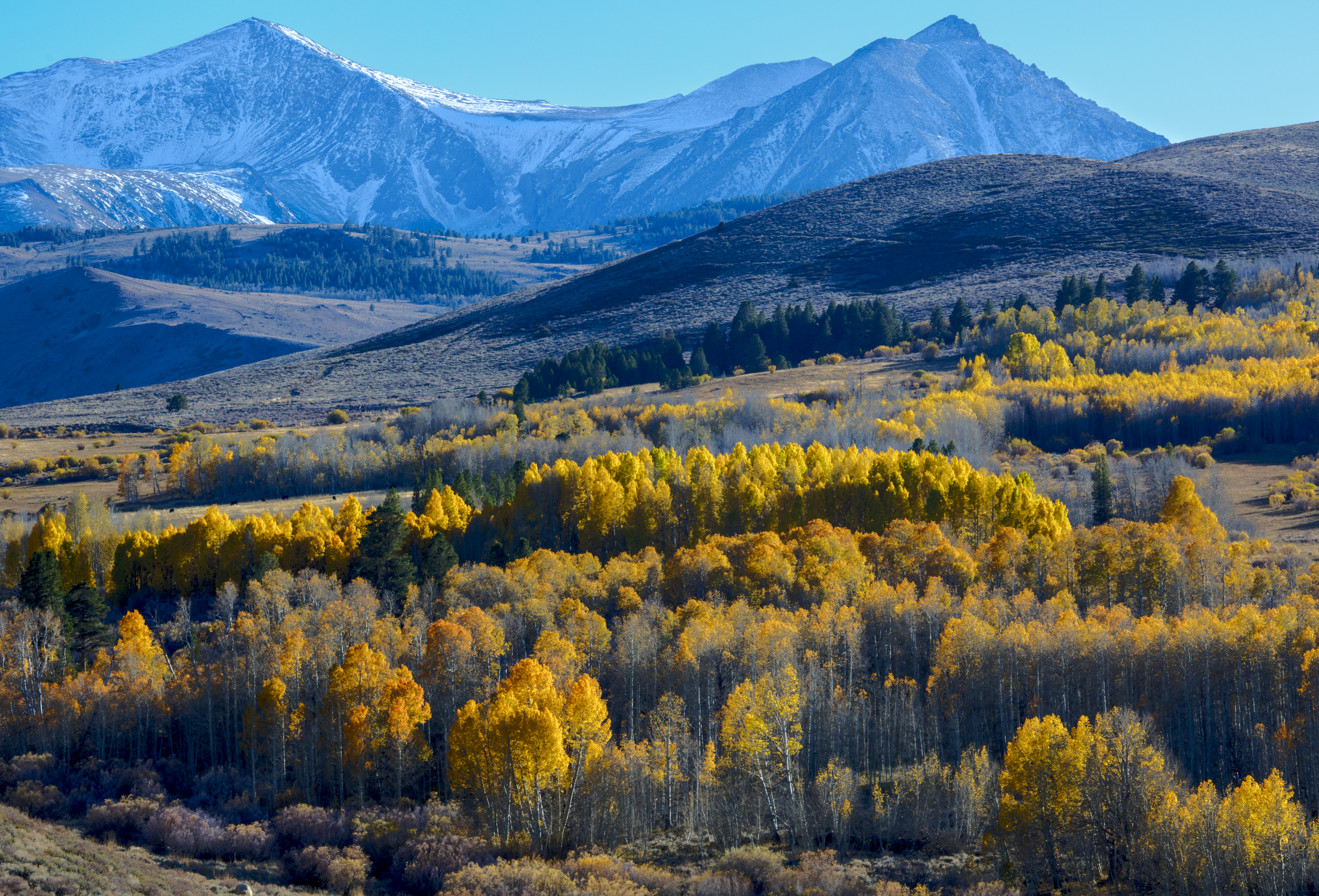
Mt. Warren (left), Gilcrest Peak (right), from Conway Summit

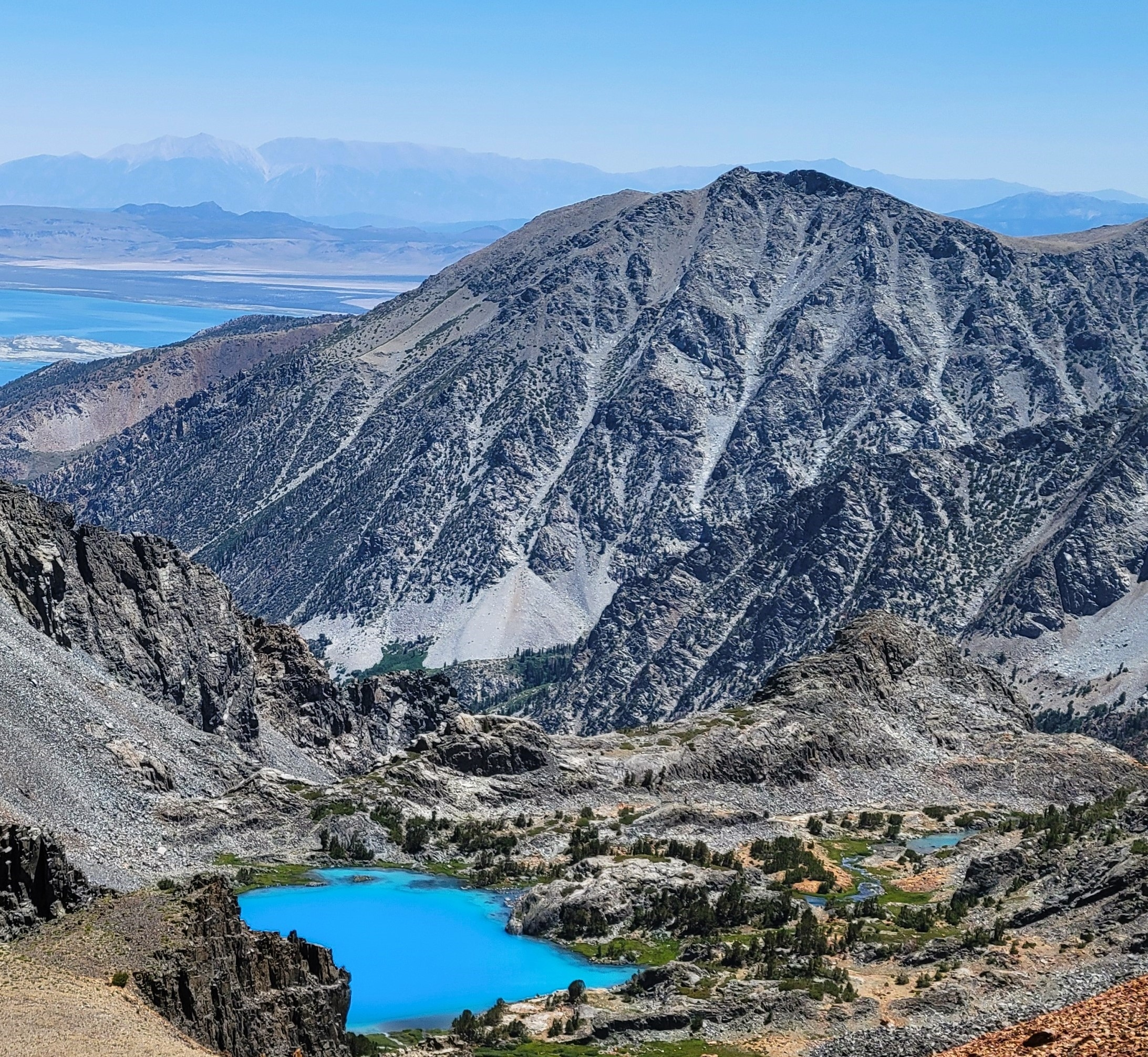
Northwest aspect of Gilcrest Peak and Burro Lake
