= Mount Warren (California) =

Mountain of Mono County, California

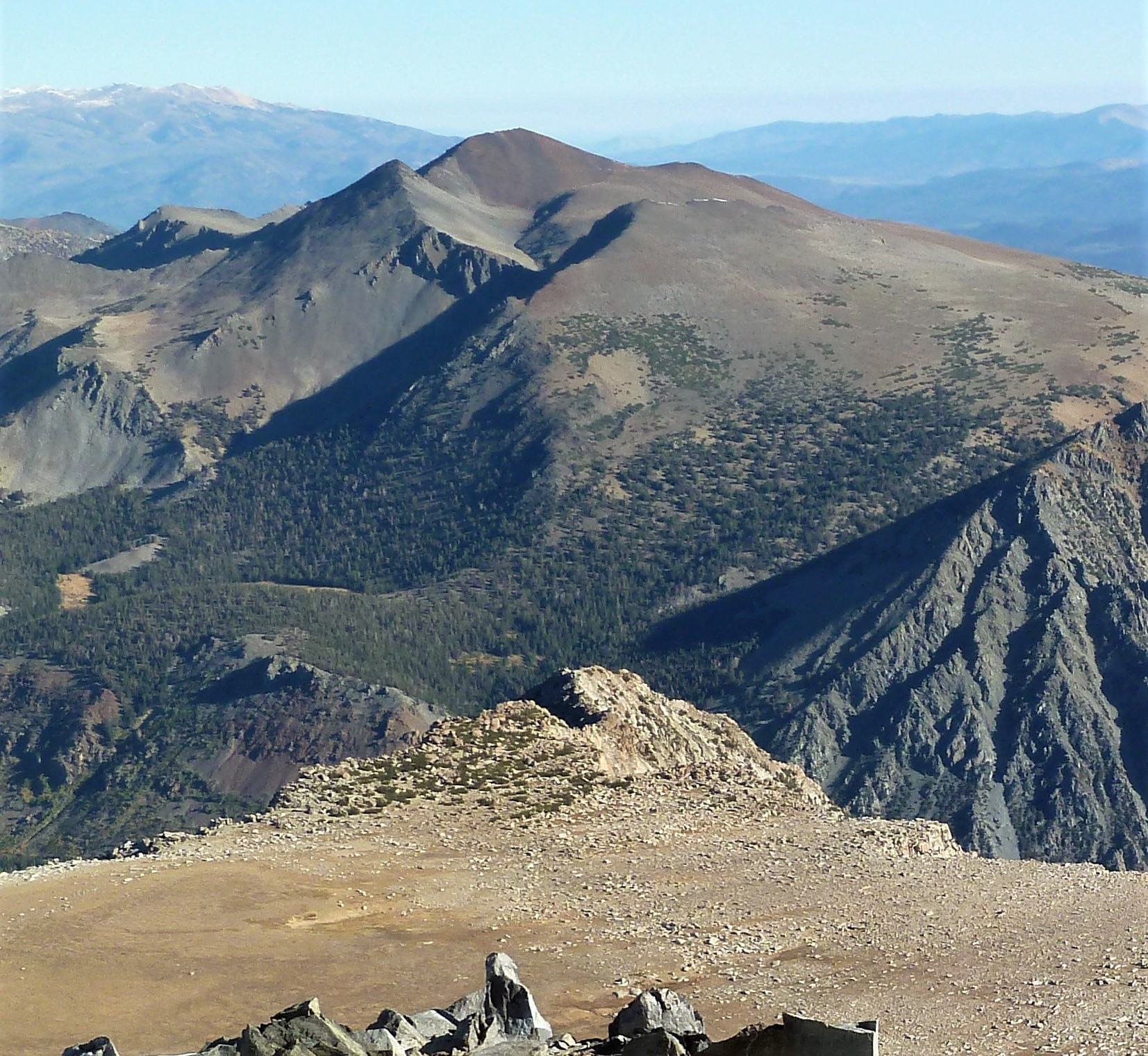
- South aspect, seen from Mt. Dana

Highest point
- Elevation: 12,327 ft (3,757 m)
- Prominence: 2,007 ft (612 m)
- Parent peak: Mount Conness (12,590 ft)
- Isolation: 5.07 mi (8.16 km)
- Listing: Sierra Peaks Section; Highest major summits of the US
- Coordinates: 37°59′24″N 119°13′24″W

Naming
- Etymology: Gouverneur K. Warren

Geography
- Location within California Location within the United States
- Location: Mono County, California, U.S.
- Parent range: Sierra Nevada
- Topo map: USGS Mount Dana

Climbing
- First ascent: <1868 by Vitus Wackenreuder
- Easiest route: class 2 North and SW slopes

Mount Warren is a 12,327-foot-elevation (3,757-meter) summit located in the Sierra Nevada mountain range, in Mono County, California, United States. The mountain is set within the Hoover Wilderness, on land managed by Inyo National Forest. The peak is situated 1.5 miles (2.4 km) south of Gilcrest Peak, 1.8 miles (2.9 km) northwest of Lee Vining Peak, and 5 miles (8.0 km) southeast of Excelsior Mountain, which is the nearest higher neighbor. Topographic relief is significant as the summit rises 5,955 feet (1,815 meters) above Mono Lake in 4.5 miles.

== History ==
The mountain's toponym was officially adopted by the United States Board on Geographic Names to honor Gouverneur K. Warren (1830–1882), topographer and United States Army general during the American Civil War. Mt. Warren is labeled on the 1901 Bridgeport Quadrangle map.

The first ascent of the summit was made by Vitus Wackenreuder, a cartographer with the California Geological Survey, sometime during the 1860s before 1868.

== Climate ==
Mount Warren is located in an alpine climate zone. Most weather fronts originate in the Pacific Ocean, and travel east toward the Sierra Nevada mountains. As fronts approach, they are forced upward by the peaks (orographic lift), causing moisture in the form of rain or snowfall to drop onto the range. Precipitation runoff from this mountain drains to Mono Lake.

== See also ==
- List of mountain peaks of California

== Gallery ==
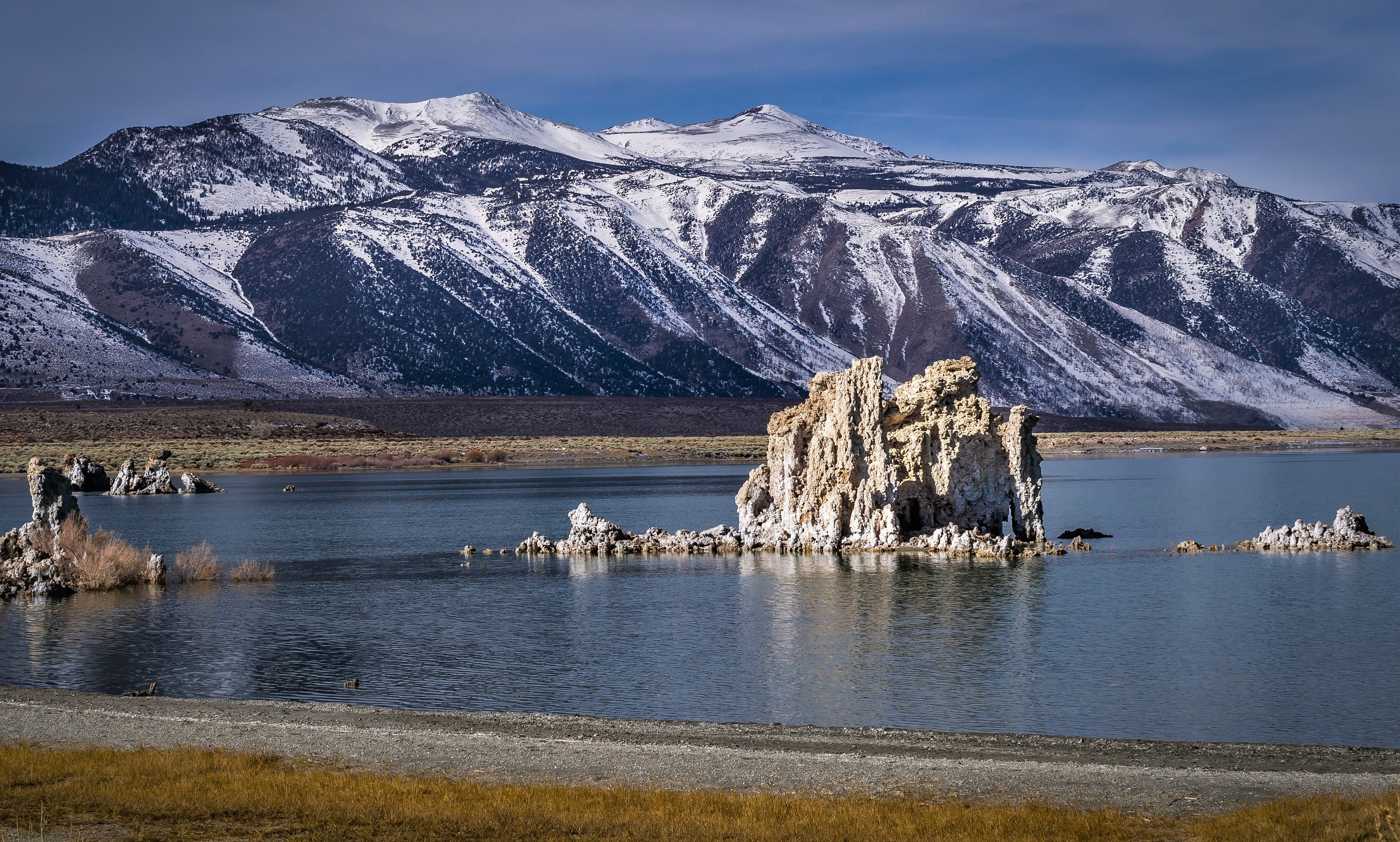
Mt. Warren (right of center), from Mono Lake.

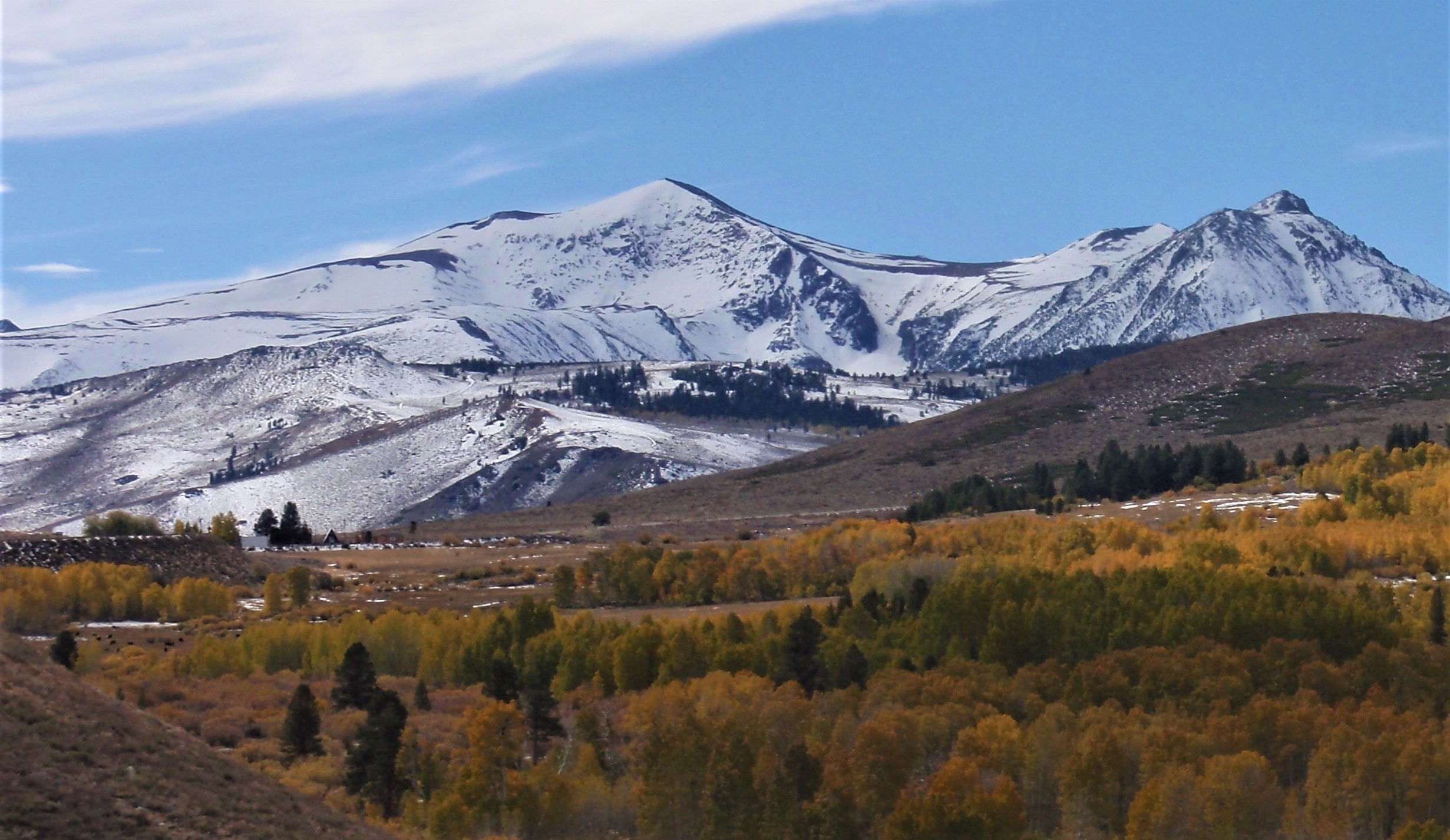
North aspect of Mt. Warren (center), Gilcrest Peak (right), from Conway Summit

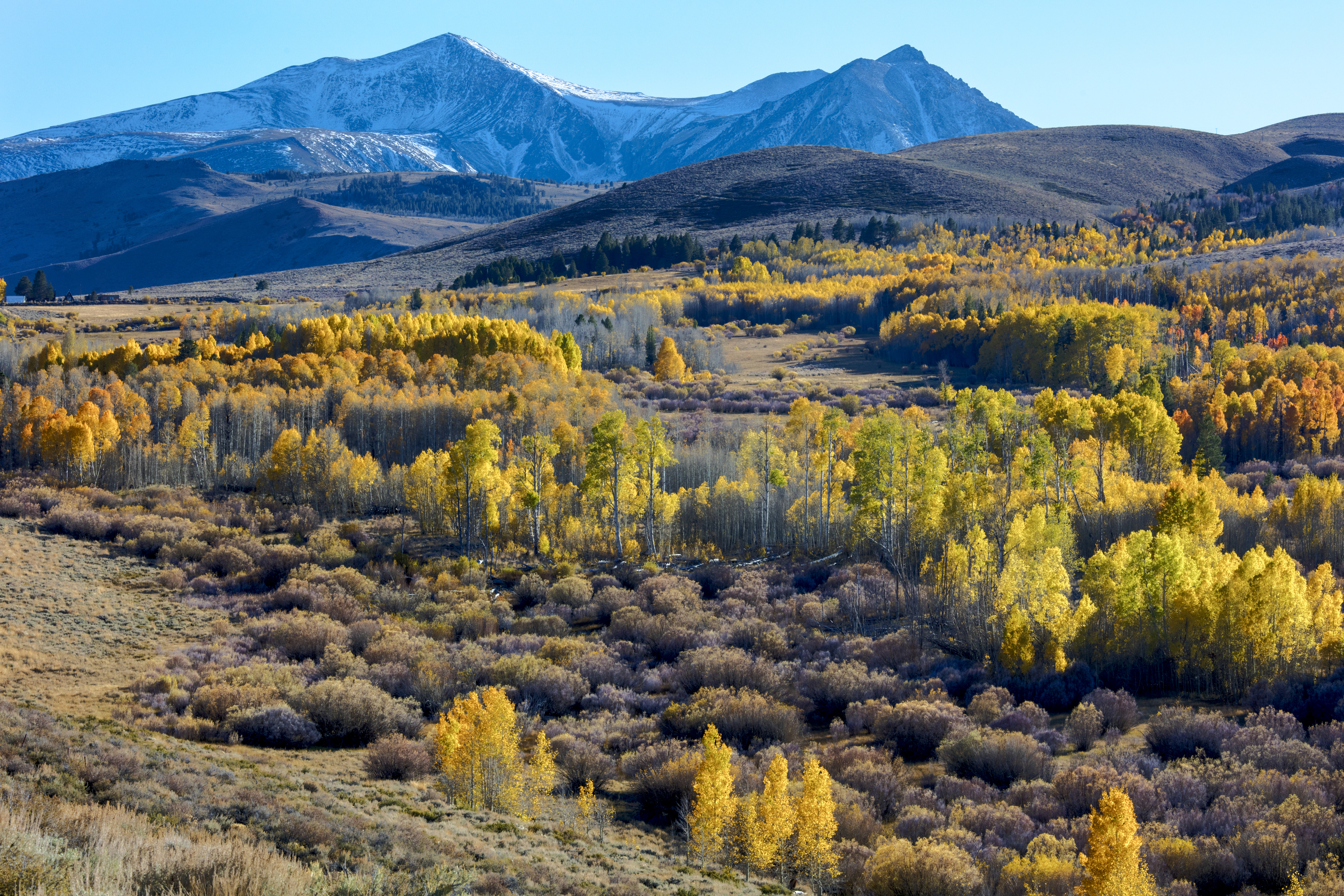
Mt. Warren (left), Gilcrest Peak (right), from Conway Summit

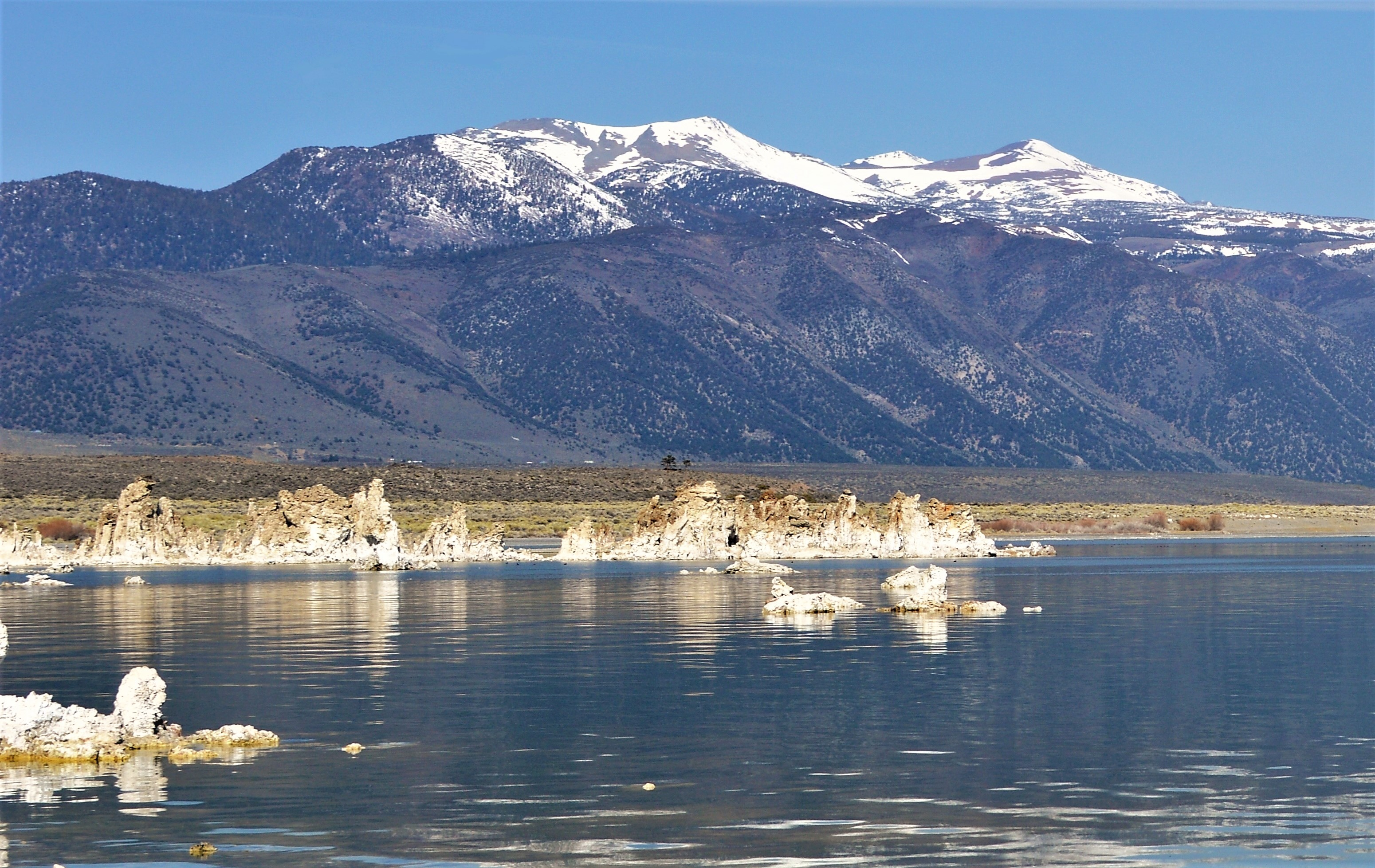
Lee Vining Peak (centered) seen from Mono Lake. Mount Warren to the right.

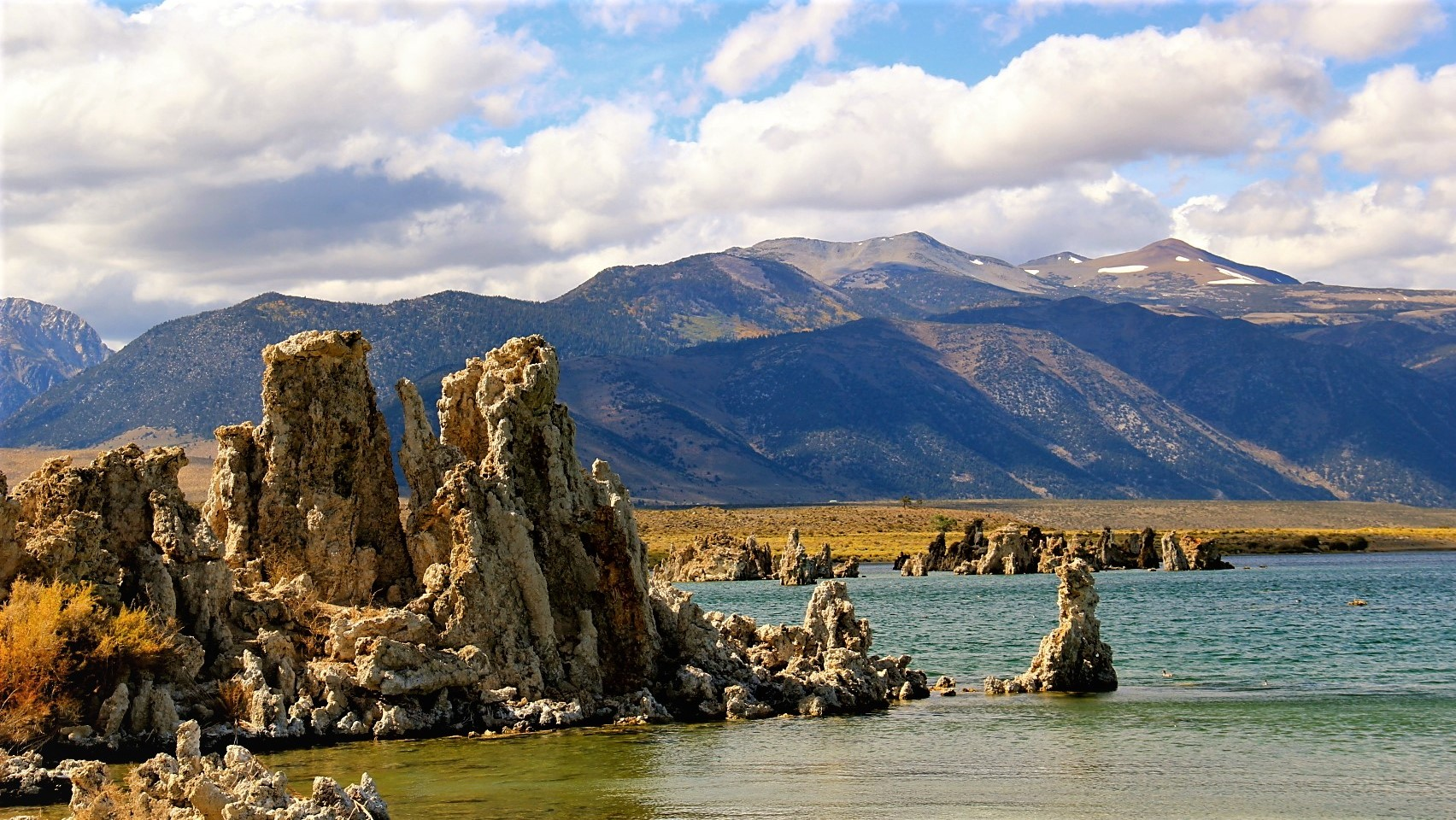
Lee Vining Peak and Mount Warren (right, with snowfields) seen from Mono Lake.

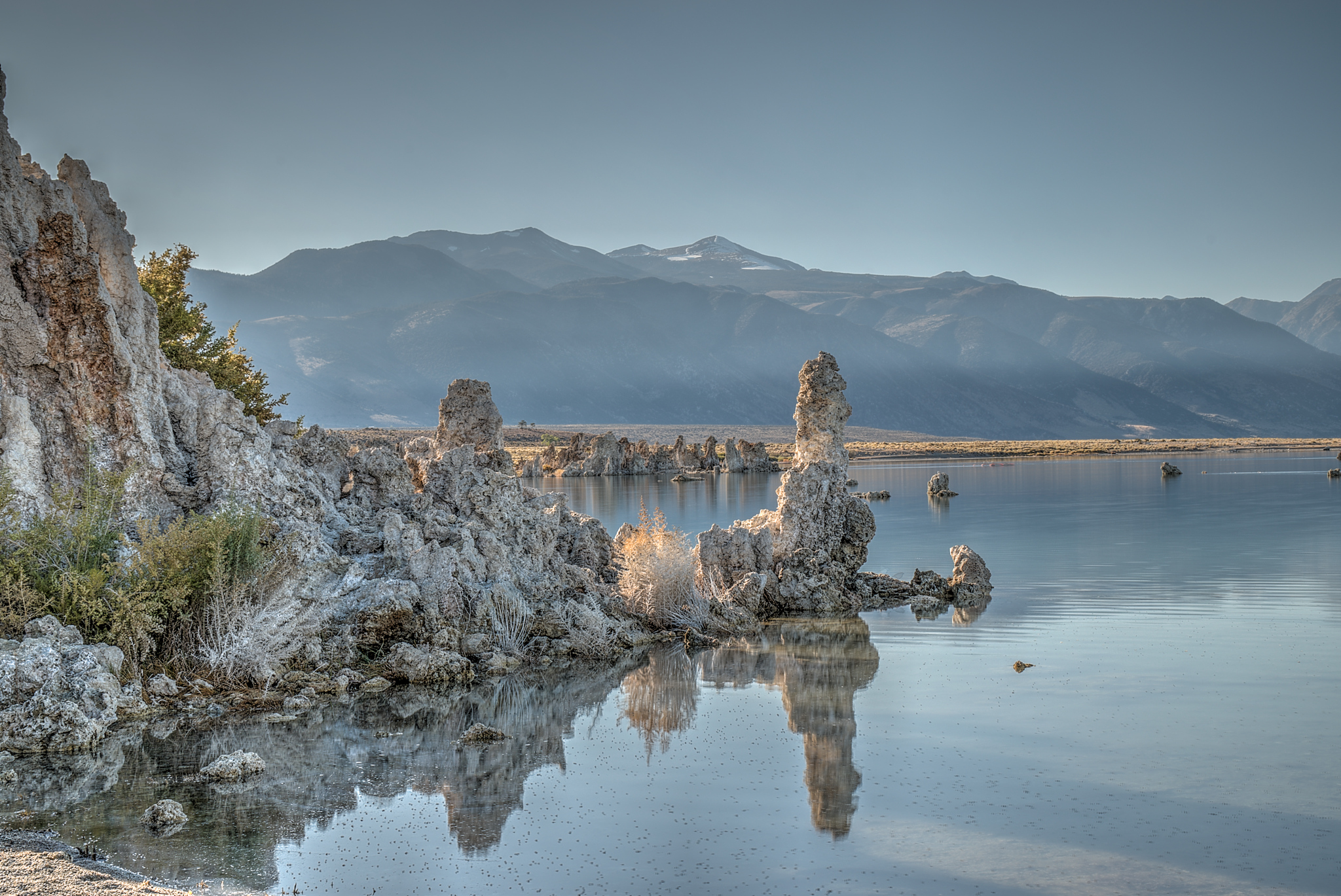
Mt. Warren centered in the distance, from Mono Lake.
