= Lee Vining Peak =

Mountain of Mono County, California

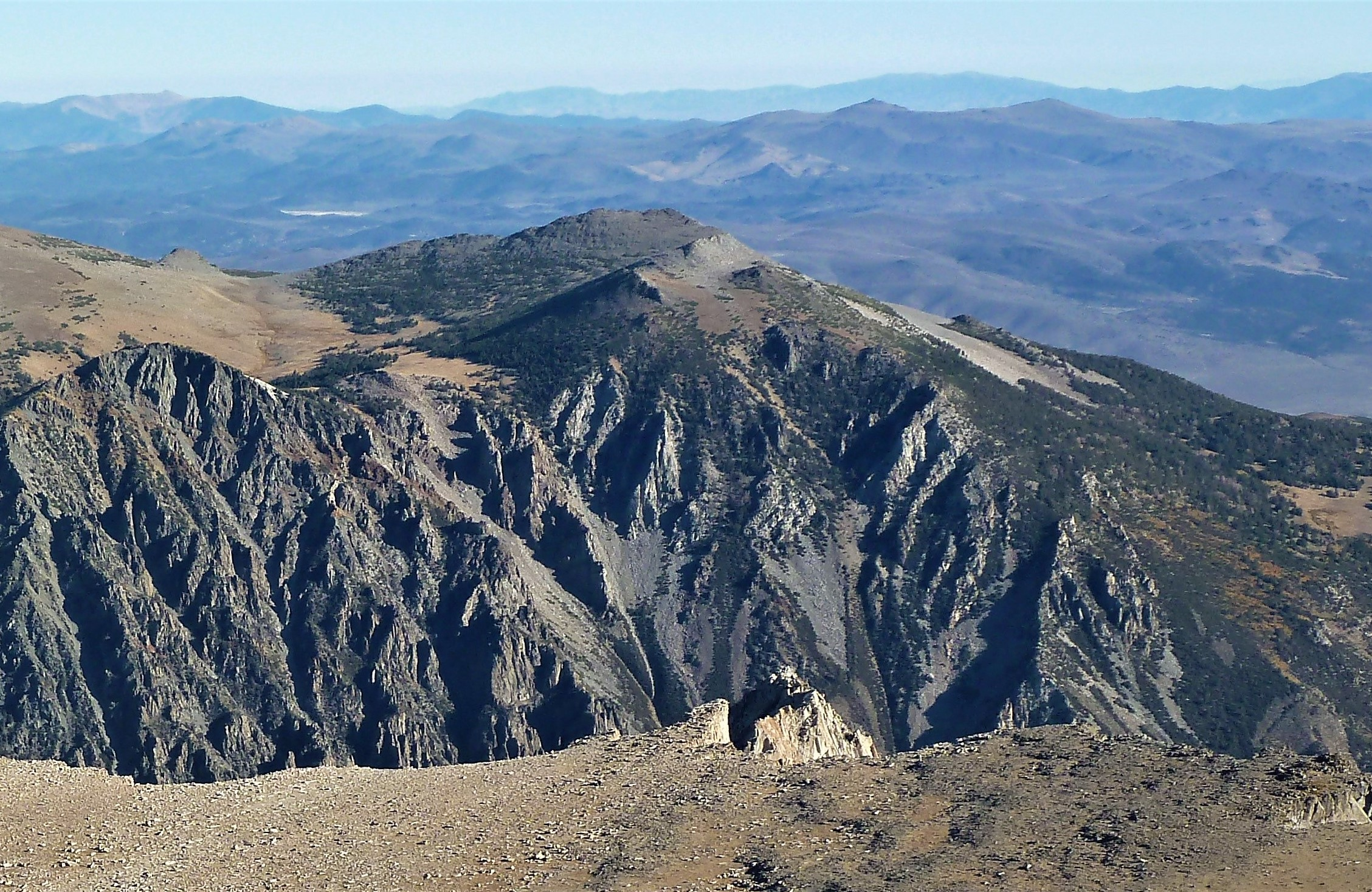
- South aspect, seen from Mt. Dana

Highest point
- Elevation: 11,690 ft (3,563 m)
- Prominence: 490 ft (149 m)
- Parent peak: Mount Warren (12,327 ft)
- Isolation: 1.80 mi (2.90 km)
- Coordinates: 37°58′21″N 119°11′55″W

Naming
- Etymology: Leroy Vining

Geography
- Location within California Location within the United States
- Location: Mono County, California, U.S.
- Parent range: Sierra Nevada
- Topo map: USGS Mount Dana

Geology
- Rock type: granodiorite

Climbing
- Easiest route: class 2 Southeast slope

Lee Vining Peak is an 11,690-foot-elevation (3,560-meter) summit located in the Sierra Nevada mountain range, in Mono County of northern California, United States. The mountain is set within the Hoover Wilderness, on land managed by Inyo National Forest. The peak is situated north of Lee Vining Canyon, and 1.8 miles (2.9 km) southeast of Mount Warren, which is the nearest higher neighbor. Topographic relief is significant as the summit rises 5,300 feet (1,600 meters) above Mono Lake in less than four miles (6.4 km), and 4,000 feet (1,200 meters) above Lee Vining Creek in two miles (3.2 km).

== History ==
The mountain's toponym was officially adopted by the United States Board on Geographic Names to honor Leroy Vining, an early pioneer who in 1852 established a small mining camp that would later become the town of Lee Vining, California, which is five miles east-southeast of the peak. His life ended in 1863 at the Exchange Saloon in Aurora, Nevada, where he accidentally shot himself in the groin with the pistol in his pocket. In 1901 the name was adopted as "Leevining Peak", and in 1955 the board changed it to "Lee Vining Peak."

== Climate ==
Lee Vining Peak is located in an alpine climate zone. Most weather fronts originate in the Pacific Ocean, and travel east toward the Sierra Nevada mountains. As fronts approach, they are forced upward by the peaks (orographic lift), causing moisture in the form of rain or snowfall to drop onto the range. Precipitation runoff from this mountain drains to Mono Lake.

== See also ==
- List of mountain peaks of California

== Gallery ==
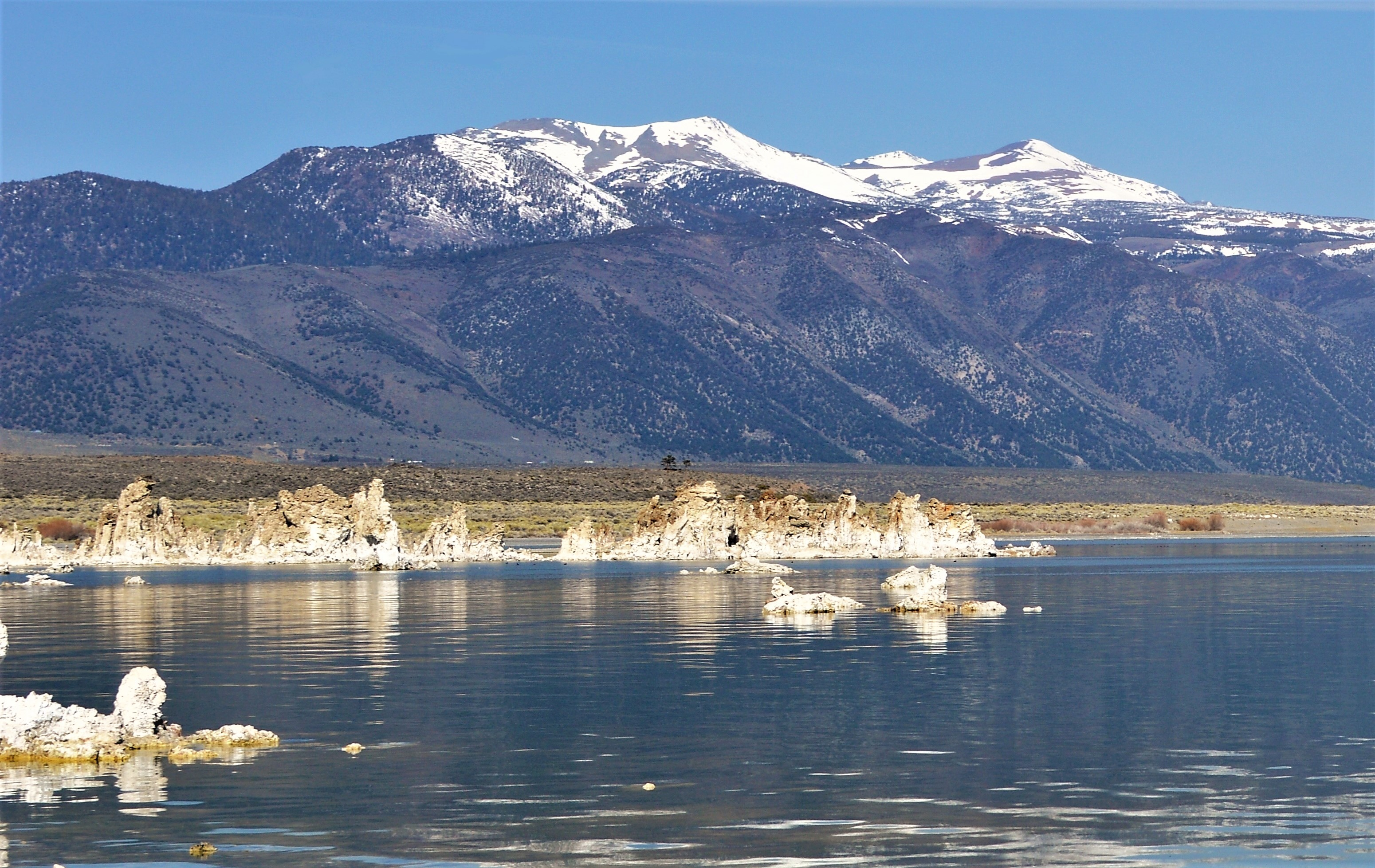
Lee Vining Peak (centered) seen from Mono Lake. Mount Warren to right.

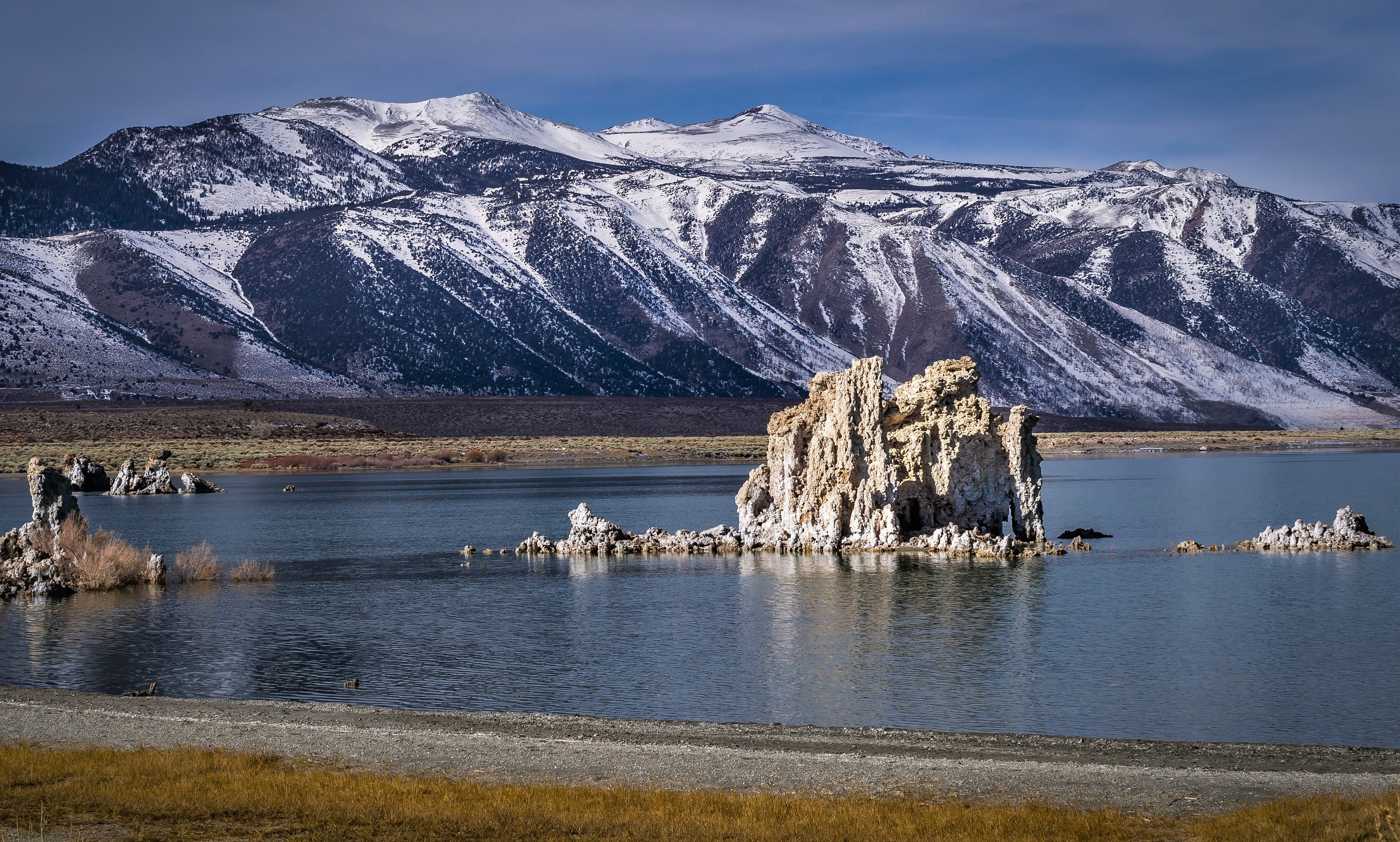
Lee Vining Peak (left) and Mount Warren (center) seen from Mono Lake.

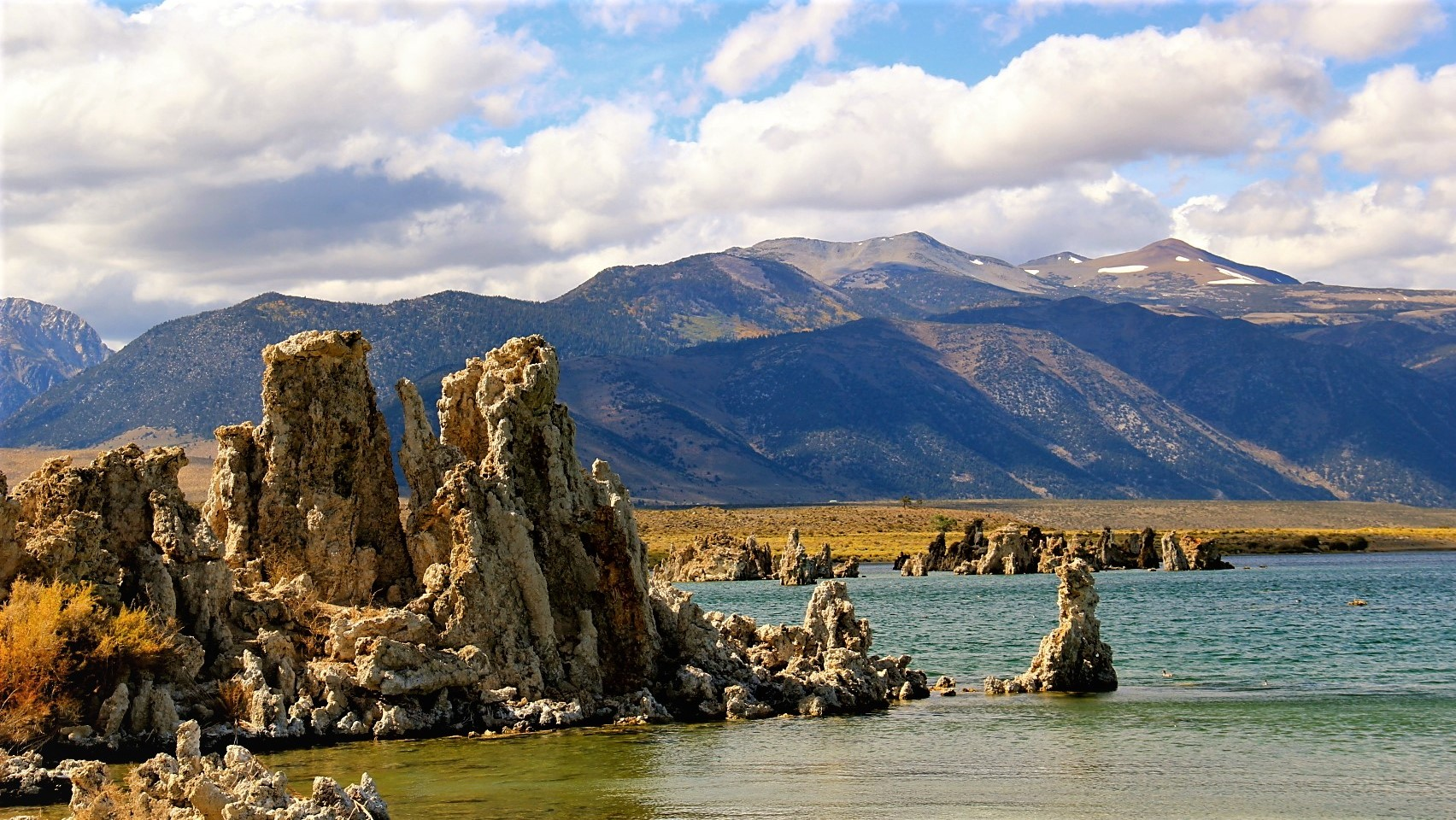
Lee Vining Peak and Mount Warren seen from Mono Lake.
