= Tioga Crest =

Mountain in California, United States

Coordinates: 37°59′35″N 119°15′56″W

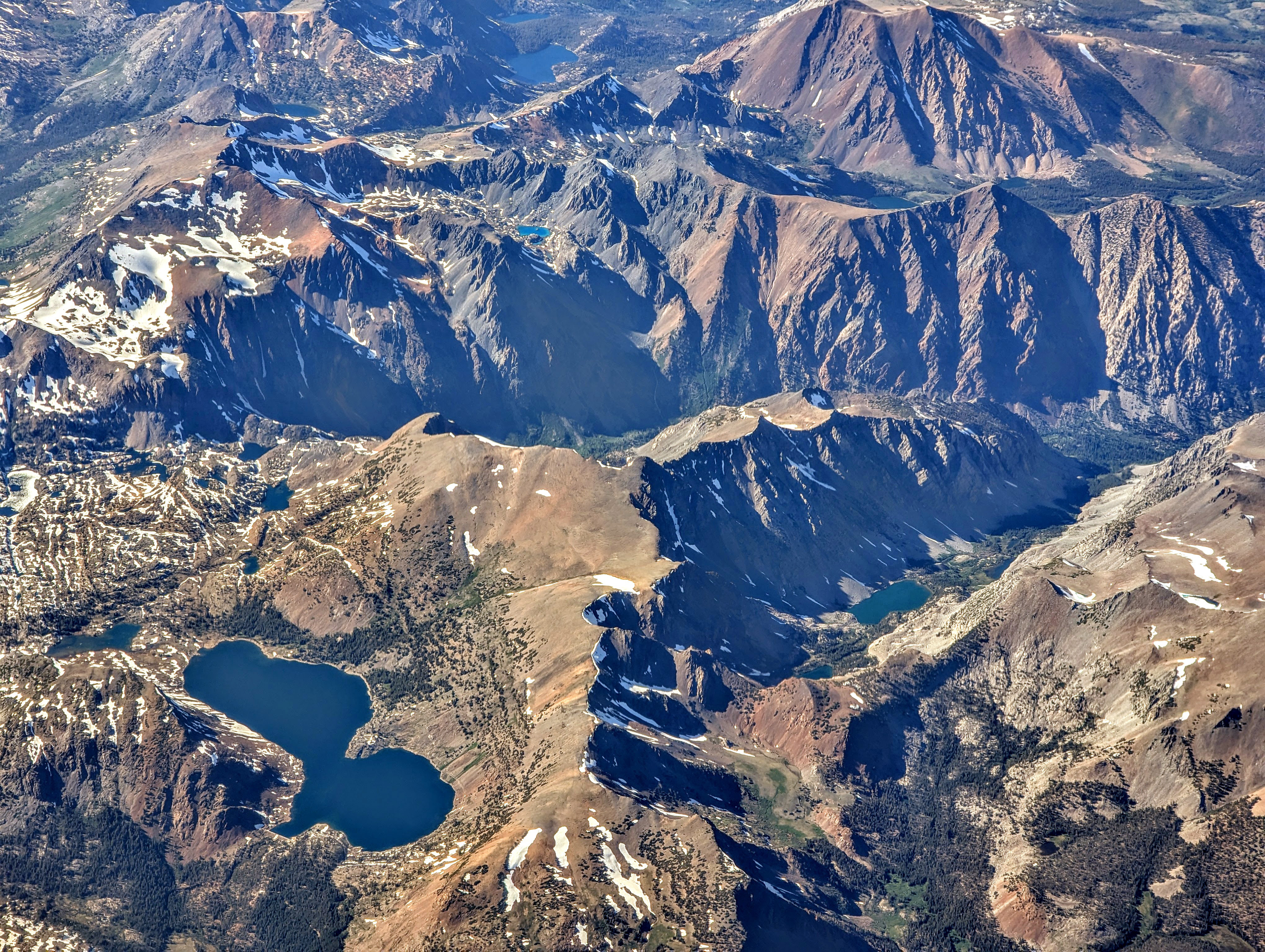
Aerial view of Tioga Crest (center to lower center) with Saddlebag Lake (left) and Oneida Lake (right) and Lundy Canyon (behind the crest)

Tioga Crest is an 11,880-foot-elevation (3,620-meter) mountain ridge and peak in the Sierra Nevada mountain range in Mono County, California.

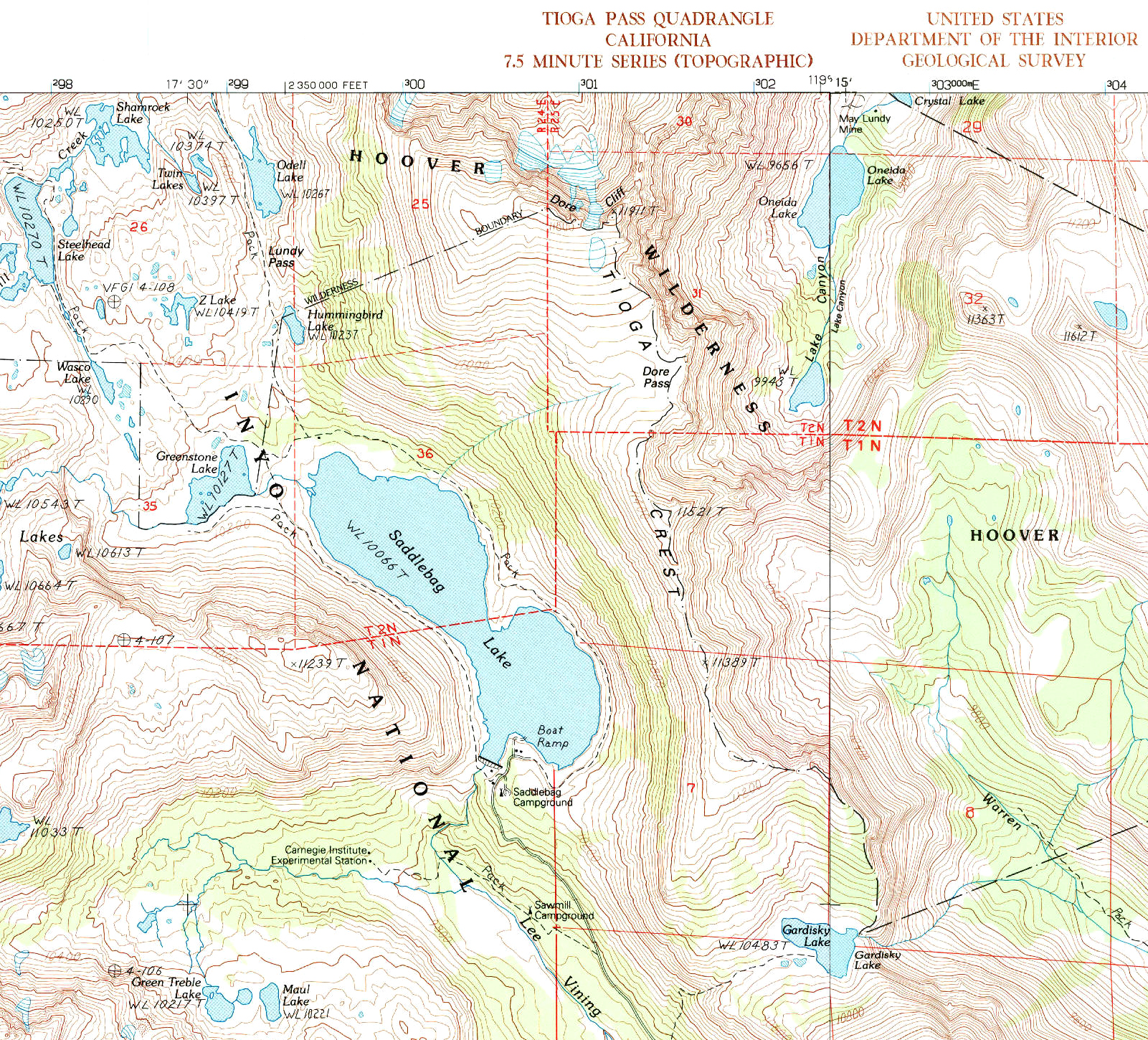
Topo map showing Tioga Crest running north–south (center)
