= Lundy, California =

Unincorporated community in California, United States

Lundy
- Location in California Lundy (the United States)
- Coordinates: 38°01′39″N 119°14′30″W
- Country: United States
- State: California
- County: Mono
- Elevation: 7,858 ft (2,395 m)

Lundy (formerly Mill Creek) is a defunct community in Mono County, California, United States, located on Mill Creek in Lundy Canyon near the western end of Lundy Lake. It is situated at an elevation of 7858 feet (2395 m). It was named after O.J. Lundy, who operated a sawmill near Lundy Lake. The sawmill was a major timber producer for the nearby town of Bodie. Lundy also had a mining camp that was established in 1879. The Lundy post office ran from 1880 to 1914.

Like many gold rush camps, Lundy is now defunct. The building of a dam raised Lundy Lake, and part of the site where the community once stood is now submerged.

Lundy is now a popular fishing resort. Electricity is provided via a small generator and facilities are rather primitive. Besides the main lake there are also three lakes accessible only by hiking and several beaver ponds.

When driving into Lundy Canyon, one can see the last grave of what was once a large cemetery. One section of Lundy Lake is called Stagecoach Corner, as a stagecoach missed the sharp turn and ended up plummeting into the lake. Many years ago, scuba divers confirmed this story by finding the stagecoach, preserved by the icy cold waters of the lake, lying on its side.
