= Mono City, California =

- Census-designated place
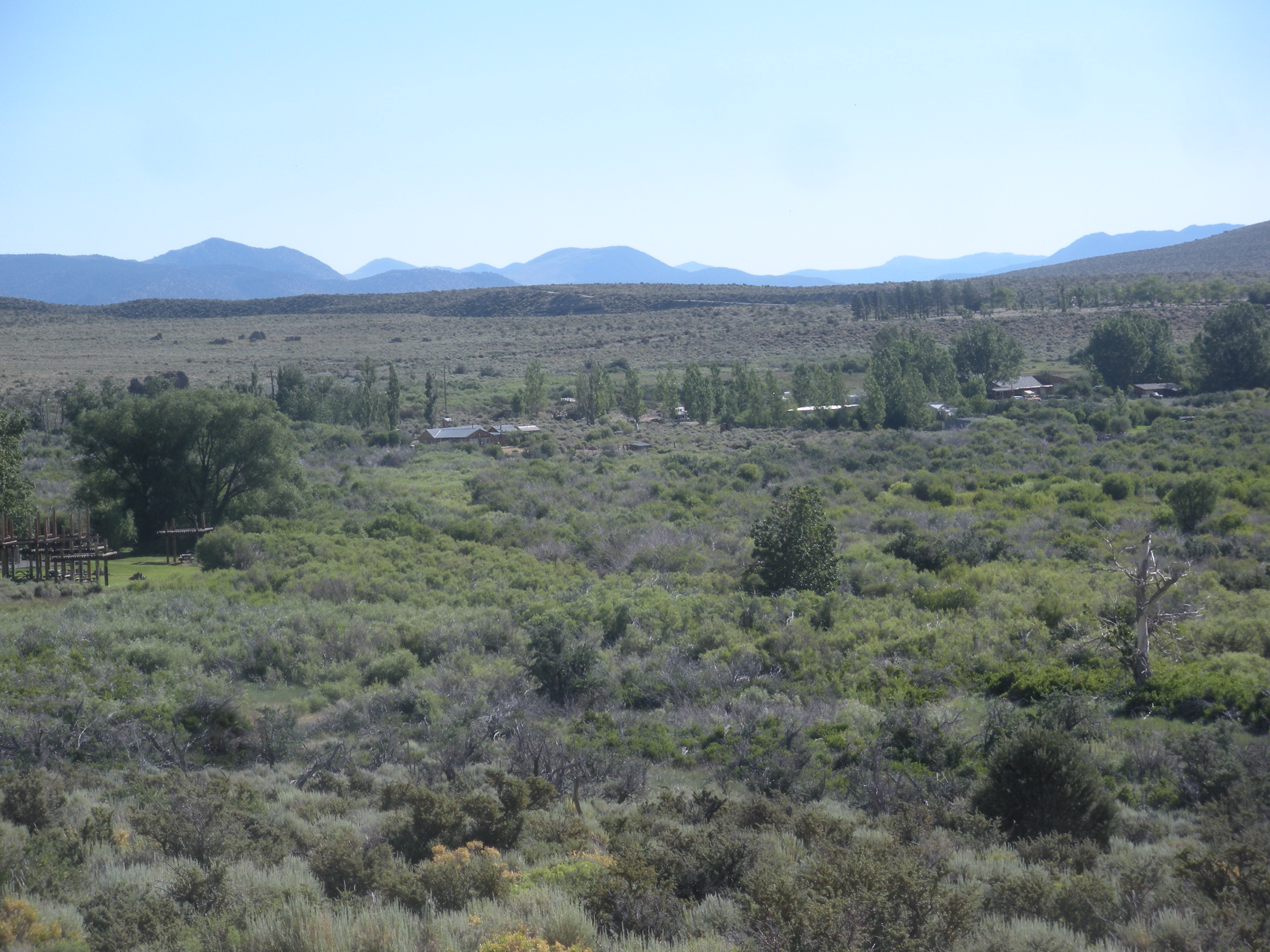
- Mono City from a distance

- Location in Mono County and the state of California

- Location within California Location within the United States
- Coordinates: 38°02′27″N 119°08′41″W
- Country: United States
- State: California
- County: Mono

Area
  - Total: 7.84 sq mi (20.30 km^{2})
  - Land: 7.84 sq mi (20.30 km^{2})
  - Water: 0 sq mi (0 km^{2}) 0%
- Elevation: 6,762 ft (2,061 m)

Population (2020)
  - Total: 224
  - Density: 28.6/sq mi (11.0/km^{2})
- Time zone: UTC-8 (Pacific (PST))
  - Summer (DST): UTC-7 (PDT)
- ZIP Code: 93541 (Lee Vining)
- Area codes: 760; 442
- GNIS feature ID: 2583083

Mono City is an unincorporated community and census-designated place (CDP) in Mono County, California, United States. It lies north of Mono Lake at the base of the Sierra Nevada at the junction of U.S. Route 395 and California State Route 167. The ZIP Code is 93541; mail to Mono City should be addressed Lee Vining. The population was 224 at the 2020 census, up from 172 at the 2010 census.

== Geography ==
Mono City is in western Mono County. US 395 leads north 19 miles (31 km) to Bridgeport, the county seat, and south 32 miles (51 km) to Mammoth Lakes. State Route 167 leads east across the Mono Valley 21 miles (34 km) to the Nevada border.

According to the United States Census Bureau, the CDP covers an area of 7.8 square miles (20 km^{2}), all land.

=== Demographics ===
Historical population
Census	Pop.	Note	%±
2010	172		—
2020	184		7.0%
U.S. Decennial Census; 2000 2010

Mono City first appeared as a census designated place in the 2010 U.S. census.

=== 2020 ===
The 2020 United States census reported that Mono City had a population of 224. The population density was 28.6 inhabitants per square mile (11.0/km^{2}). The racial makeup of Mono City was 184 (82.1%) White, 0 (0.0%) African American, 0 (0.0%) Native American, 0 (0.0%) Asian, 0 (0.0%) Pacific Islander, 25 (11.2%) from other races, and 15 (6.7%) from two or more races. Hispanic or Latino of any race were 45 persons (20.1%).

The whole population lived in households. There were 87 households, out of which 17 (19.5%) had children under the age of 18 living in them, 44 (50.6%) were married-couple households, 10 (11.5%) were cohabiting couple households, 22 (25.3%) had a female householder with no partner present, and 11 (12.6%) had a male householder with no partner present. 22 households (25.3%) were one person, and 9 (10.3%) were one person aged 65 or older. The average household size was 2.57. There were 55 families (63.2% of all households).

The age distribution was 49 people (21.9%) under the age of 18, 14 people (6.2%) aged 18 to 24, 51 people (22.8%) aged 25 to 44, 56 people (25.0%) aged 45 to 64, and 54 people (24.1%) who were 65 years of age or older. The median age was 41.8 years. For every 100 females, there were 100.0 males.

There were 116 housing units at an average density of 14.8 units per square mile (5.7 units/km^{2}), of which 87 (75.0%) were occupied. Of these, 72 (82.8%) were owner-occupied, and 15 (17.2%) were occupied by renters.

=== 2010 ===
The 2010 United States census reported that Mono City had a population of 172. The population density was 31.7 inhabitants per square mile (12.2/km^{2}). The racial makeup of Mono City was 156 (90.7%) White, 0 (0.0%) African American, 1 (0.6%) Native American, 2 (1.2%) Asian, 0 (0.0%) Pacific Islander, 2 (1.2%) from other races, and 11 (6.4%) from two or more races. Hispanic or Latino of any race were 37 persons (21.5%).

The Census reported that 172 people (100% of the population) lived in households, 0 (0%) lived in non-institutionalized group quarters, and 0 (0%) were institutionalized.

There were 63 households, out of which 21 (33.3%) had children under the age of 18 living in them, 44 (69.8%) were opposite-sex married couples living together, 1 (1.6%) had a female householder with no husband present, 3 (4.8%) had a male householder with no wife present. There were 6 (9.5%) unmarried opposite-sex partnerships, and 0 (0%) same-sex married couples or partnerships. 8 households (12.7%) were made up of individuals, and 2 (3.2%) had someone living alone who was 65 years of age or older. The average household size was 2.73. There were 48 families (76.2% of all households); the average family size was 2.94.

The population was spread out, with 41 people (23.8%) under the age of 18, 7 people (4.1%) aged 18 to 24, 48 people (27.9%) aged 25 to 44, 61 people (35.5%) aged 45 to 64, and 15 people (8.7%) who were 65 years of age or older. The median age was 41.0 years. For every 100 females, there were 91.1 males. For every 100 females age 18 and over, there were 95.5 males.

There were 94 housing units at an average density of 17.3 per square mile (6.7/km^{2}), of which 45 (71.4%) were owner-occupied, and 18 (28.6%) were occupied by renters. The homeowner vacancy rate was 0%; the rental vacancy rate was 0%. 126 people (73.3% of the population) lived in owner-occupied housing units and 46 people (26.7%) lived in rental housing units.

=== 2000 ===
The 2000 United States Census reported the population of Mono City to be 126. In 2000, 8.7% of the population was under 5 years old, 13% were from 5 to 17, 68% were from 18 to 64, and 8.7% were over 65. Seventy-nine percent of the households were owner occupied and 21% were rented. The California Department of Finance projects the population to increase to 159 by 2020 and to 171 in 2030.

== Fire protection district ==
Mono City is the seat of the Mono City Fire Protection District, which was established in 1972. The fire protection district covers an area of approximately 0.7 square miles (1.8 km^{2}).

== Education ==
Mono City is served by the Eastern Sierra Unified School District for grades PK-12.
