= Mill Creek (Mono Lake) =

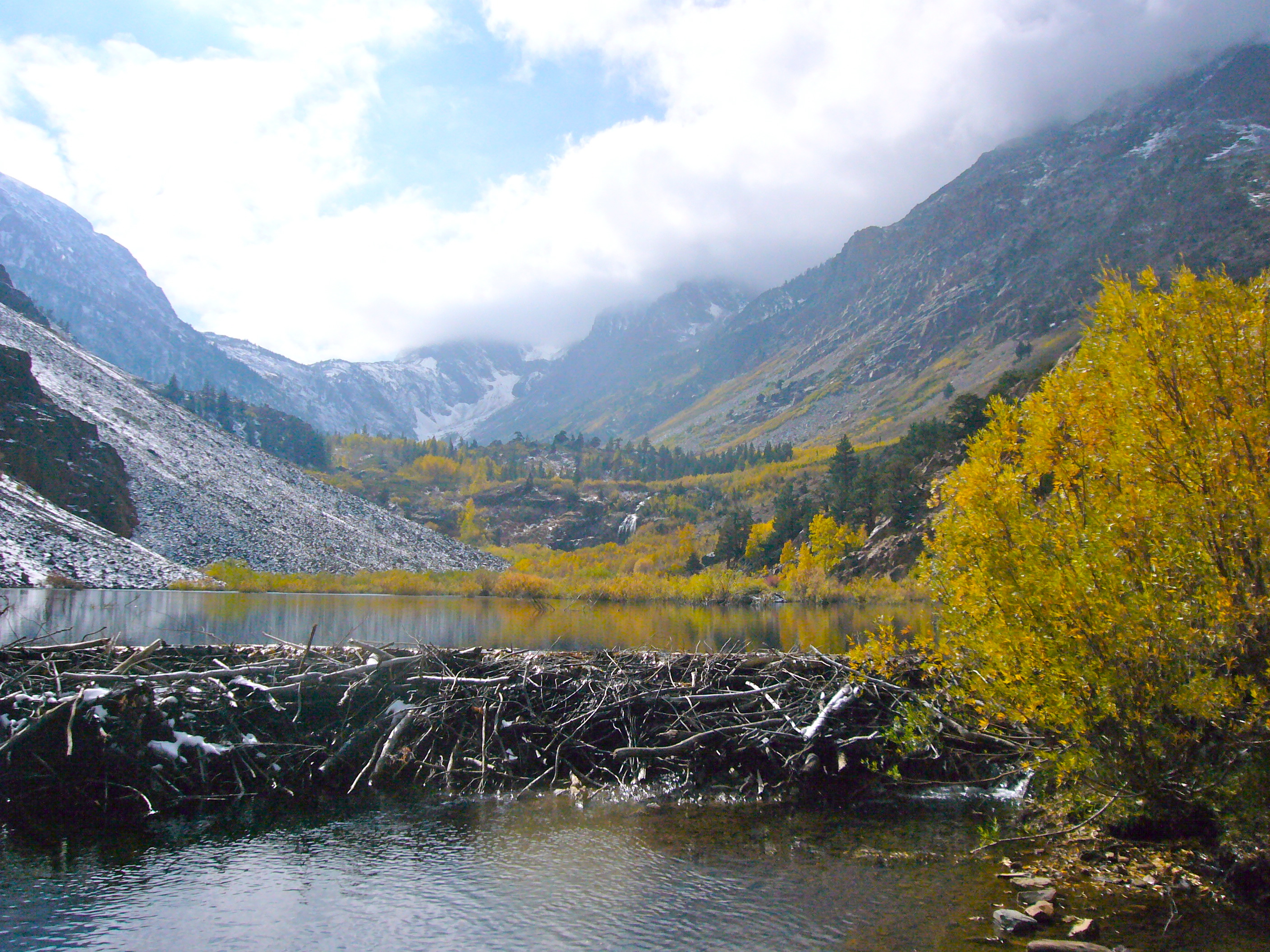
- Beaver dam on Mill Creek in Lundy Canyon

Location
- Country: United States
- State: California
- Region: Mono and Tuolumne County
- City: Mono City

Physical characteristics
- Source: Lake Cascade
  - location: Sierra Nevada
  - coordinates: 37°59′06″N 119°18′29″W
  - elevation: 10,400 ft (3,200 m)
- Mouth: Mono Lake
  - location: Mono City, California
  - coordinates: 38°00′58″N 119°07′42″W
  - elevation: 6,378 ft (1,944 m)
- Length: 14.5 mi (23.3 km)
- Basin size: 24.7 mi^{2} (64 km^{2})
- Discharge
  - location: Below Lundy Lake
  - average: 25.6 cu ft/s (0.72 m^{3}/s)

Basin features
- Tributaries
  - right: South Fork Mill Creek, Deer Creek (Tehama County, California)

Mill Creek is a 14.5-mile-long (23.3 km) perennial stream that flows east from the Sierra Nevada Mountain Range into Mono Lake, in Mono County, California. It courses through Lundy Canyon and Lundy Lake, before passing through Mono City, California on its way to Mono Lake.

== Watershed ==
Approximately 81 percent of the annual runoff of Mill Creek in the Mono Basin has been attributed to snowmelt, occurring from April through September, and the remaining 19 percent of the annual streamflow occurs as base flow from October through March.

== History ==
William O. Lundy obtained a timber patent here in 1880. The settlement near the May lundy Mine was first known as Mill Creek. diverted to generate hydroelectric power in the early years of the 20th century. In 1911, the Lundy Project was completed and the dam raised the natural outlet of Lundy Lake 37 feet to an elevation of 7,803 feet so that hydroelectric power could be generated by the Southern Sierra Power Company.

== Ecology ==
It is controversial whether North American beaver (Castor canadensis) were native to Mill Creek and the Mono Basin. Beaver were introduced, or re-introduced, along Mill Creek in the Mono Basin by the California Department of Fish and Game in the 1950s. The population thrives above Lundy Reservoir for nearly the entire length of upper Lundy Canyon and in recent years has been spreading to nearby creeks, including Wilson Creek, DeChambeau Creek, and Lee Vining Creek.

== Hiking ==
The Lundy Canyon trail leads past several cascading waterfalls to Lake Helen, then becomes more moderate in the "20 Lakes Basin". Trails circle toward Saddlebag lake and to the foot of North Peak and Mount Conness on the Yosemite National Park boundary.

== See also ==
- Beaver in the Sierra Nevada
- List of rivers in California
- Mono Lake
