= Excelsior Mountain (Yosemite) =

Mountain in northern Yosemite National Park

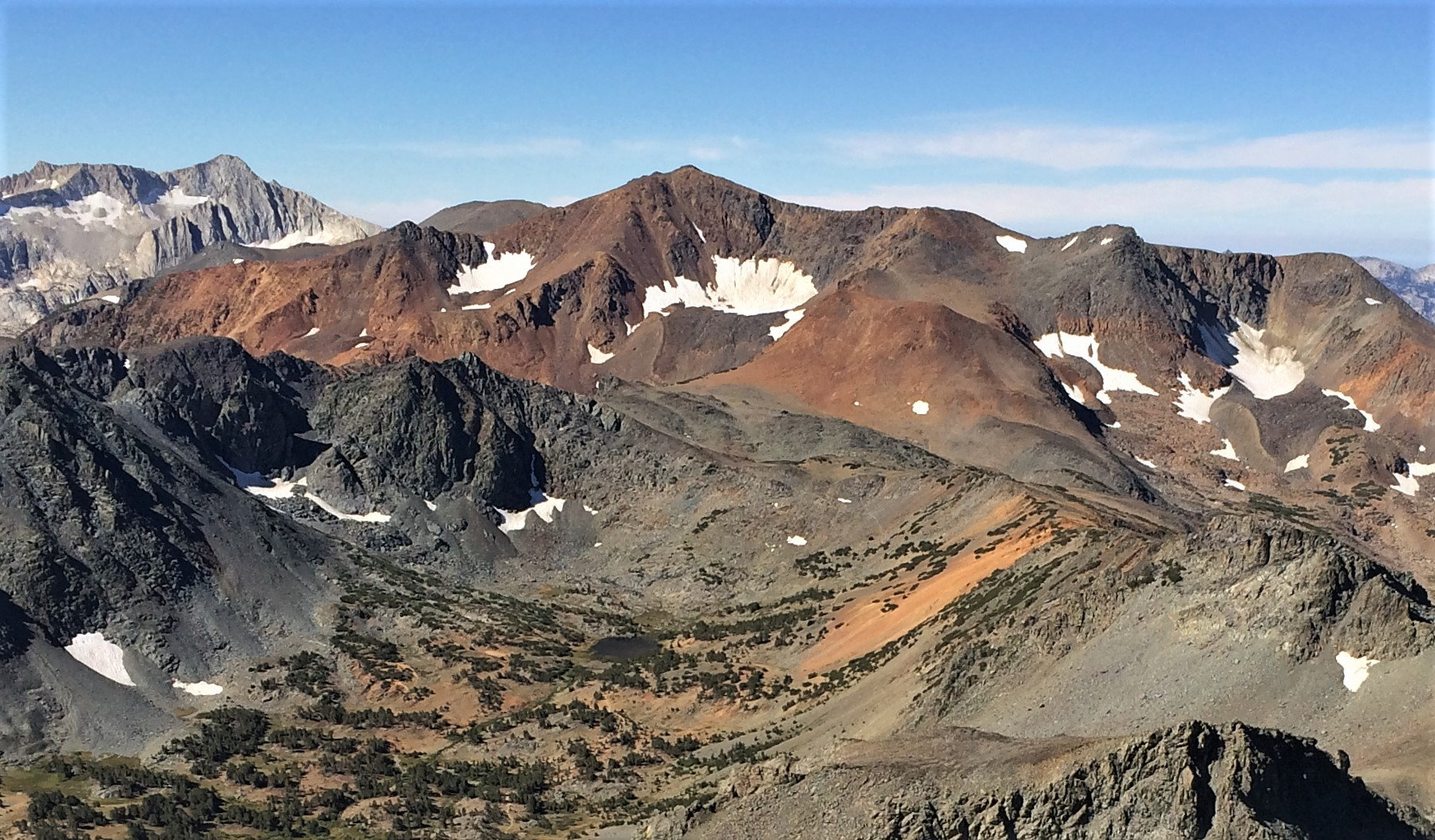
- Northeast aspect, from Dunderberg Peak

Highest point
- Elevation: 12,446 ft (3,794 m) NAVD 88
- Prominence: 1,246 ft (380 m)
- Parent peak: Dunderberg Peak
- Coordinates: 38°1′28″N 119°18′19″W

Geography
- Location within California Location within the United States
- Location: Yosemite National Park, Mono County, Tuolumne County, California, U.S.
- Parent range: Ritter Range, Sierra Nevada
- Topo map: USGS Tenaya Lake

Climbing
- Easiest route: From Virginia Lakes Trailhead, class 2

Excelsior Mountain is the 21st-highest mountain in Yosemite National Park, on the northeastern border of Yosemite. It is the next high peak, north of Mount Conness. Excelsior Mountain is mostly made of rust-colored metamorphic rock, similar to Mount Dana, which is also close.

== Climate ==
Climate data for Excelsior Mountain (Yosemite) 38.0242 N, 119.3074 W, Elevation: 12,014 ft (3,662 m) (1991–2020 normals)
Month	Jan	Feb	Mar	Apr	May	Jun	Jul	Aug	Sep	Oct	Nov	Dec	Year
Mean daily maximum °F (°C)	29.8 (−1.2)	28.8 (−1.8)	31.6 (−0.2)	35.1 (1.7)	42.6 (5.9)	52.2 (11.2)	59.9 (15.5)	59.3 (15.2)	53.7 (12.1)	44.8 (7.1)	36.1 (2.3)	29.8 (−1.2)	42.0 (5.6)
Daily mean °F (°C)	20.0 (−6.7)	18.2 (−7.7)	20.6 (−6.3)	23.6 (−4.7)	30.7 (−0.7)	40.0 (4.4)	47.3 (8.5)	46.6 (8.1)	41.2 (5.1)	33.3 (0.7)	25.8 (−3.4)	20.0 (−6.7)	30.6 (−0.8)
Mean daily minimum °F (°C)	10.1 (−12.2)	7.7 (−13.5)	9.6 (−12.4)	12.1 (−11.1)	18.8 (−7.3)	27.8 (−2.3)	34.8 (1.6)	34.0 (1.1)	28.6 (−1.9)	21.8 (−5.7)	15.6 (−9.1)	10.3 (−12.1)	19.3 (−7.1)
Average precipitation inches (mm)	9.30 (236)	7.91 (201)	7.26 (184)	3.77 (96)	2.33 (59)	0.67 (17)	0.64 (16)	0.49 (12)	0.63 (16)	2.48 (63)	3.79 (96)	7.86 (200)	47.13 (1,196)
Source: PRISM Climate Group

== Near to Excelsior Mountain ==
All of the following are near to Excelsior Mountain:

Mountain	Distance
Shepherd Crest	2.3 miles (3.7 km)
Black Mountain	2.8 miles (4.5 km)
Epidote Peak	3.9 miles (6.3 km)
Camiaca Peak	4.3 miles (6.9 km)
Mount Scowden	4.4 miles (7.1 km)
Page Peaks	4.7 miles (7.6 km)
North Peak	4.8 miles (7.7 km)
Grey Butte	4.8 miles (7.7 km)
Dunderberg Peak	5.2 miles (8.4 km)
Mount Olsen	5.5 miles (8.9 km)
Gabbro Peak	5.6 miles (9.0 km)
Sheep Peak	5.6 miles (9.0 km)
Stanton Peak	6.3 miles (10.1 km)
Mount Conness	6.5 miles (10.5 km)
Virginia Peak	6.5 miles (10.5 km)
Gilcrest Peak	6.7 miles (10.8 km)
Twin Peaks	7.9 miles (12.7 km)
Mount Warren	8.0 miles (12.9 km)
White Mountain	8.7 miles (14.0 km)
Whorl Mountain	8.8 miles (14.2 km)
False False White Peak	9.4 miles (15.1 km)
False White Peak	9.8 miles (15.8 km)
Tioga Peak	9.8 miles (15.8 km)

== See also ==
- List of highest mountains of Yosemite National Park

== External links and references ==
- A topographic map, of Excelsior Mountain area
- Another topo map
- One hike, up Excelsior Mountain
