= Gabbro Peak =

Mountain in the state of California

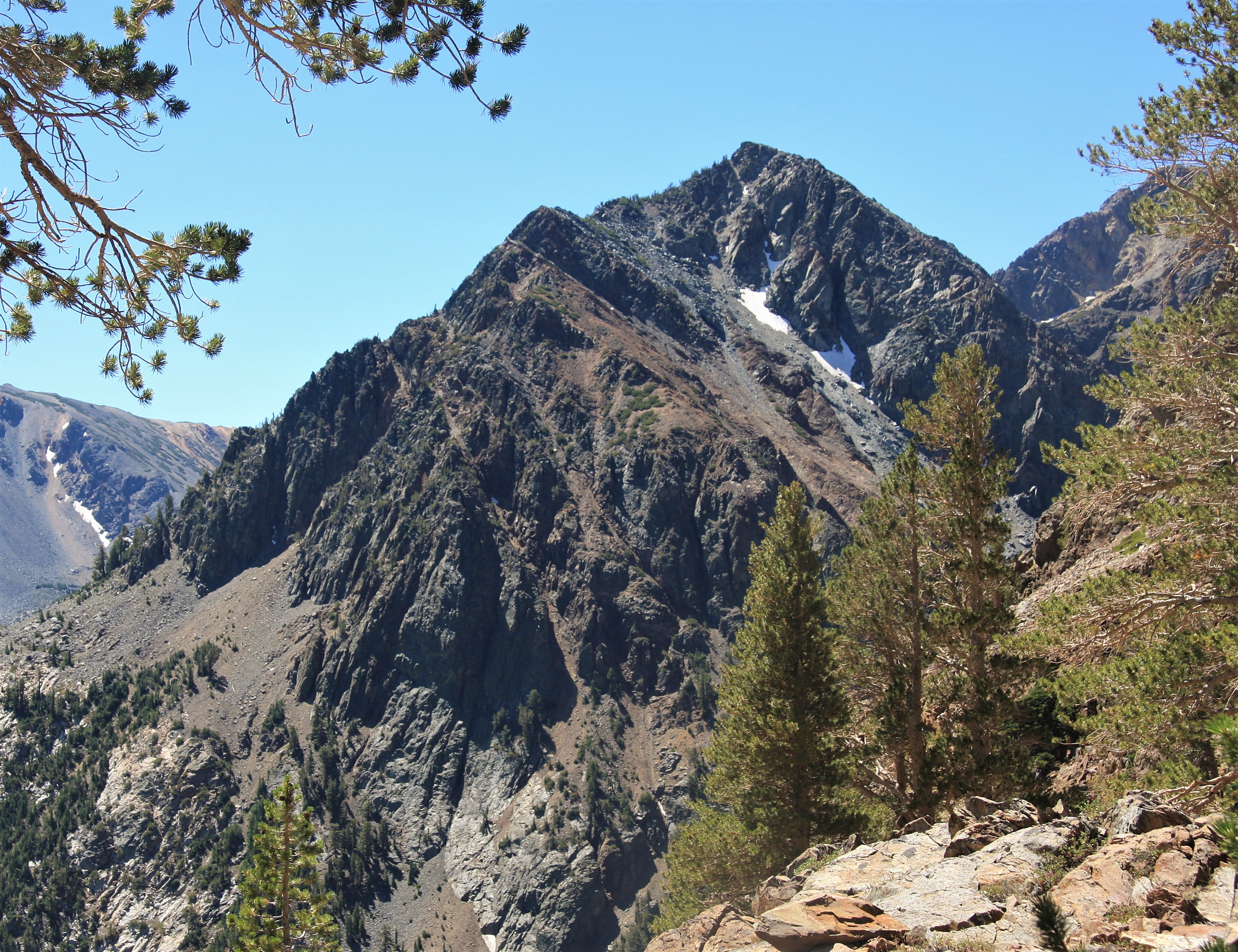
- North aspect, from West Lake area

Highest point
- Elevation: 11,033 ft (3,363 m)
- Prominence: 360 ft (110 m)
- Parent peak: Camiaca Peak (11,739 ft)
- Isolation: 1.15 mi (1.85 km)
- Coordinates: 38°04′26″N 119°18′45″W

Naming
- Etymology: Gabbro

Geography
- Location within California Location within the United States
- Location: Mono County, California, U.S.
- Parent range: Sierra Nevada
- Topo map: USGS Dunderberg Peak

Climbing
- Easiest route: class 2

Gabbro Peak is an 11,033-foot-elevation (3,363-meter) mountain summit located in the Sierra Nevada mountain range, in Mono County of northern California, United States. The mountain is set in the Hoover Wilderness on land managed by Humboldt–Toiyabe National Forest. The peak is situated one mile outside the boundary of Yosemite National Park, approximately three miles northwest of Virginia Lakes, one-half mile north of Page Peaks, and 2.2 miles (3.5 km) west-northwest of Dunderberg Peak. Topographic relief is significant as the north aspect rises over 2,000 feet (610 meters) above Green Lake in one-half mile. Gabbro Peak may be climbed from East Lake, or via the Virginia Pass Trail.

== Climate ==
Gabbro Peak is located in an alpine climate zone. Most weather fronts originate in the Pacific Ocean, and travel east toward the Sierra Nevada mountains. As fronts approach, they are forced upward by the peaks (orographic lift), causing moisture in the form of rain or snowfall to drop onto the range. Precipitation runoff from this mountain drains into headwaters of West Fork Green Creek which is a tributary of the Walker River.

== See also ==
- List of mountain peaks of California
