= Epidote Peak (California) =

Mountain of Mono County, California

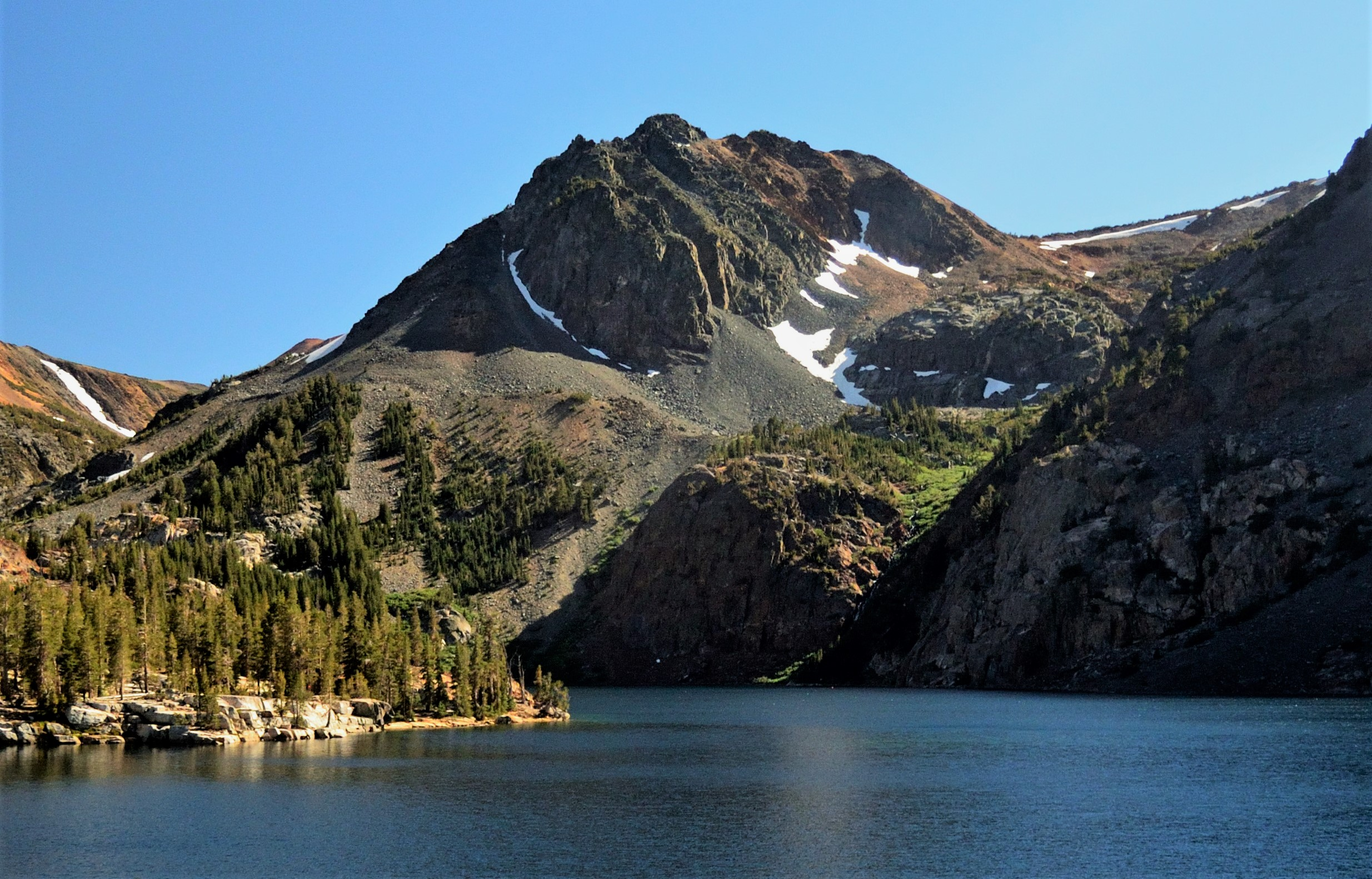
- North aspect, from East Lake

Highest point
- Elevation: 10,964 ft (3,342 m)
- Prominence: 164 ft (50 m)
- Parent peak: Camiaca Peak (11,739 ft)
- Isolation: 0.96 mi (1.54 km)
- Coordinates: 38°03′34″N 119°18′17″W

Naming
- Etymology: Epidote

Geography
- Location within California Location within the United States
- Location: Mono County, California, U.S.
- Parent range: Sierra Nevada
- Topo map: USGS Dunderberg Peak

Geology
- Rock age: Cretaceous
- Mountain type: Fault block
- Rock type: Metamorphic rock

Climbing
- First ascent: 1917
- Easiest route: class 2 Southeast slope

Epidote Peak is a 10,964-foot-elevation (3,342-meter) mountain summit located in the Sierra Nevada mountain range, in Mono County of northern California, United States. The mountain is set in the Hoover Wilderness on land managed by Humboldt–Toiyabe National Forest. The peak is situated one mile outside the boundary of Yosemite National Park, approximately one mile east of line parent Camiaca Peak, and 1.7 miles (2.7 km) west of Dunderberg Peak. Topographic relief is significant as the north aspect rises 1,500 feet (460 meters) above East Lake in one-half mile. The first ascent of Epidote Peak was made by several Sierra Club members in 1917. This landform's toponym, which refers to the greenish mineral epidote present here, has been officially adopted by the United States Board on Geographic Names, and has been in print since at least 1919.

== Climate ==
Epidote Peak is located in an alpine climate zone. Most weather fronts originate in the Pacific Ocean, and travel east toward the Sierra Nevada mountains. As fronts approach, they are forced upward by the peaks (orographic lift), causing moisture in the form of rain or snowfall to drop onto the range. Precipitation runoff from this mountain drains into headwaters of the East and West Forks of Green Creek, which is a tributary of the Walker River.

== See also ==
- Gabbro Peak

== Gallery ==
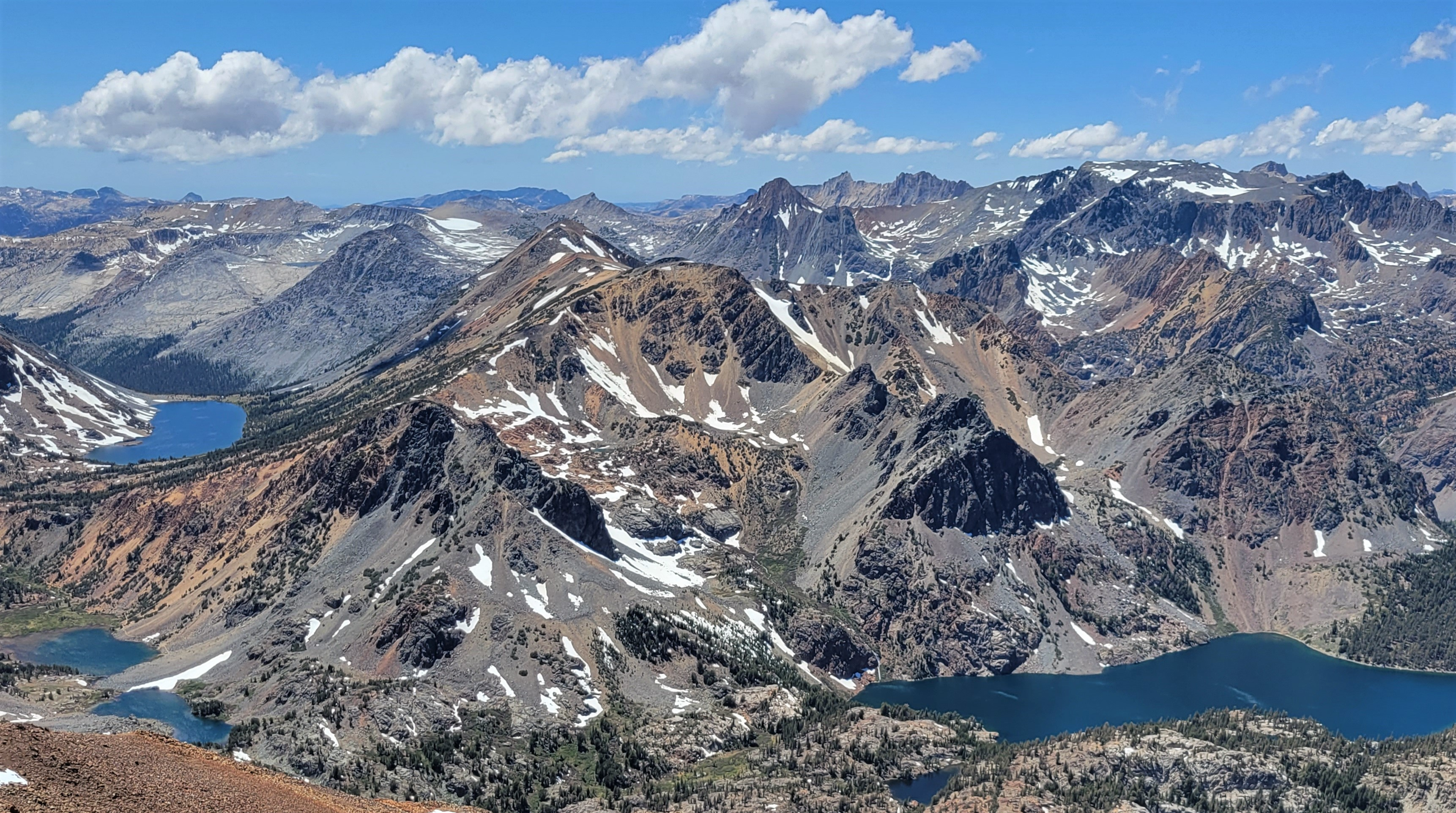
Epidote Peak is black feature in lower left. View from Dunderberg Peak looking west. Summit Lake to left, Hoover Lakes lower left, East Lake lower right. Camiaca Peak (reddish) left of center, Gabbro Peak lower right, Twin Peaks upper right.

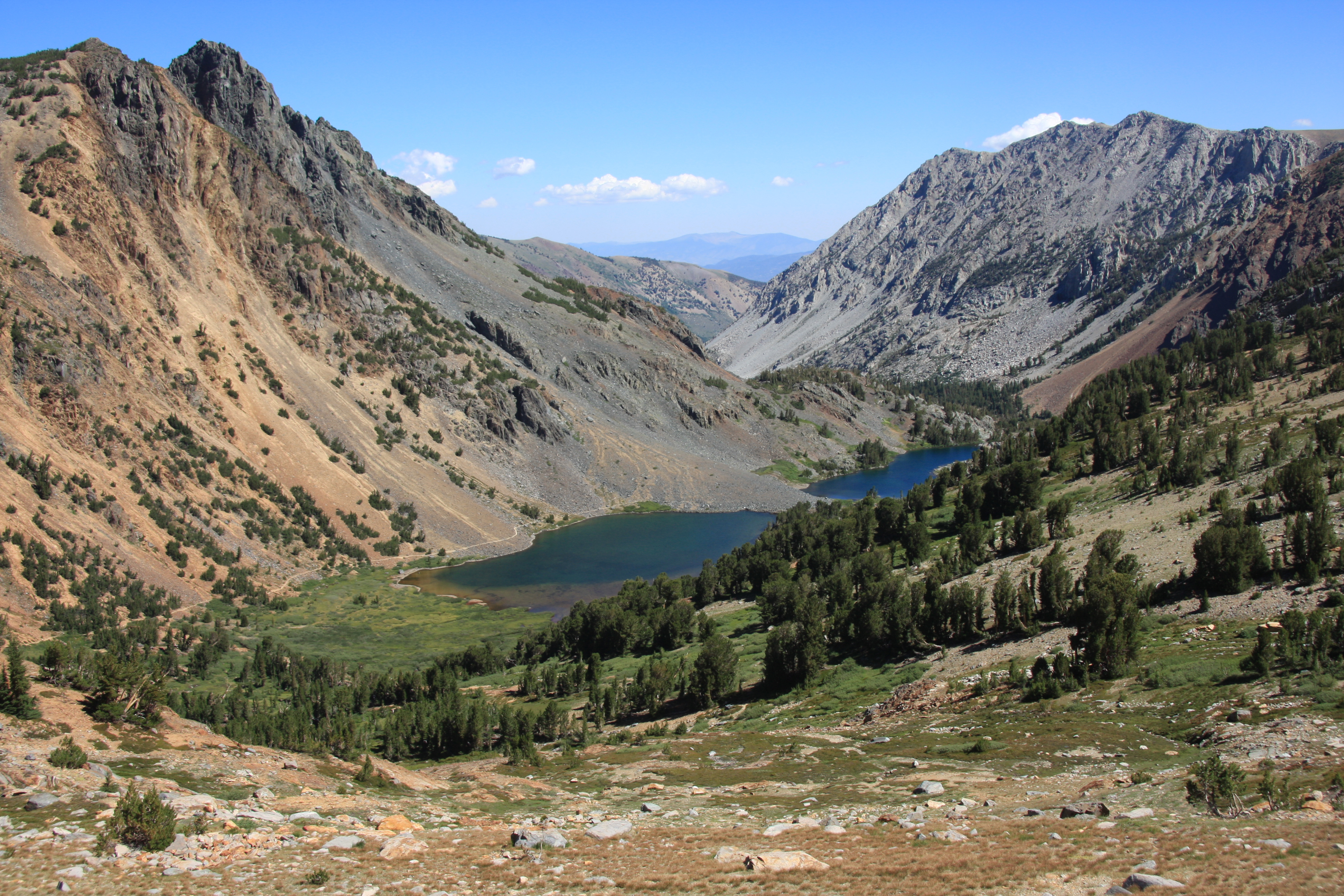
South aspect of Epidote Peak (left) above Hoover Lakes
