= Black Mountain (Mono County, California) =

Mountain in northern california

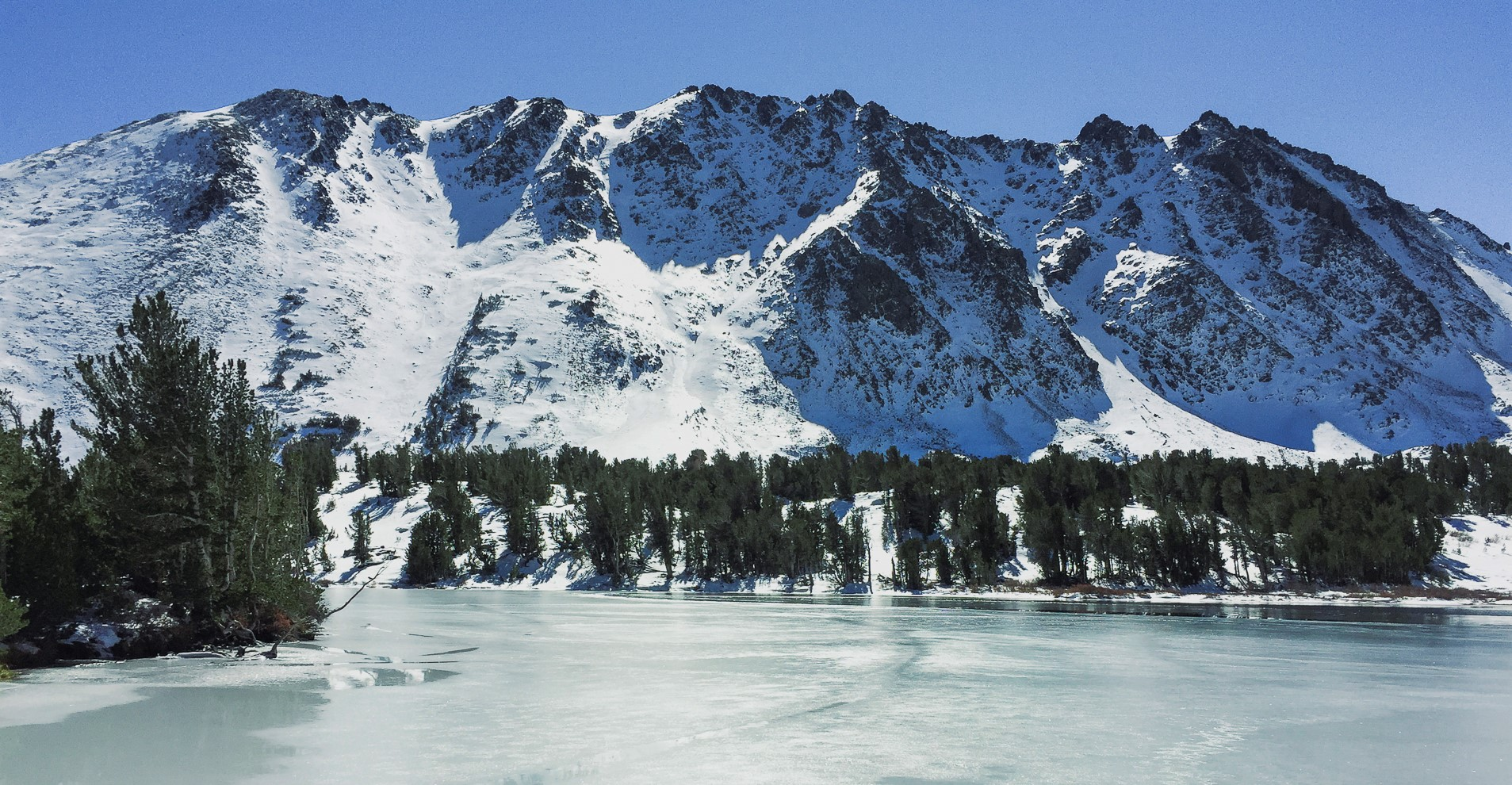
- North aspect, from Frog Lakes

Highest point
- Elevation: 11,797 ft (3,596 m)
- Prominence: 497 ft (151 m)
- Parent peak: Excelsior Mountain (12,446 ft)
- Isolation: 1.75 mi (2.82 km)
- Coordinates: 38°02′19″N 119°16′43″W

Geography
- Location within California Location within the United States
- Location: Mono County, California, U.S.
- Parent range: Sierra Nevada
- Topo map: USGS Dunderberg Peak

Geology
- Rock type: Tuff

Climbing
- First ascent: 1905
- Easiest route: class 2

Black Mountain is an 11,797-foot-elevation (3,596-meter) summit located in the Sierra Nevada mountain range, in Mono County of northern California, United States. The mountain is set within the Hoover Wilderness, on the common boundary shared by Inyo National Forest with Humboldt–Toiyabe National Forest, and 1.5 mile outside the boundary of Yosemite National Park. The peak is situated immediately southwest above Virginia Lakes, 1.8 miles (2.9 km) northeast of line parent Excelsior Mountain, and 1.8 miles (2.9 km) south of Dunderberg Peak. Topographic relief is significant as the north aspect rises 1,500 feet (460 meters) above Cooney Lake in one-half mile (0.80 km), and the south aspect rises 3,600 feet (1,100 meters) above Lundy Canyon in one and a half miles (2.4 km). The first ascent of the summit was made in 1905 by George R. Davis, Albert Hale Sylvester, and Pearson Chapman, all with the United States Geological Survey.

== Climate ==
Black Mountain is located in an alpine climate zone. Most weather fronts originate in the Pacific Ocean, and travel east toward the Sierra Nevada mountains. As fronts approach, they are forced upward by the peaks (orographic lift), causing moisture in the form of rain or snowfall to drop onto the range. Precipitation runoff from this mountain drains north into Virginia Creek which is a tributary of the Walker River, and south into Mill Creek which drains to Mono Lake.

== See also ==
- Geology of the Yosemite area

== Gallery ==
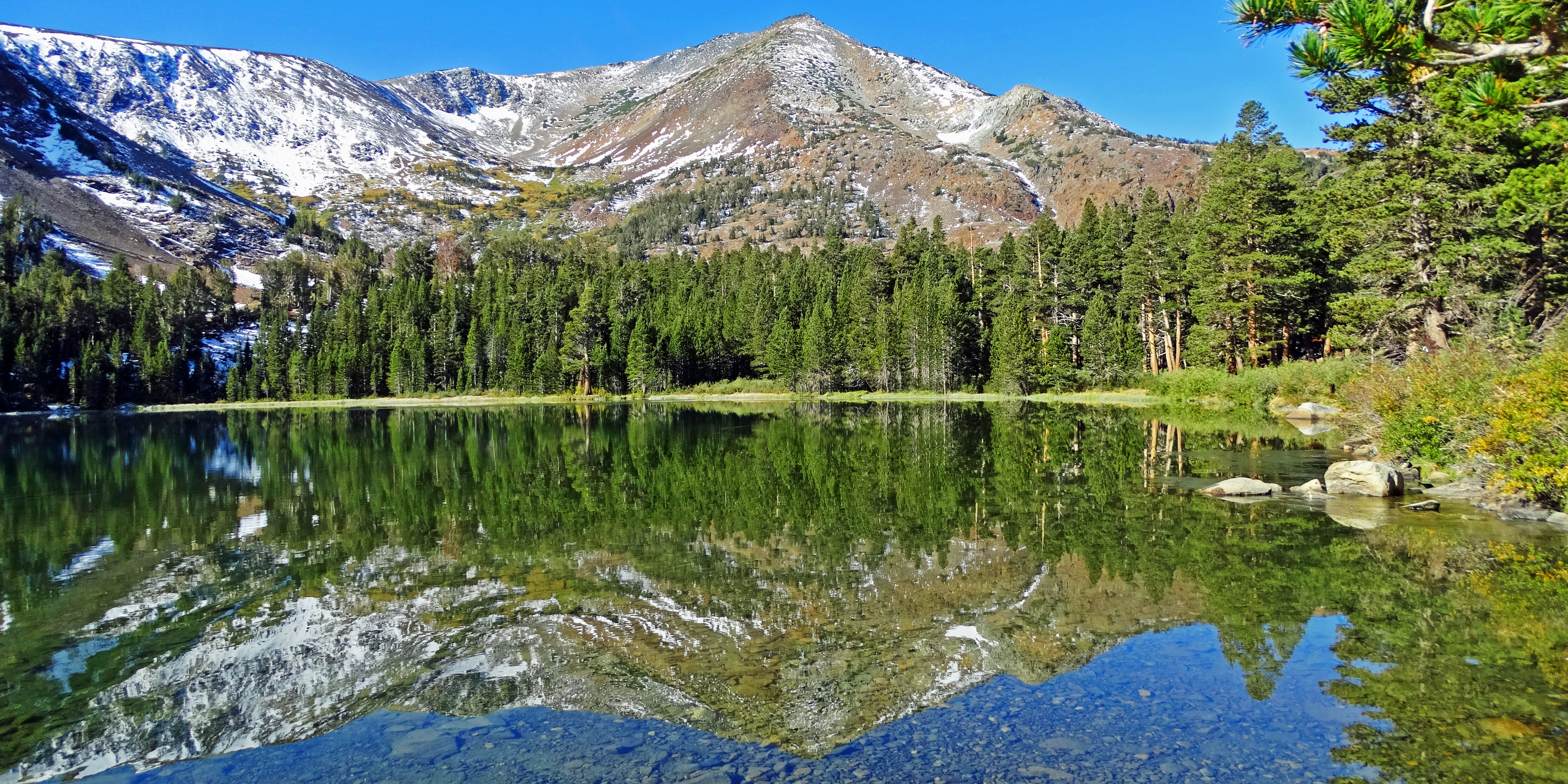
East aspect of Black Mountain reflected n Virginia Lakes

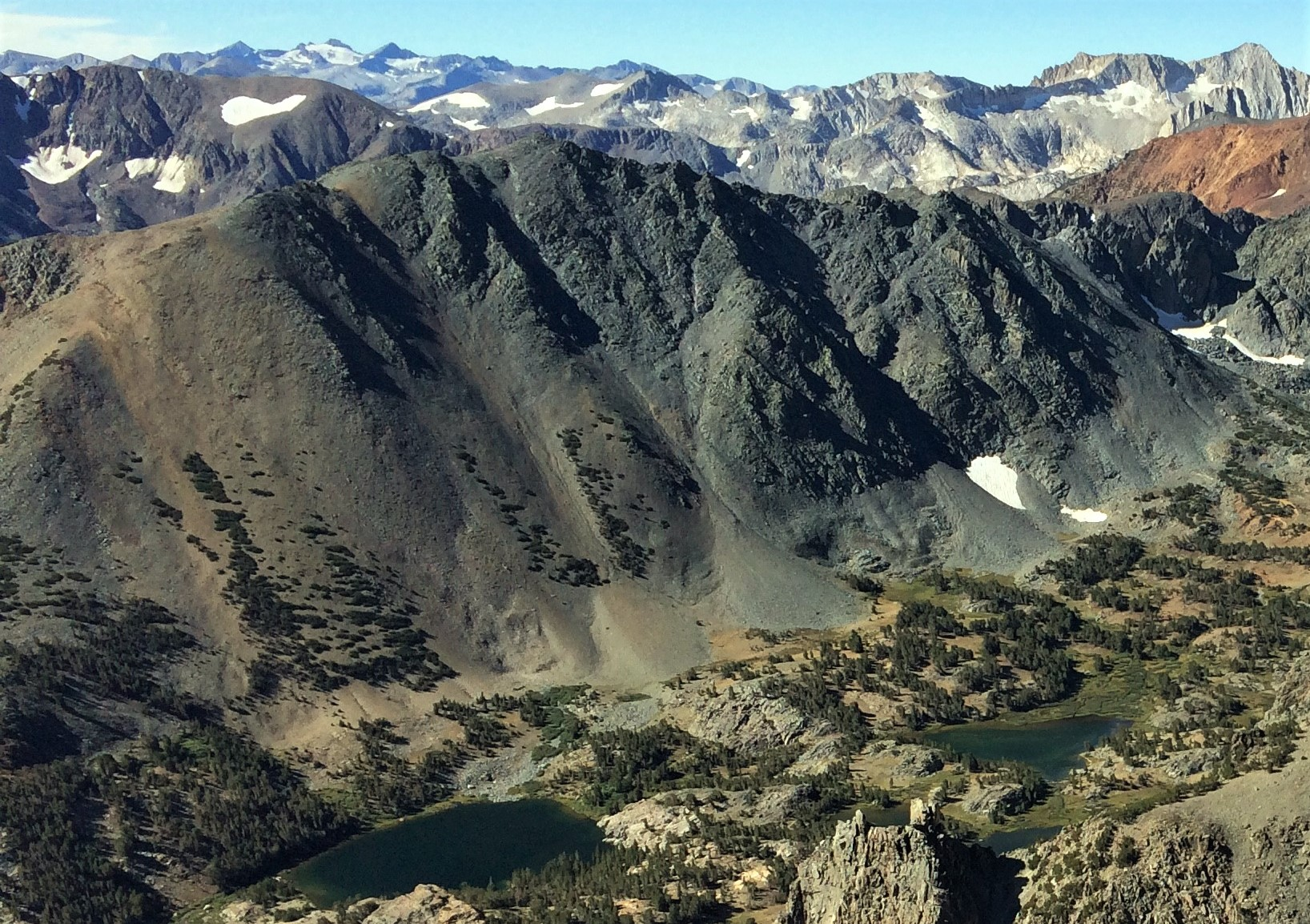
North aspect seen from Dunderberg Peak

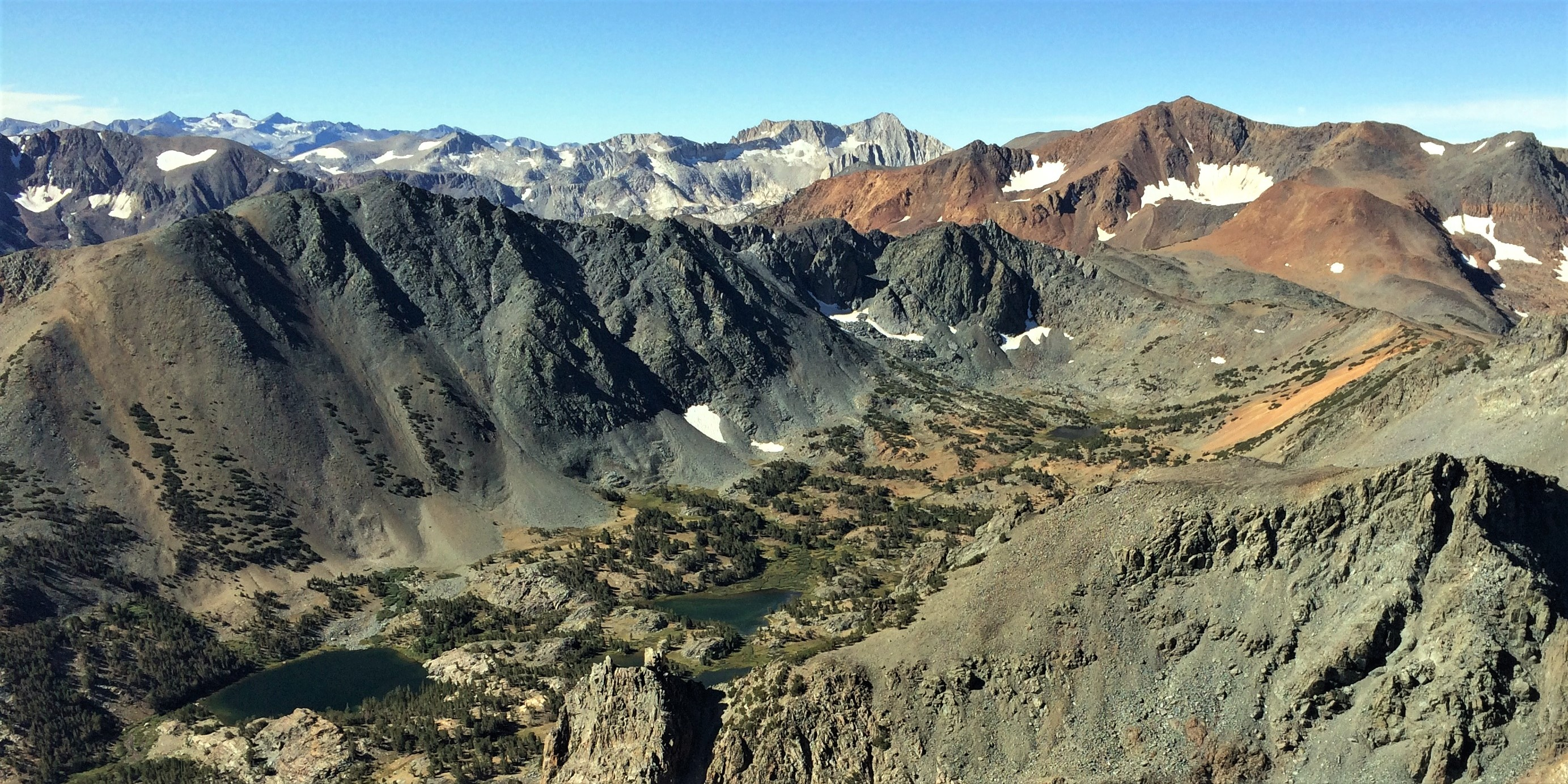
North aspects of Black Mountain (left) and Excelsior Mountain (right, reddish) seen from Dunderberg Peak. Mount Conness centered on the distant horizon.

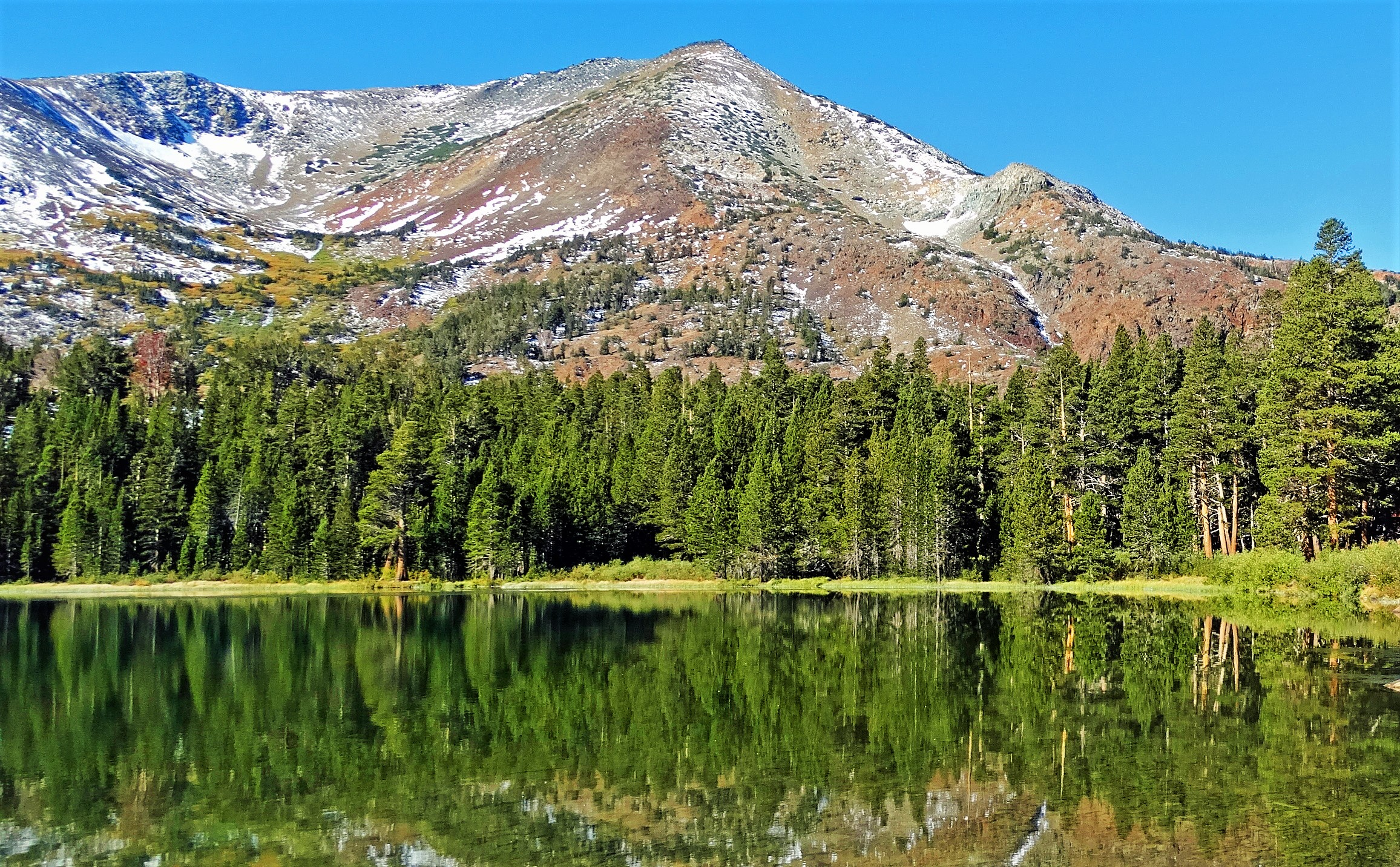
East aspect

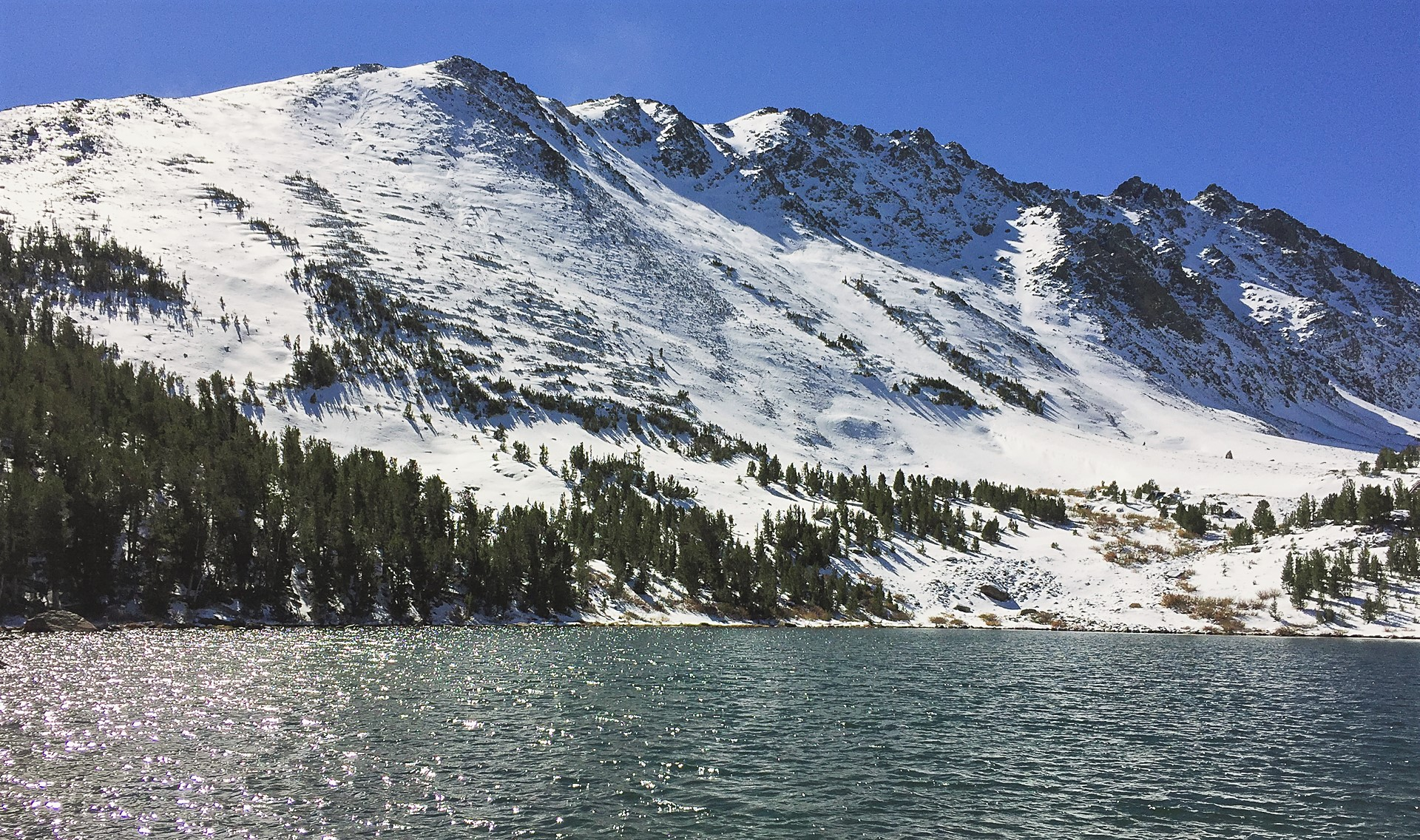
Black Mountain seen from Cooney Lake

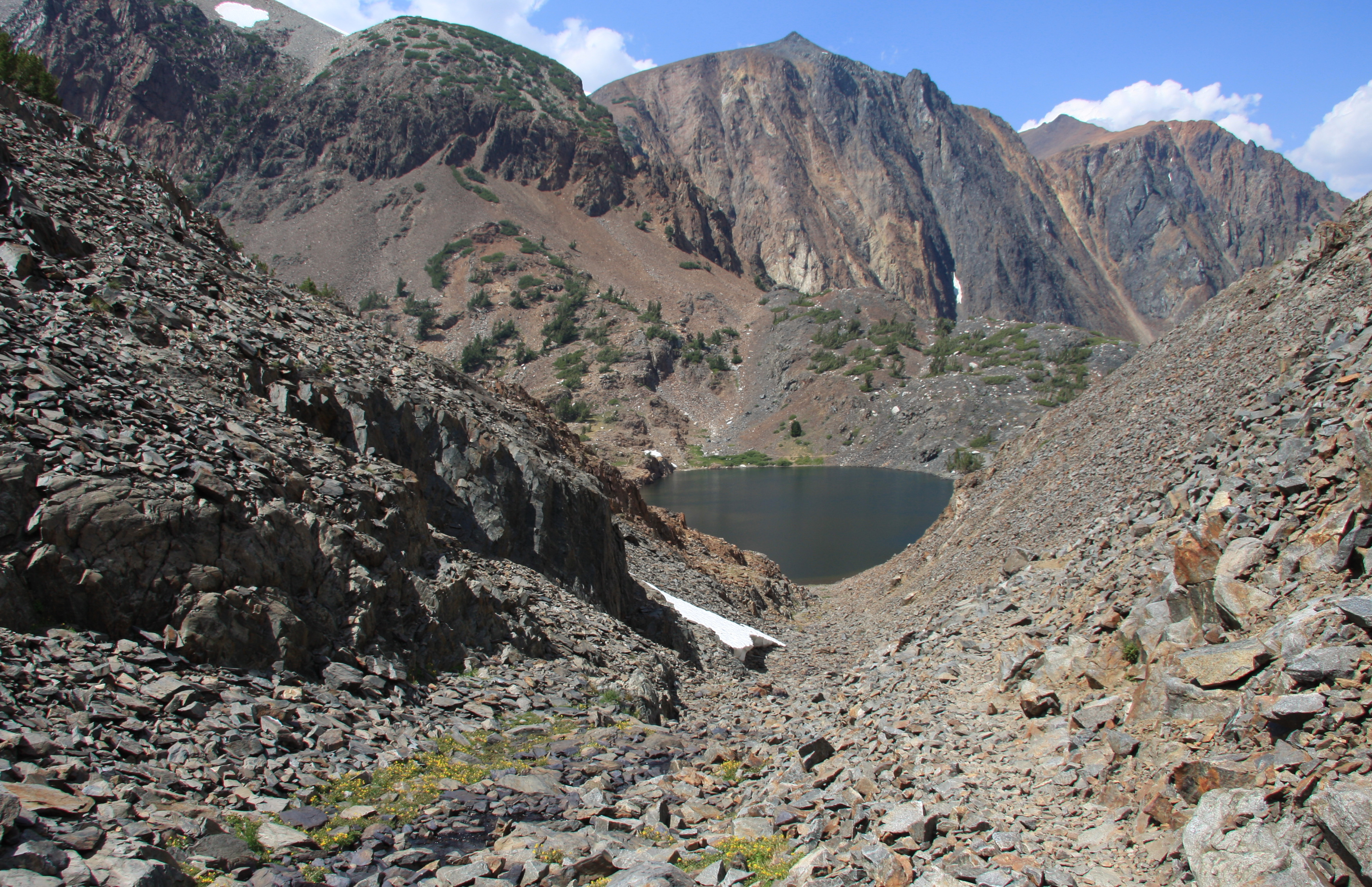
South aspect of Black Mountain beyond Lake Helen
