= Page Peaks =

Mountain of Mono County, California

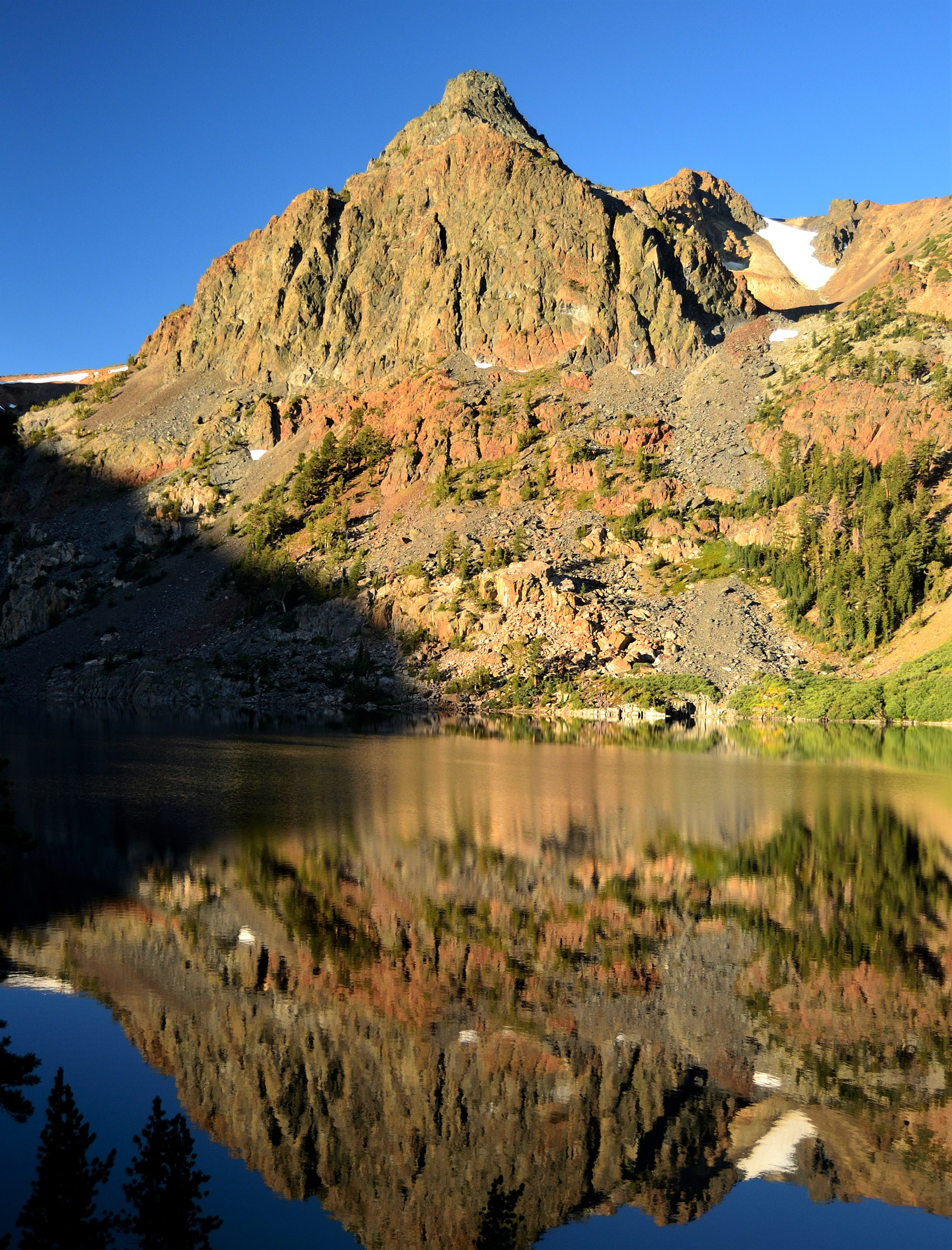
- Northeast aspect, from East Lake

Highest point
- Elevation: 10,929 ft (3,331 m)
- Prominence: 120 ft (37 m)
- Parent peak: Camiaca Peak (11,739 ft)
- Isolation: 0.49 mi (0.79 km)
- Coordinates: 38°04′00″N 119°18′41″W

Geography
- Location within California Location within the United States
- Location: Mono County, California, U.S.
- Parent range: Sierra Nevada
- Topo map: USGS Dunderberg Peak

Geology
- Rock age: Cretaceous
- Mountain type: Fault block
- Rock type: Metamorphic rock

Climbing
- Easiest route: class 2 via East Lake

Page Peaks is a 10,929-foot-elevation (3,331-meter) mountain summit located in the Sierra Nevada mountain range, in Mono County of northern California, United States. The mountain is set in the Hoover Wilderness on land managed by Humboldt–Toiyabe National Forest. The summit is situated one mile outside the boundary of Yosemite National Park, and less than one mile east of line parent Camiaca Peak. Topographic relief is significant as the east aspect rises 1,400 feet (430 meters) above East Lake in one-quarter mile. This landform's toponym, which commemorates a miner and prospector named Page, has been officially adopted by the United States Board on Geographic Names.

== Climate ==
Page Peaks is located in an alpine climate zone. Most weather fronts originate in the Pacific Ocean, and travel east toward the Sierra Nevada mountains. As fronts approach, they are forced upward by the peaks (orographic lift), causing moisture in the form of rain or snowfall to drop onto the range. Precipitation runoff from this mountain drains into East Lake, thence West Fork Green Creek, which is a tributary of the Walker River.

== Gallery ==
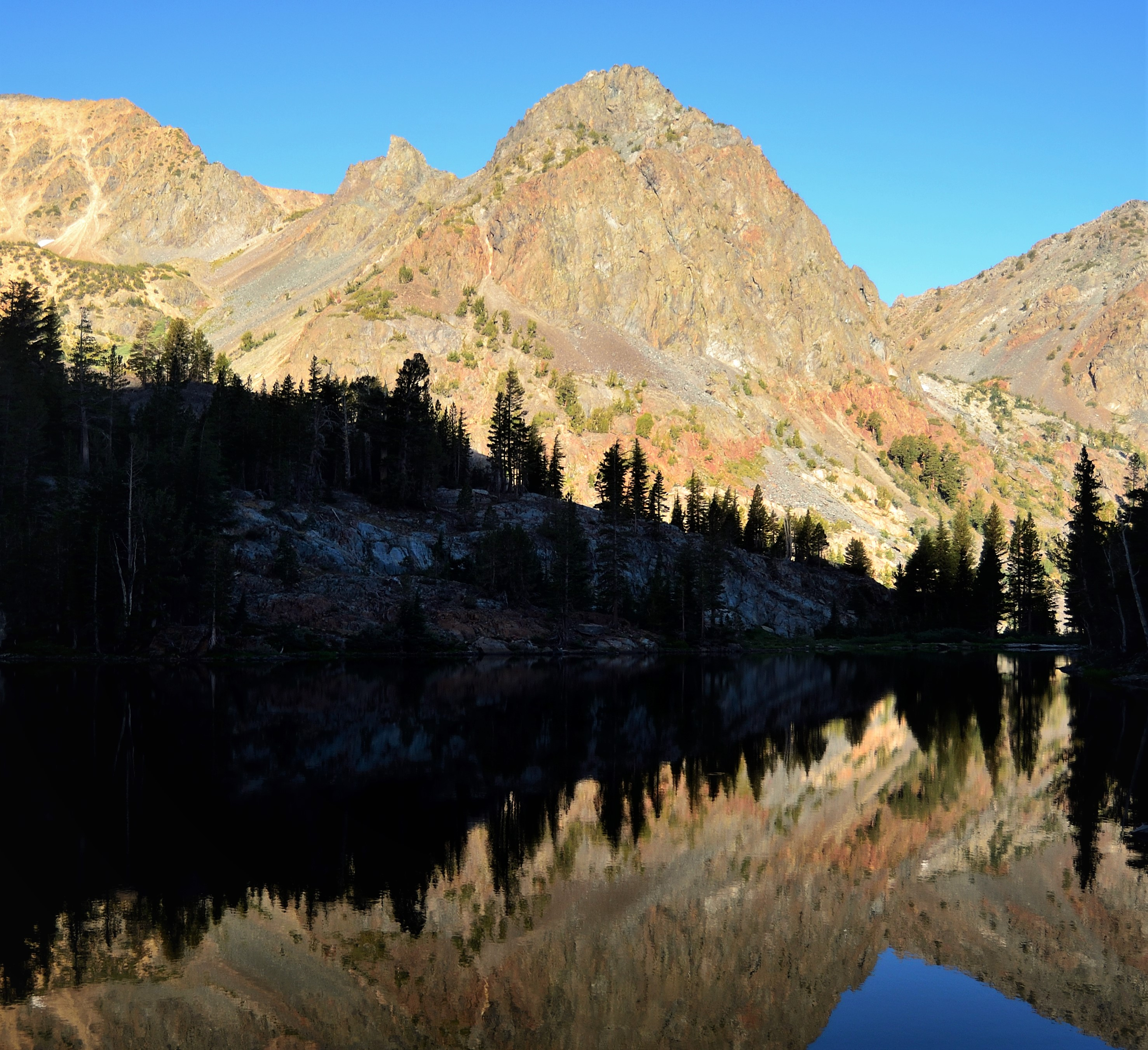
East aspect

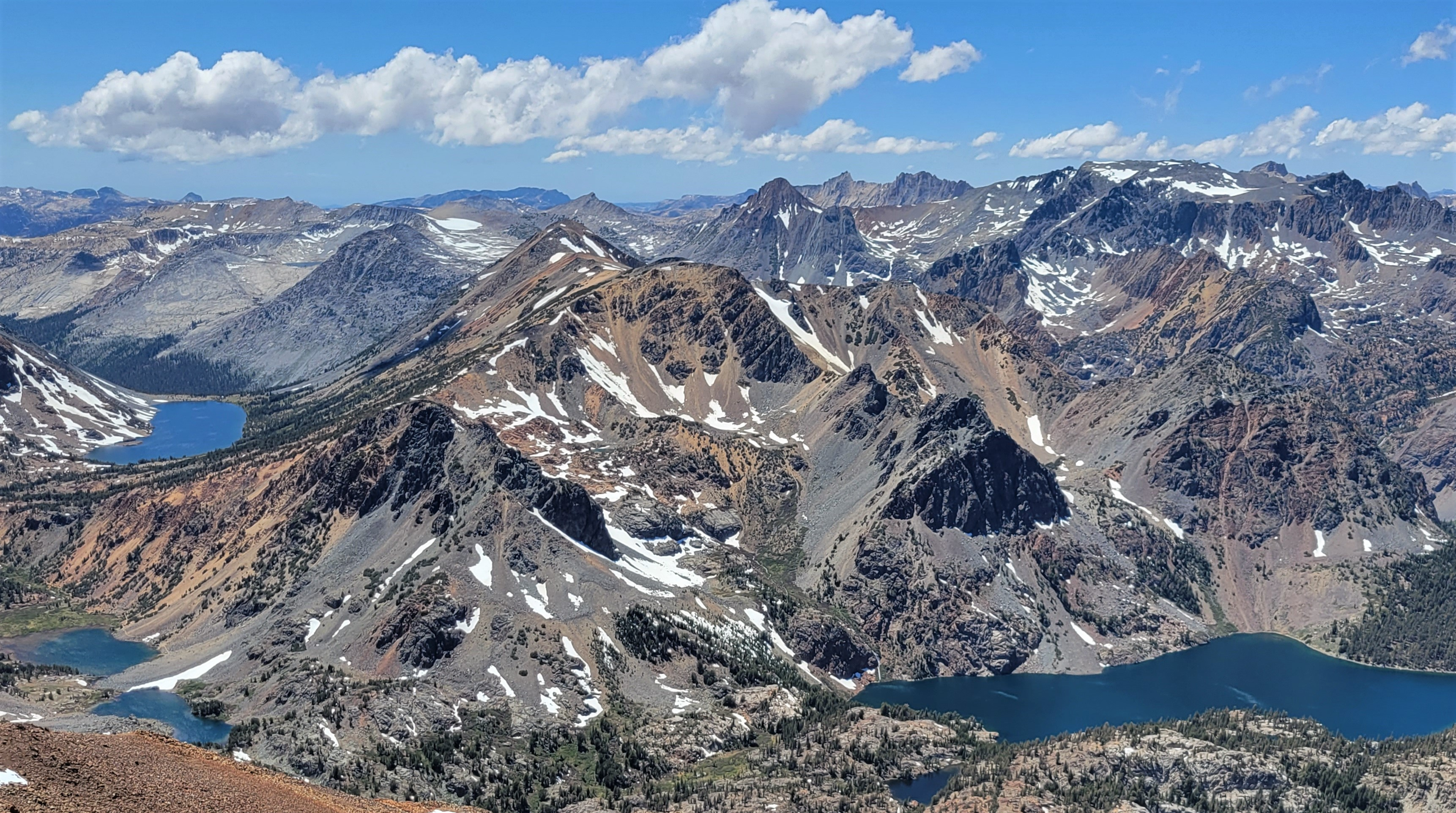
View from Dunderberg Peak looking west. Page Peaks is the dark triangle above East Lake. Summit Lake to left, Hoover Lakes lower left, East Lake lower right. Camiaca Peak (reddish) left of center, Gabbro Peak lower right.
