= Shepherd Crest =

Ridge in the northern part of Yosemite National Park

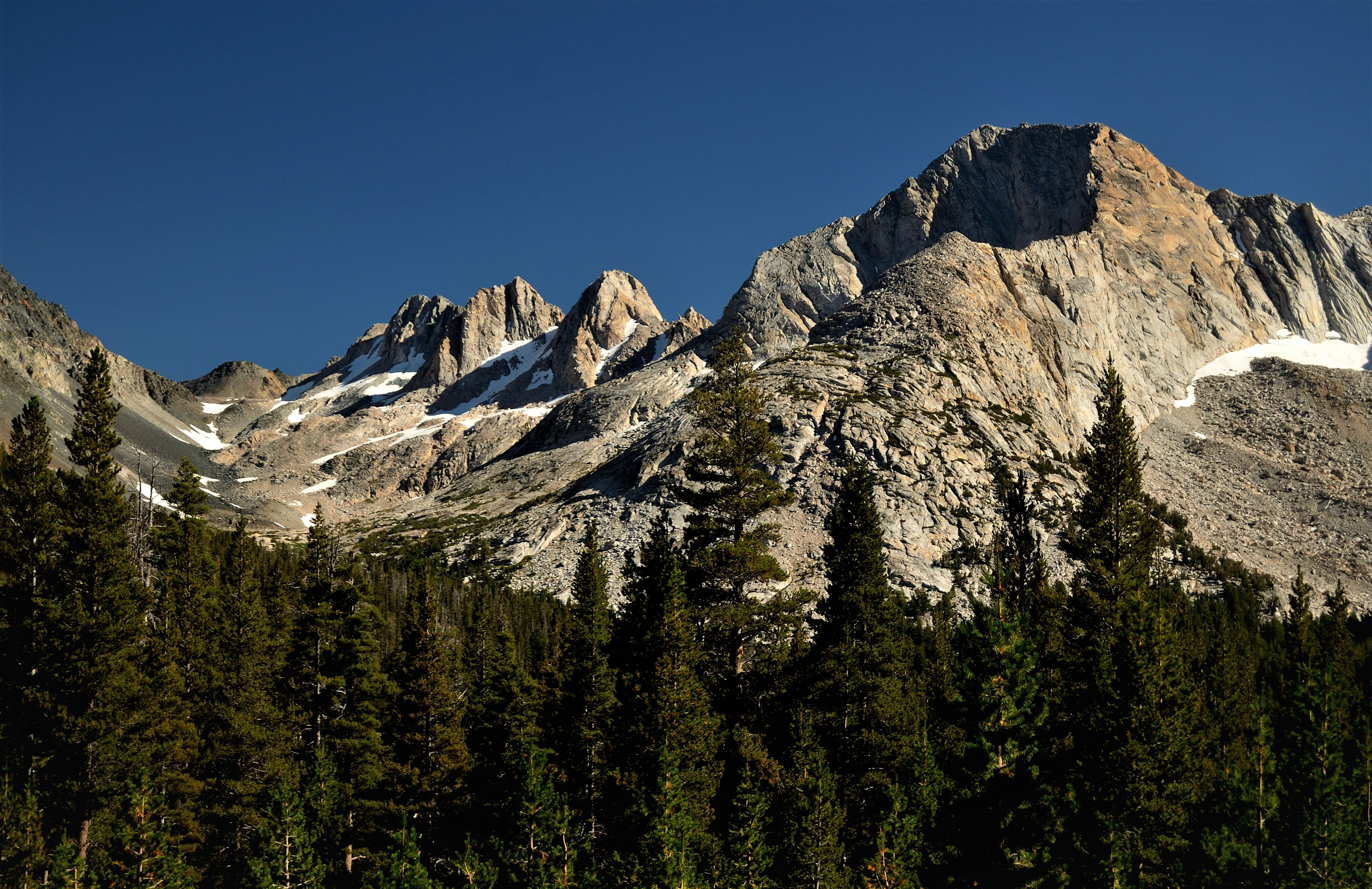
- North aspect, west peak to right

Highest point
- Elevation: 12,020 ft (3,660 m) NAVD 88
- Prominence: 560 ft (171 m)
- Coordinates: 38°00′15″N 119°18′42″W

Geography
- Location within California Location within the United States
- Location: Yosemite National Park; Tuolumne County, California, U.S.
- Parent range: Ritter Range, Sierra Nevada
- Topo map: USGS Dunderberg Peak

Geology
- Rock age: Cretaceous
- Mountain type: Fault block
- Rock type: Granodiorite

Shepherd Crest is a ridge in the northern part of Yosemite National Park that divides into Shepherd Crest East and Shepherd Crest West. Shepherd Crest is between North Peak and Excelsior Mountain and near Mount Conness, Mount Warren, Mono Lake, and Tuolumne Meadows.

== Climate ==
According to the Köppen climate classification system, Shepherd Crest is located in an alpine climate zone. Most weather fronts originate in the Pacific Ocean, and travel east toward the Sierra Nevada mountains. As fronts approach, they are forced upward by the peaks (orographic lift), causing moisture in the form of rain or snowfall to drop onto the range.

== Climbing ==
Shepherd Crest has climbs, from class 2 scrambles to a class 5.7 rock climb.

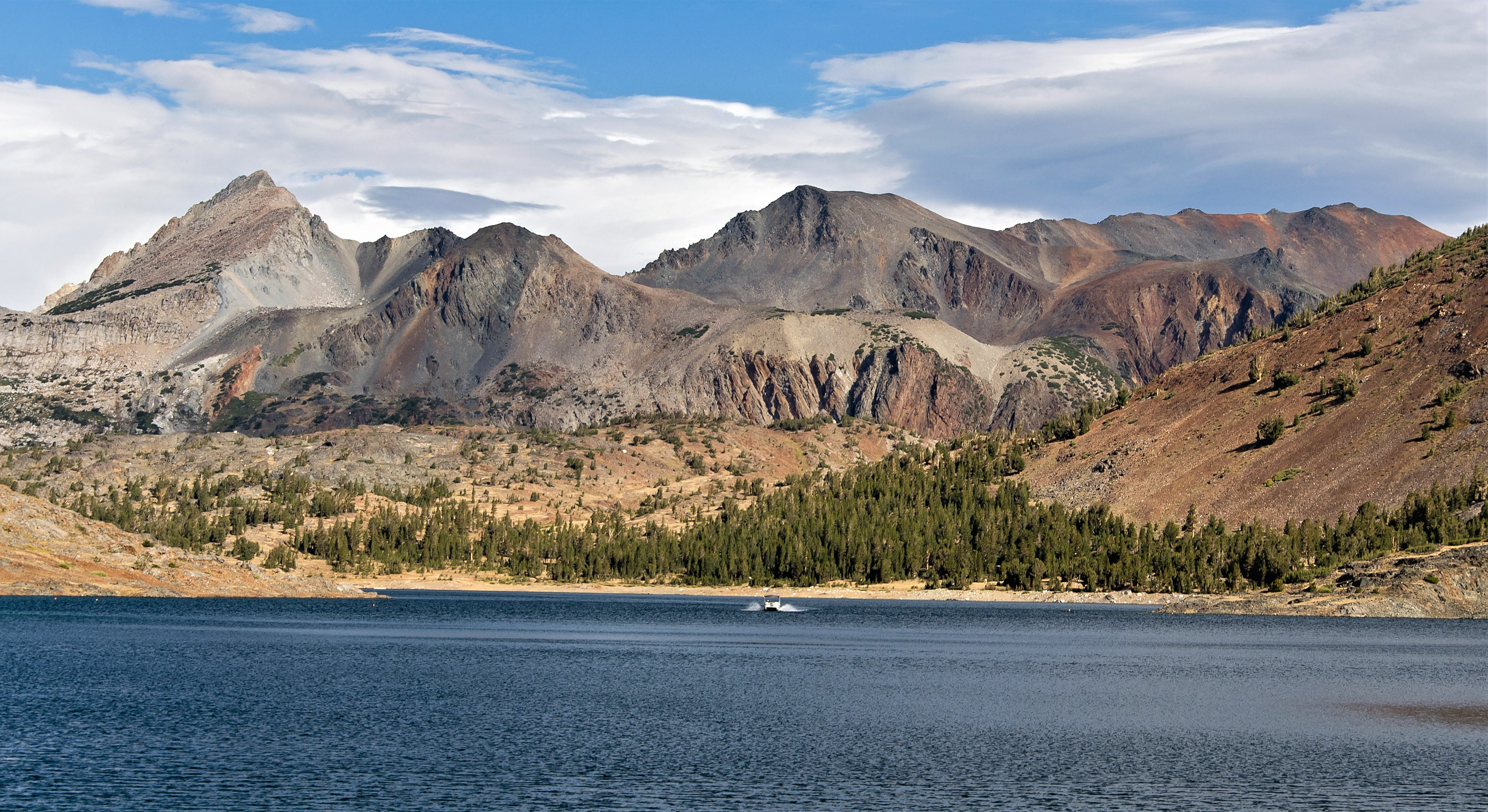
Shepherd Crest (left), Excelsior Mountain (right)
