= Camiaca Peak =

Mountain in California, United States

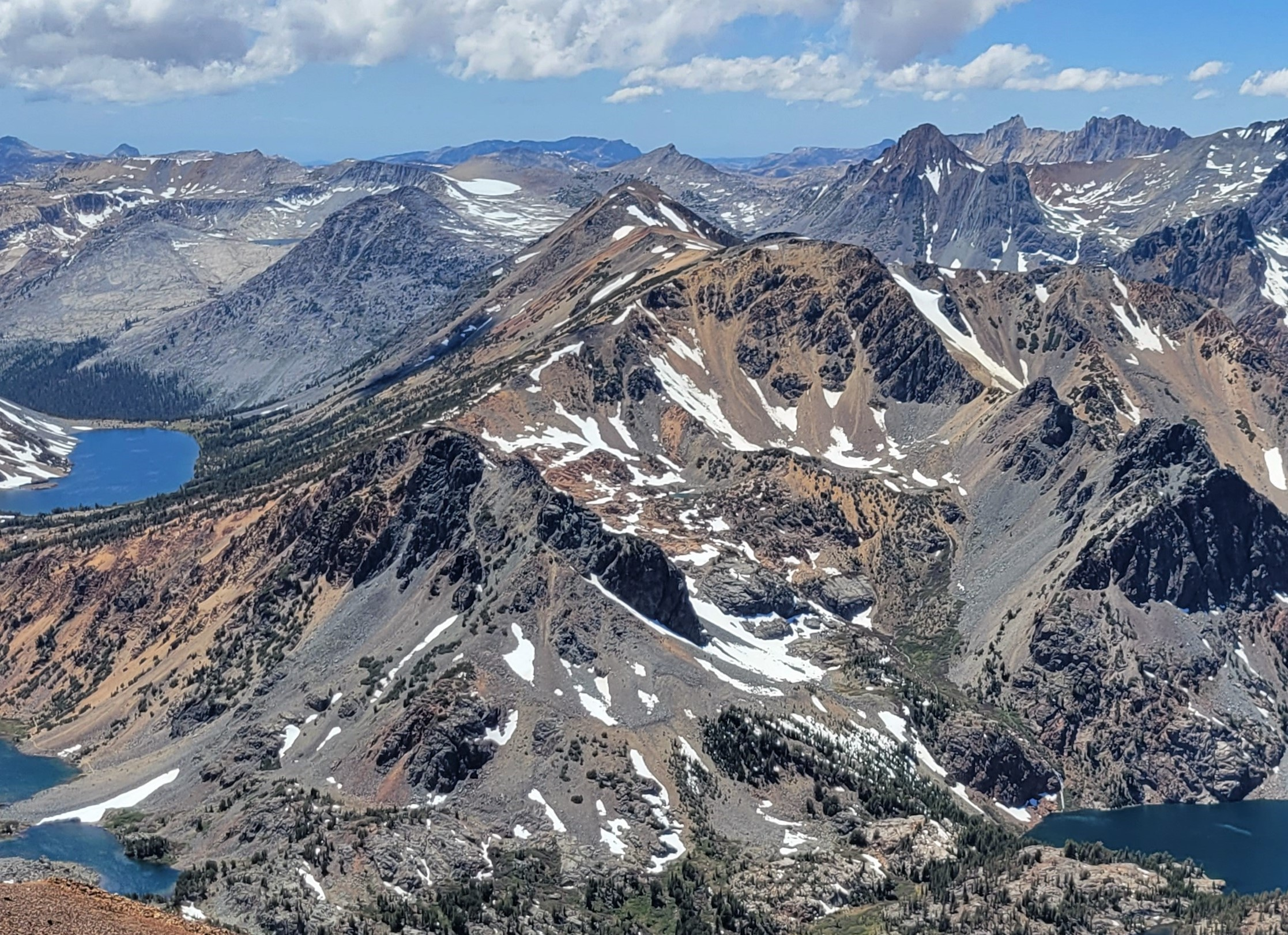
- East aspect, from Dunderberg Peak

Highest point
- Elevation: 11,739 ft (3,578 m)
- Prominence: 1,259 ft (384 m)
- Parent peak: Twin Peaks (12,323 ft)
- Isolation: 1.88 mi (3.03 km)
- Listing: Vagmarken Club Sierra Crest List
- Coordinates: 38°03′36″N 119°19′27″W

Geography
- Location within California Location within the United States
- Location: Yosemite National Park; Tuolumne / Mono counties California, United States
- Parent range: Sierra Nevada
- Topo map: USGS Dunderberg Peak

Geology
- Mountain type: Fault block
- Rock type: Metamorphic rock

Climbing
- First ascent: 1917
- Easiest route: class 2 South slope

Camiaca Peak is an 11,739-foot-elevation (3,578-meter) mountain summit located on the crest of the Sierra Nevada mountain range in northern California, United States. The peak is situated on the common boundary shared by Yosemite National Park with Hoover Wilderness, as well as the border shared by Mono County with Tuolumne County. It is approximately two miles east of Virginia Peak, three miles west of Dunderberg Peak, and Summit Lake lies at the base of the southeast slope. Topographic relief is significant as the west aspect rises nearly 2,000 feet (610 meters) above Return Creek in three-quarters mile.

== History ==
The first ascent of the summit was made in 1917 by Walter L. Huber.

This mountain's toponym was officially adopted in 1932 by the United States Board on Geographic Names. The word "camiaca" possibly derives from the Southern Sierra Miwok "kamyaka" which means "yarrow" (a flowering plant).

== Climate ==
Camiaca Peak is located in an alpine climate zone. Most weather fronts originate in the Pacific Ocean, and travel east toward the Sierra Nevada mountains. As fronts approach, they are forced upward by the peaks (orographic lift), causing moisture in the form of rain or snowfall to drop onto the range. Precipitation runoff from this mountain drains west into Return Creek, and east to Green Creek which is a tributary of Walker River.

== See also ==
- List of mountain peaks of California

== Gallery ==
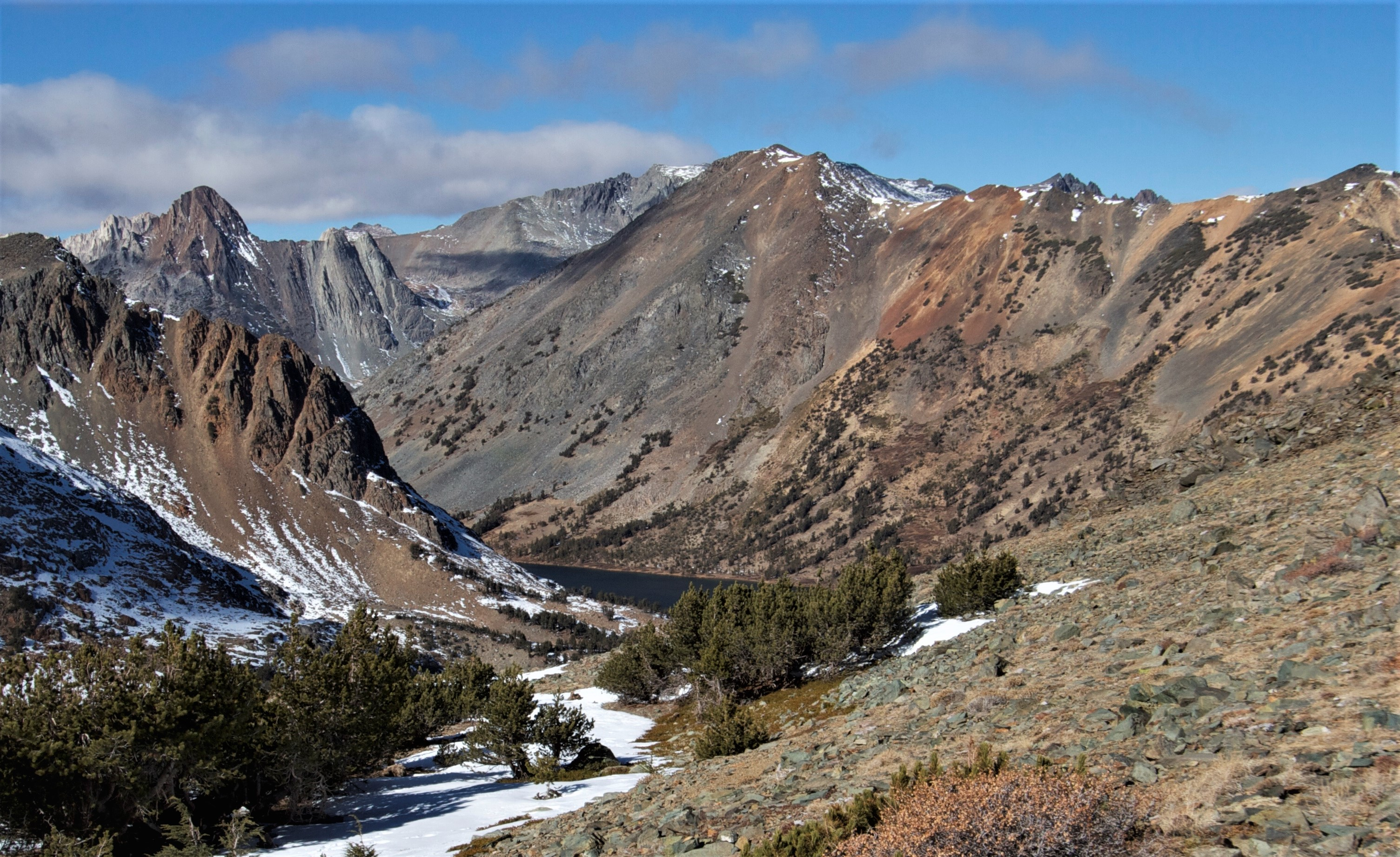
Southeast aspect centered, with Summit Lake visible below

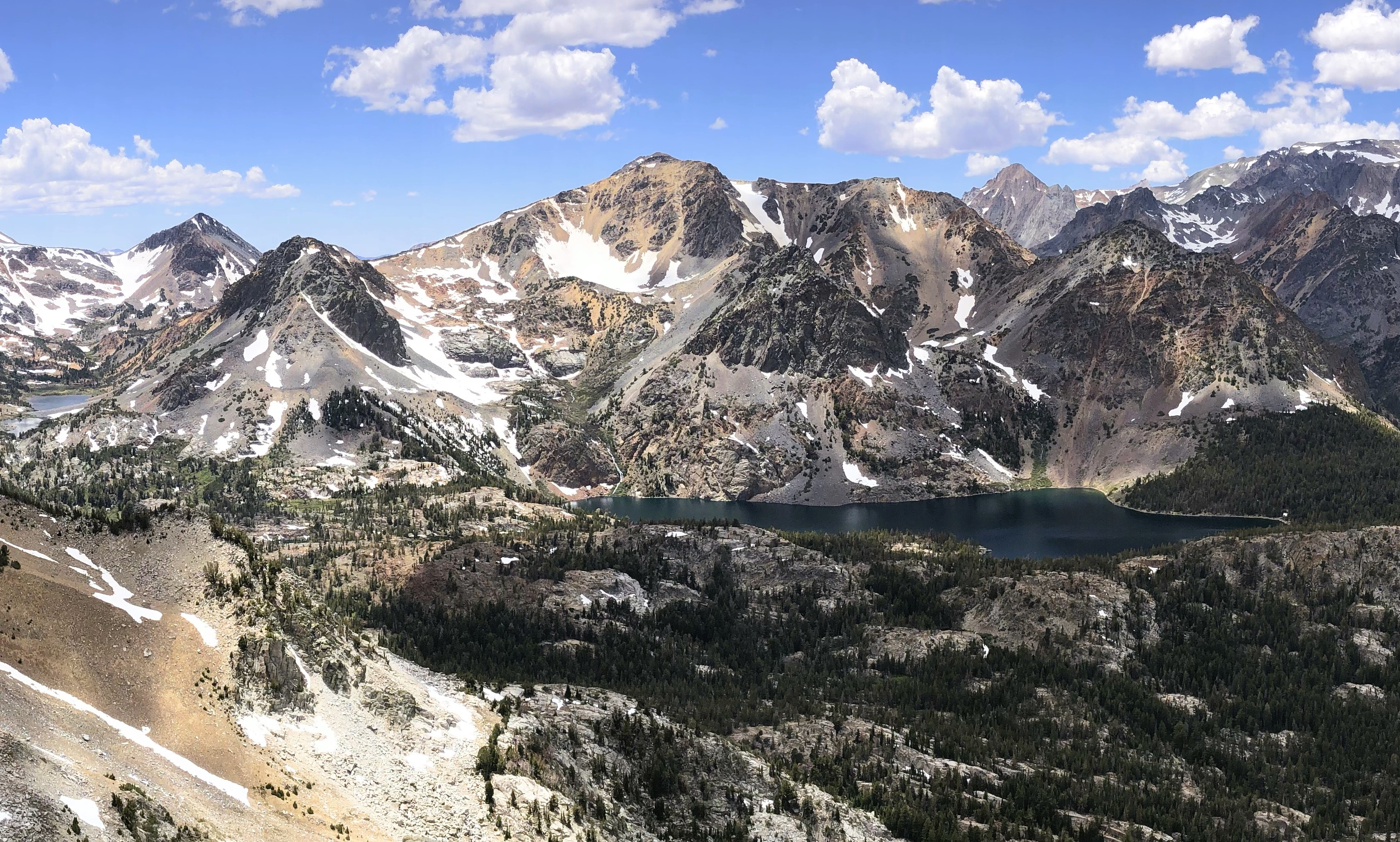
Northeast aspect of Camiaca Peak with East Lake at the foot of the peak
