= Virginia Lakes =

Lake in the state of California, United States

Virginia Lakes Basin
- Virginia Lakes
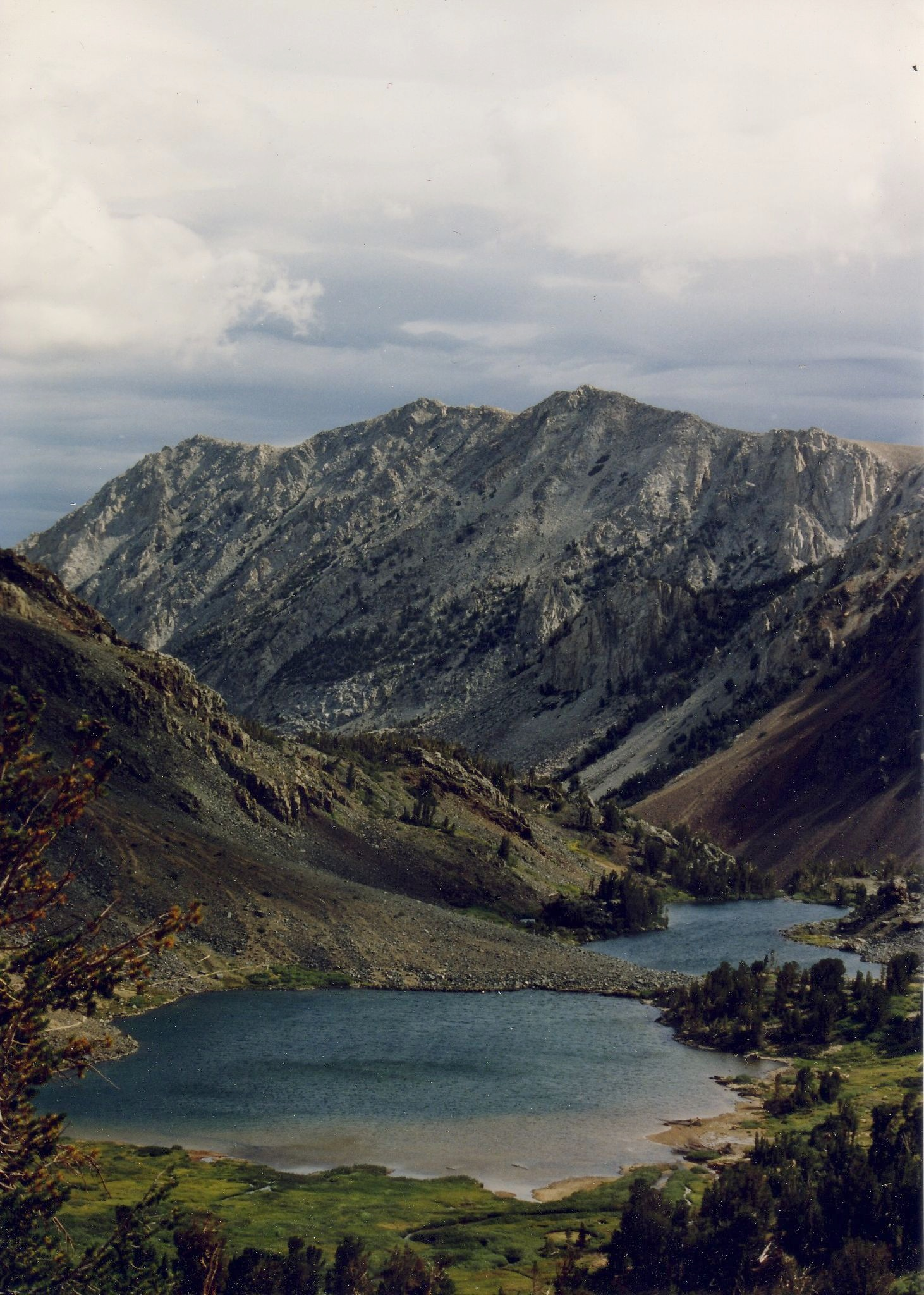
- Virginia Lakes from near the Sierra Crest
- Floor elevation: 9,819 ft (2,993 m)

Geography
- Coordinates: 38°02′53″N 119°15′55″W
- Rivers: Virginia Creek
- Interactive map of Virginia Lakes Basin

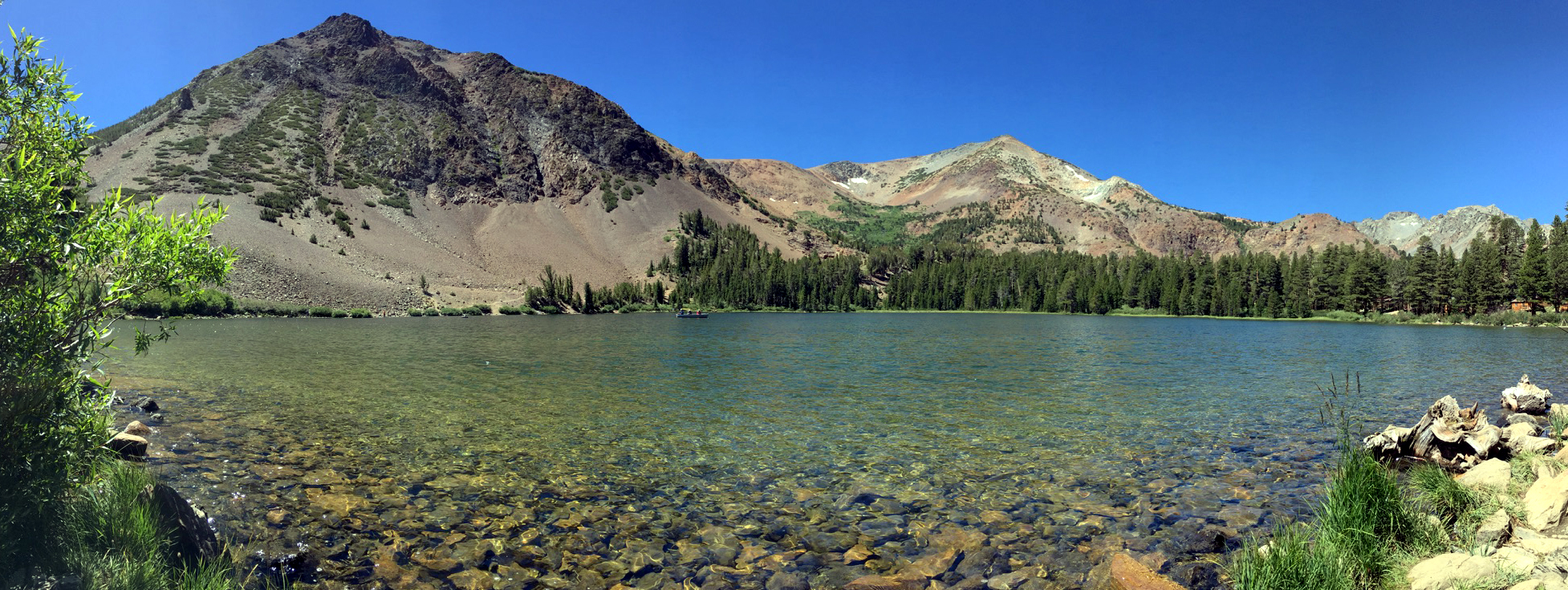
Black Mountain, over Upper Virginia Lake, Virginia Lakes, California

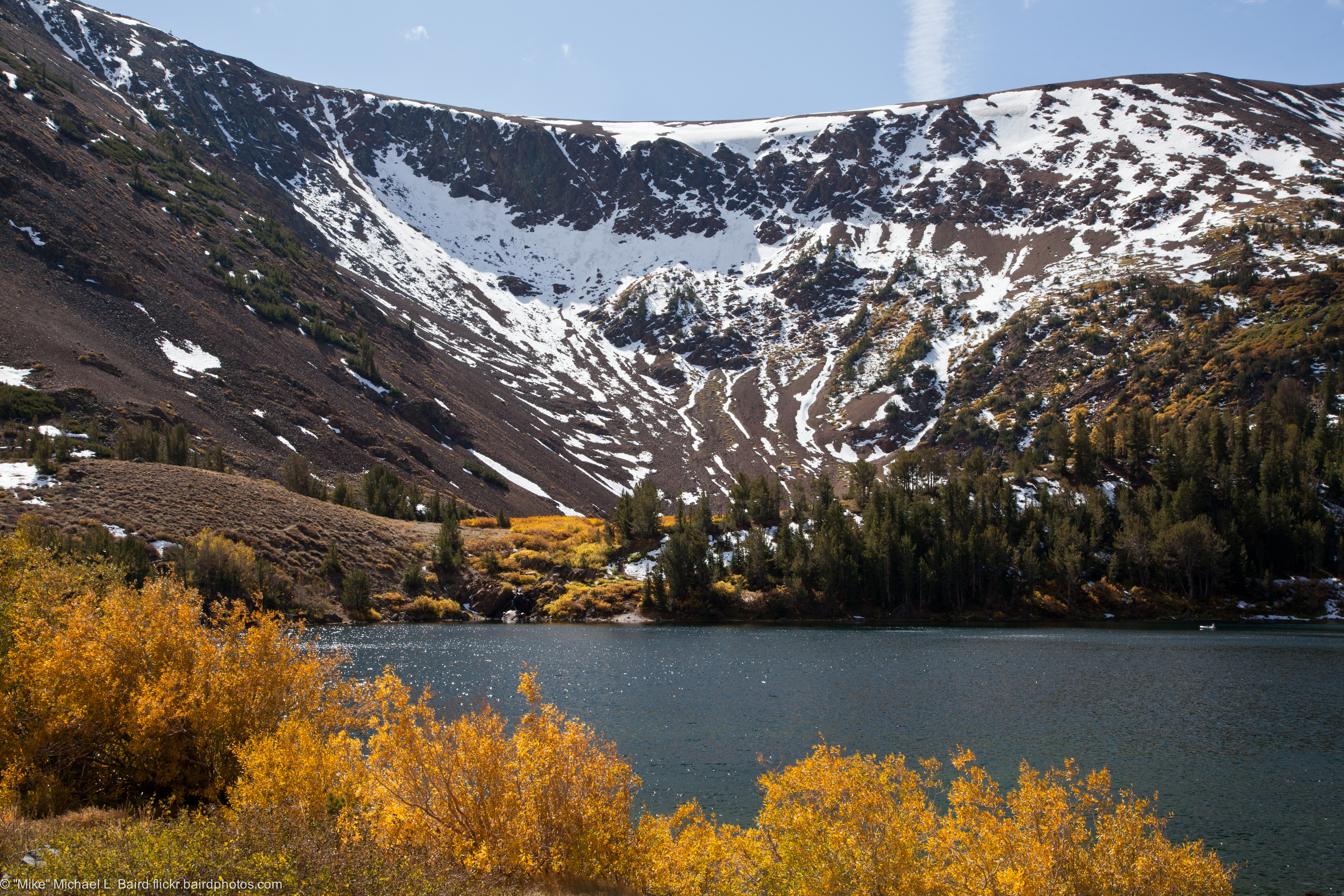
Upper Virginia Lake, Virginia Lakes

Virginia Lakes refers to a basin of lakes in the Eastern Sierra Nevada in Mono County, California. Virginia Lakes is located a few miles off U.S. Highway 395; the road to the lakes turns off U.S. 395 at Conway Summit, roughly halfway between Bridgeport, California, to the north and Lee Vining, California, to the south, in the Humboldt-Toiyabe National Forest. The name can also refer to two lakes within the basin: Little or Lower Virginia Lake and Upper or Big Virginia Lake. The area is part of the Virginia Lakes census-designated place.

== Features ==
Located in the Virginia Lakes area are a resort, pack station, and small community. Virginia Lakes is popular with anglers, hikers, and campers. A trail beginning at Virginia Lakes serves as a gateway to the Sierra backcountry and Yosemite National Park.

=== Lakes ===
The bodies of water in the Virginia Lakes Basin include Trumbull Lake, Red Lake, Blue Lake, Upper Virginia Lake, Little Virginia Lake, Cooney Lake, Moat Lake, and the Frog Lakes. These are all connected by the perennial Virginia Creek (not navigable).

== See also ==
- List of lakes in California
