= Hoover Wilderness =

Protected wilderness area in California, United States

- IUCN category Ib (wilderness area)
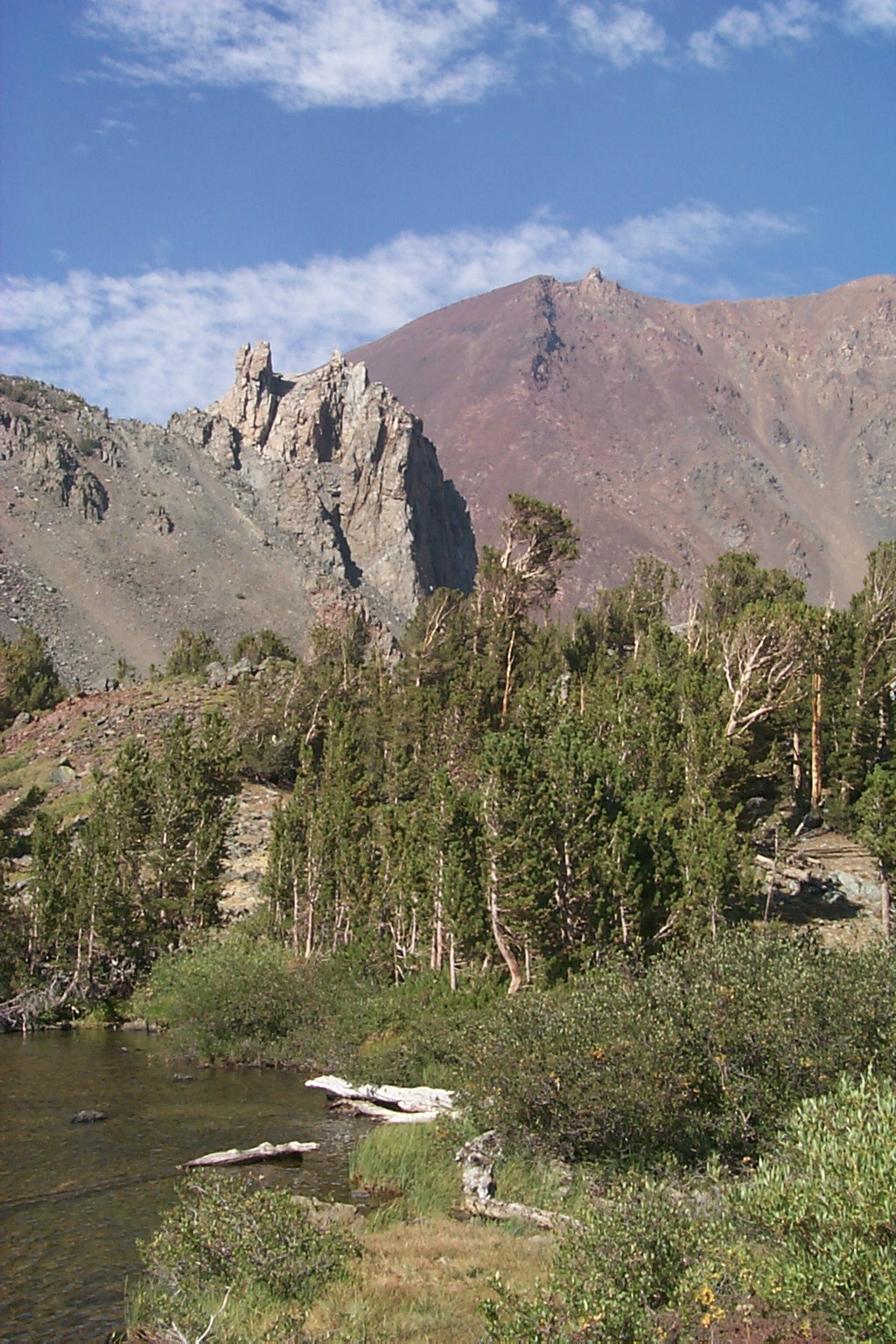
- Dunderberg Peak as seen from the Virginia Lakes Basin

- Location within California Location within the United States
- Interactive map of Hoover Wilderness
- Location: Mono County, California, United States
- Nearest city: Bridgeport, CA
- Coordinates: 38°6′47″N 119°22′37″W
- Area: 128,221 acres (518.89 km^{2})
- Established: January 1, 1964
- Governing body: U.S. Forest Service

The Hoover Wilderness is a wilderness area in the Inyo and Humboldt-Toiyabe National Forests. It lies to the east of the crest of the central Sierra Nevada in California, to the north and east of Yosemite National Park - a long strip stretching nearly to Sonora Pass on the north and Tioga Pass on the south.

The headwaters of the Walker River are in the Hoover Wilderness. Many trails lead into it from the north and east, from Leavitt Meadow (off the Sonora Pass road), Buckeye Creek, Green Creek, Virginia Lakes, Lundy Lake, and Saddlebag Lake (off the Tioga Pass road).

The Hoover Wilderness was originally designated as a Primitive Area by the Forest Service in 1931. It was named in honor of President Herbert Hoover. In 1956, it was designated as a Wild Area and became a Wilderness Area when the 1964 Wilderness Act was passed. It was significantly expanded to its present size in 2009.

The Hoover Wilderness was the setting of Camping Adventure, a children's book published in 1976 by the National Geographic Society as part of its "Books for Young Explorers" series.

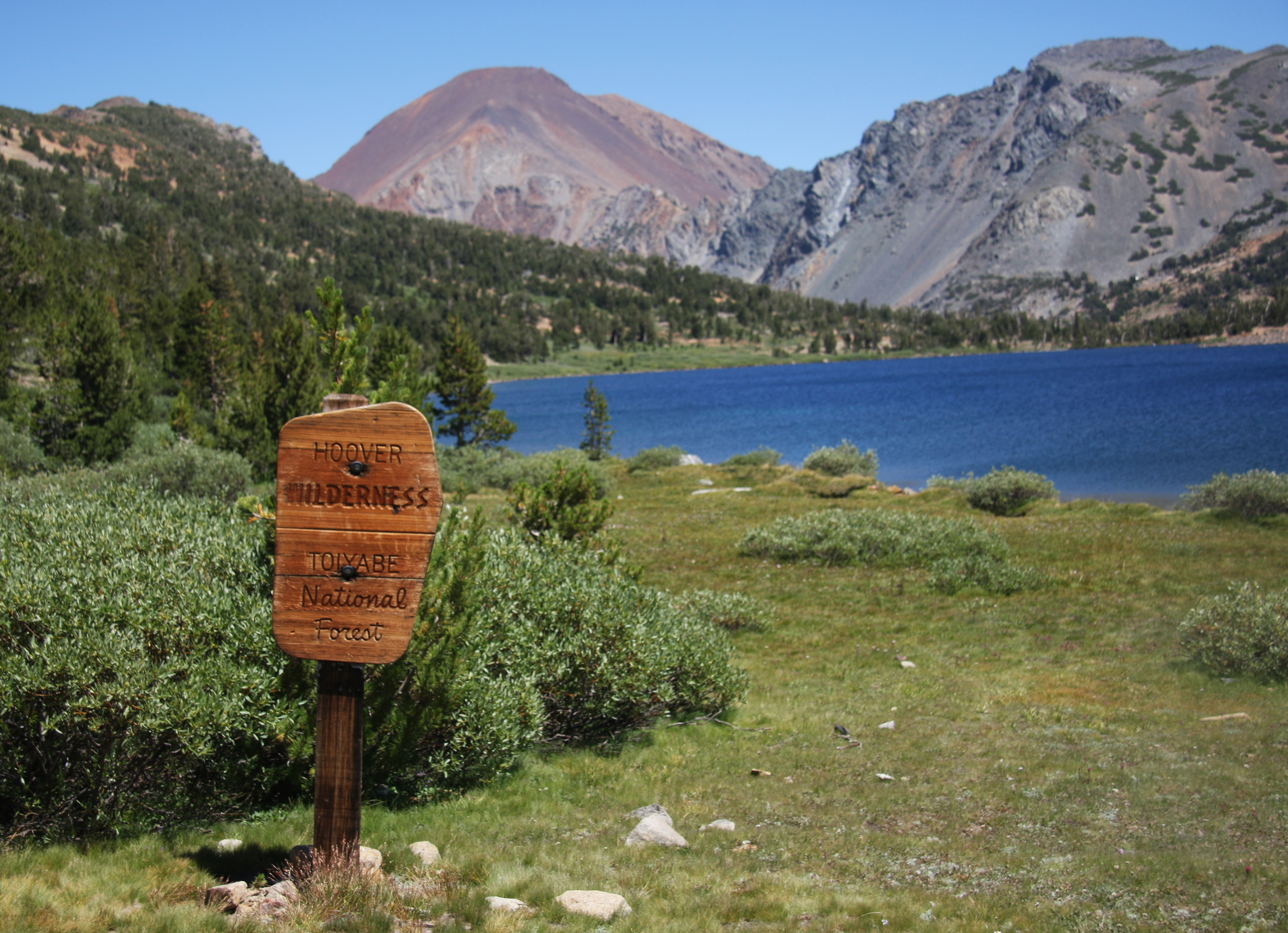
Summit Lake at the Sierra Crest

== Places ==
Notable locations in the Hoover Wilderness include:

- Twenty Lakes Basin, above Saddlebag Lake 37°59′N 119°18′W
- Virginia Lakes Basin 38°3′N 119°16.5′W
- The Sawtooth Ridge and Matterhorn Peak 38°6′N 119°24′W
