= Dunderberg Peak =

Mountain in California

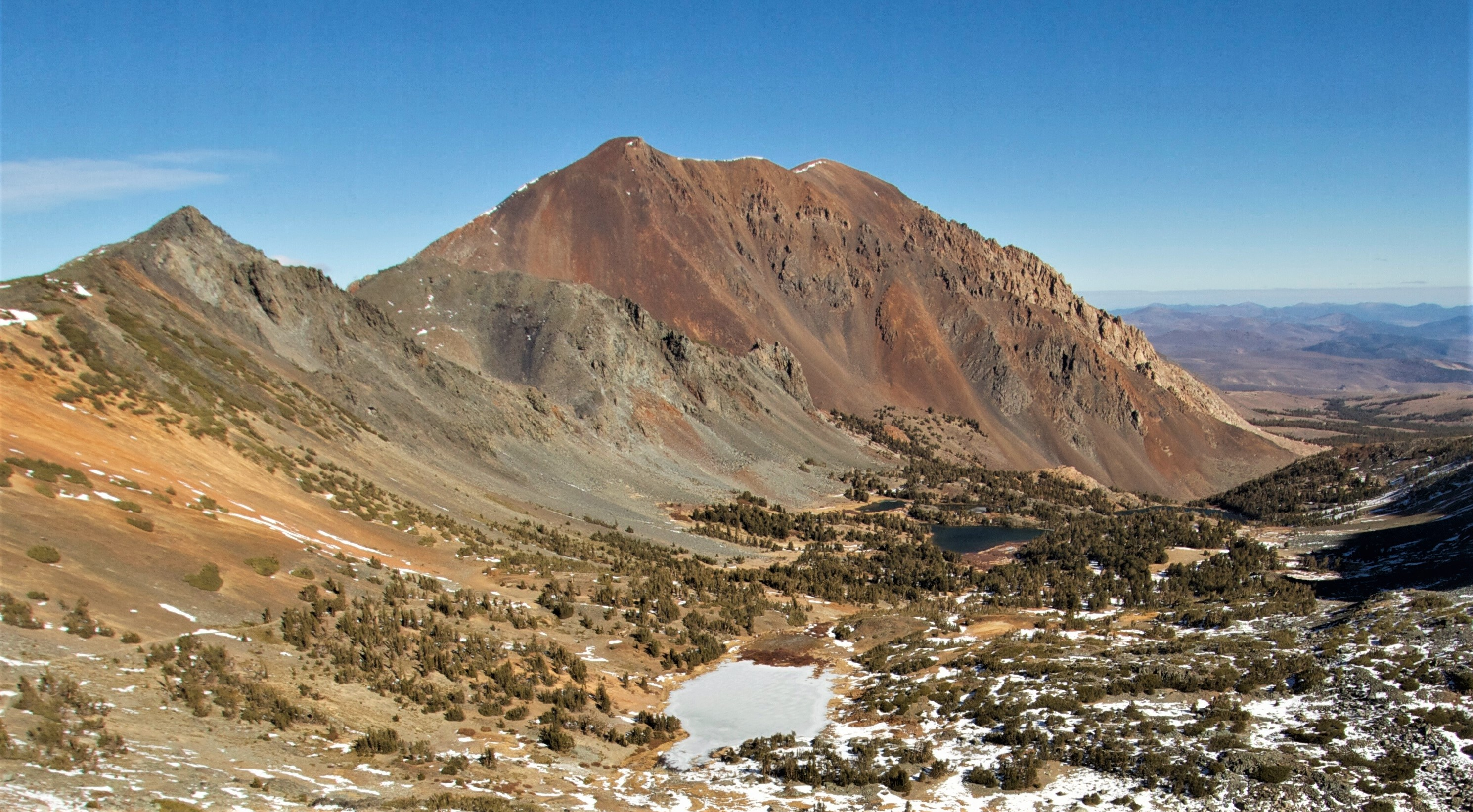
- Dunderberg Peak from the Southwest

Highest point
- Elevation: 12,379 ft (3,773 m) NAVD 88
- Prominence: 1,334 ft (407 m)
- Listing: Sierra Peaks Section
- Coordinates: 38°03′53″N 119°16′28″W

Geography
- Location within California Location within the United States
- Location: Mono County, California, U.S.
- Parent range: Sierra Nevada
- Topo map: USGS Dunderberg Peak

Climbing
- First ascent: 1878 by Lt. M. M. Macomb and party of the Wheeler Survey
- Easiest route: Hike (class 1-2)

Dunderberg Peak is located east of the Sierra Nevada crest near the divide between the Mono Basin and East Walker River basin (Conway Summit) in Mono County, in eastern California in the southwestern United States. The peak is in the Hoover Wilderness and is the highest point in Humboldt-Toiyabe National Forest.

== History ==
Dunderberg Peak, originally named Castle Peak, was renamed by a party of the Wheeler Survey after the mines upon its northerly slope in 1878.

== Climate ==
Dunderberg Peak is located in an alpine climate zone. Most weather fronts originate in the Pacific Ocean, and travel east toward the Sierra Nevada mountains. As fronts approach, they are forced upward by the peaks (orographic lift), causing moisture in the form of rain or snowfall to drop onto the range.

== See also ==
- Dunderberg Mill, California, a ghost town located 3 miles (4.8 km) north-northeast of the summit.
- Virginia Peak, nearby

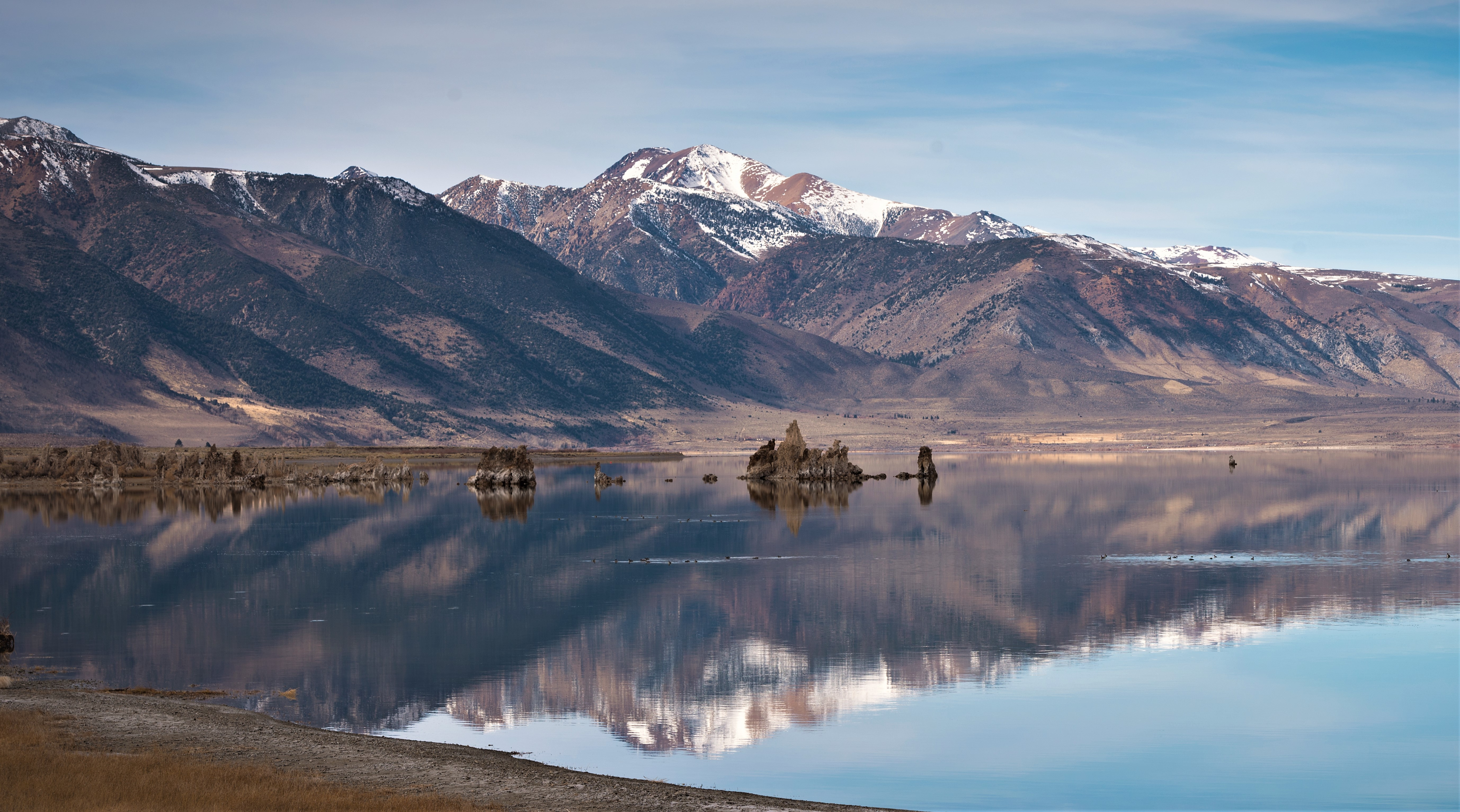
Dunderberg Peak reflected in Mono Lake
