= Billy Masters =

Billy Masters may refer to:

- Billy Masters (columnist) (born 1969), American gossip columnist
- Billy Masters (American football) (born 1944), American football tight end
- Billy Rush Masters (1950–1981), American composer and rock guitarist
