= List of gay, lesbian or bisexual people: M =

This is a partial list of notable people who were or are gay men, lesbian or bisexual.

The historical concept and definition of sexual orientation varies and has changed greatly over time; for example the general term "gay" wasn't used to describe sexual orientation until the mid 20th century. A number of different classification schemes have been used to describe sexual orientation since the mid-19th century, and scholars have often defined the term "sexual orientation" in divergent ways. Indeed, several studies have found that much of the research about sexual orientation has failed to define the term at all, making it difficult to reconcile the results of different studies. However, most definitions include a psychological component (such as the direction of an individual's erotic desire) and/or a behavioural component (which focuses on the sex of the individual's sexual partner/s). Some prefer to simply follow an individual's self-definition or identity.

The high prevalence of people from the West on this list may be due to societal attitudes towards homosexuality. The Pew Research Center's 2013 Global Attitudes Survey found that there is "greater acceptance in more secular and affluent countries", with "publics in 39 countries [having] broad acceptance of homosexuality in North America, the European Union, and much of Latin America, but equally widespread rejection in predominantly Muslim nations and in Africa, as well as in parts of Asia and in Russia. Opinion about the acceptability of homosexuality is divided in Israel, Poland and Bolivia". As of 2013, Americans were divided – a majority (60 percent) believed homosexuality should be accepted, while 33 percent disagreed.

== M ==
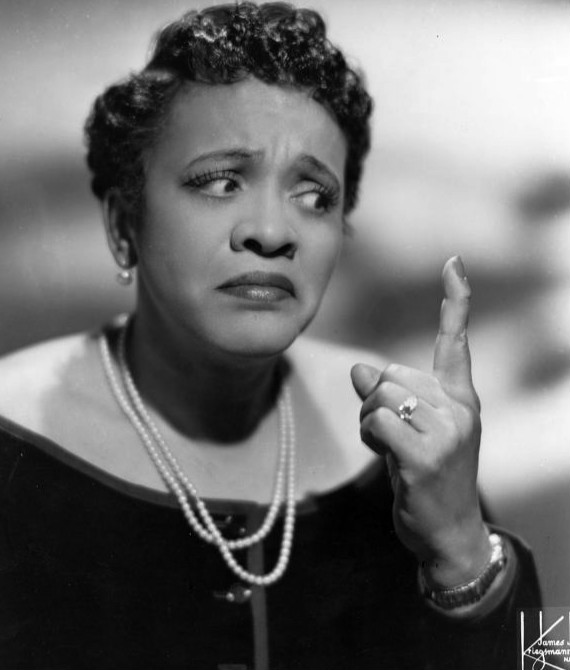
Comedian and actor Moms Mabley

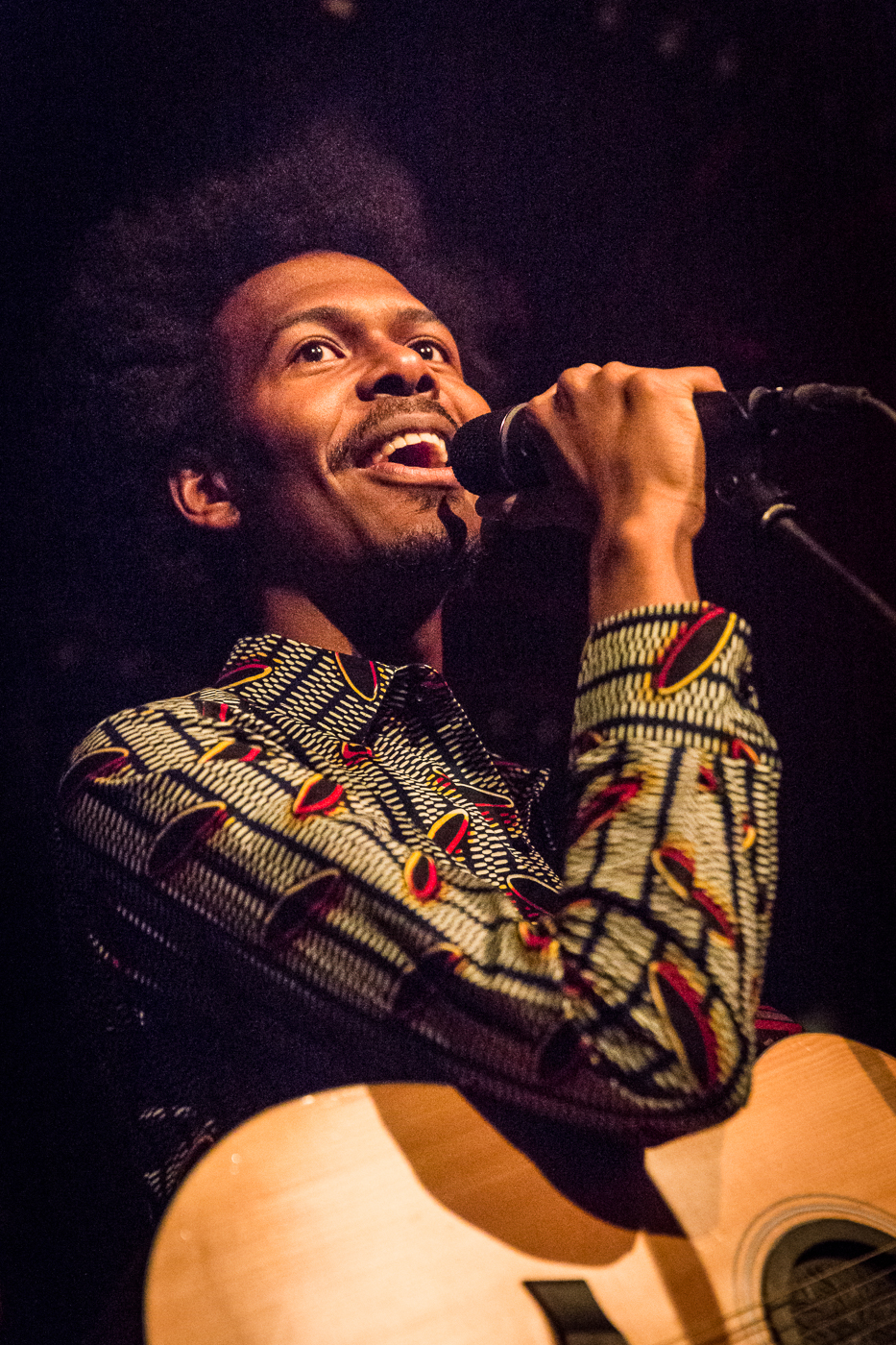
Singer Jeangu Macrooy

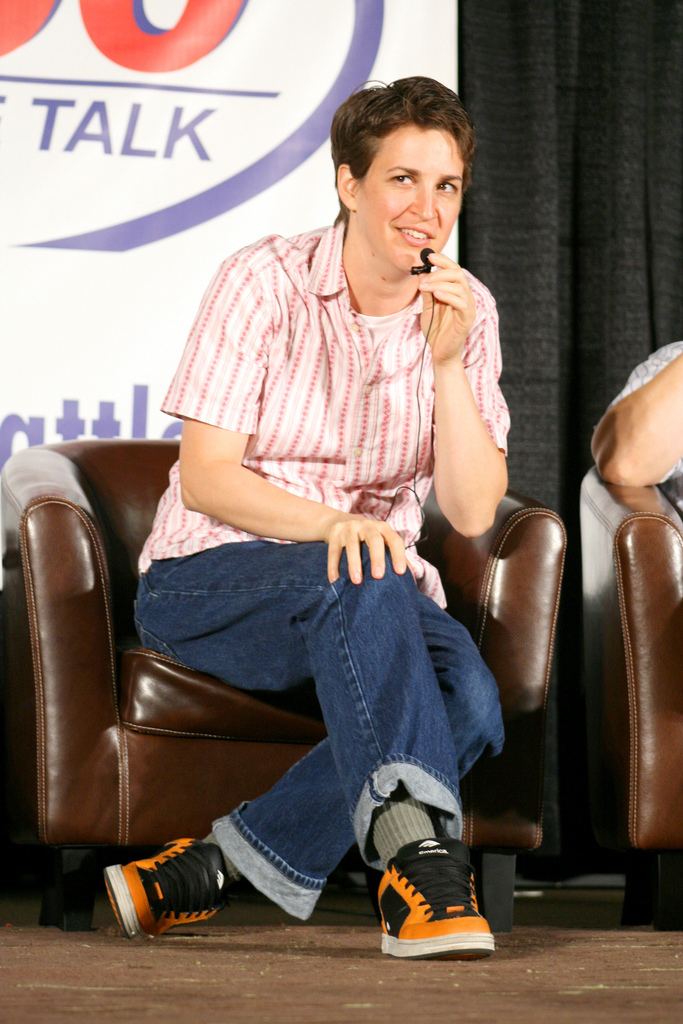
Political commentator and TV host Rachel Maddow

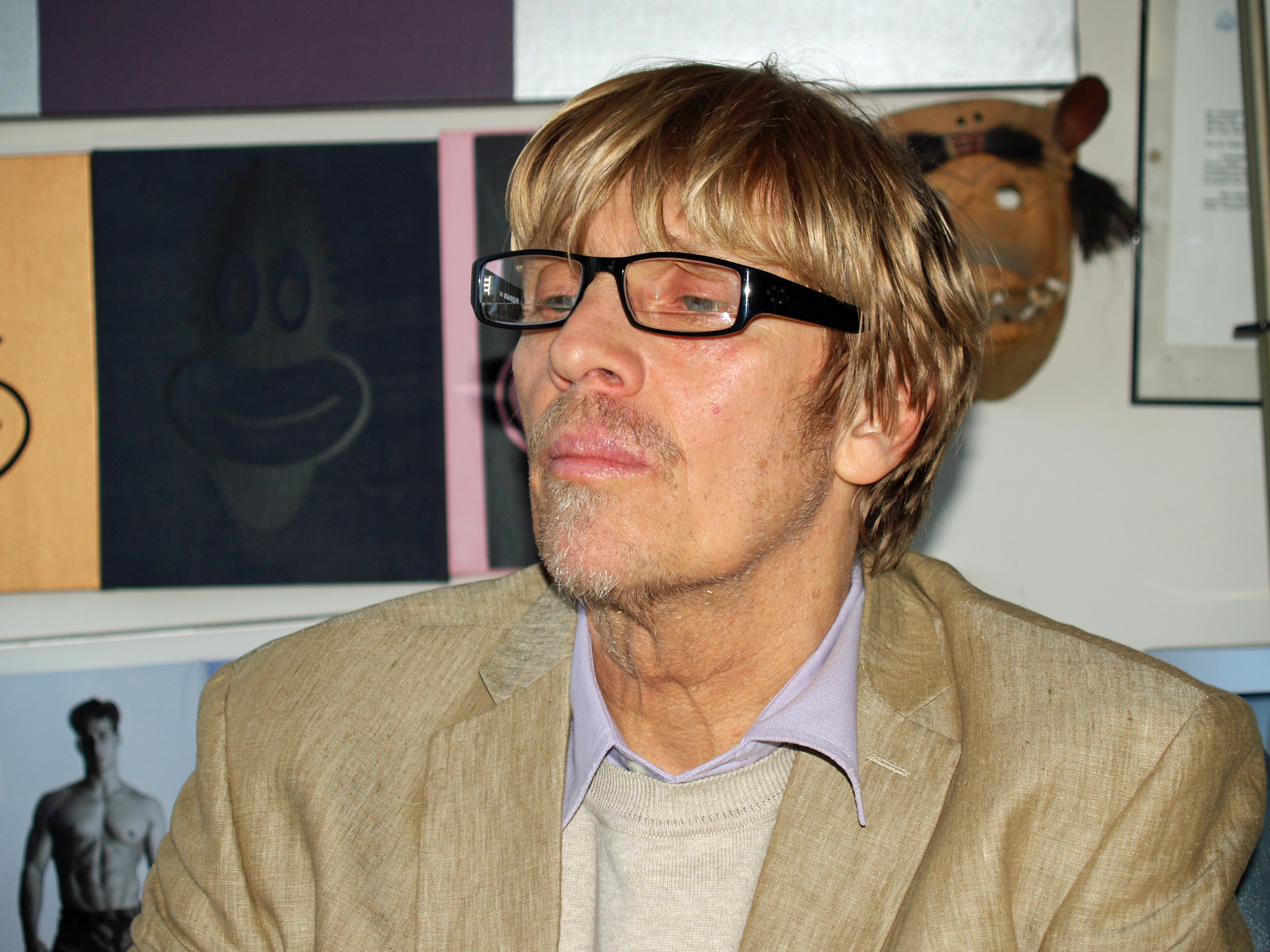
Photographer and artist Christopher Makos

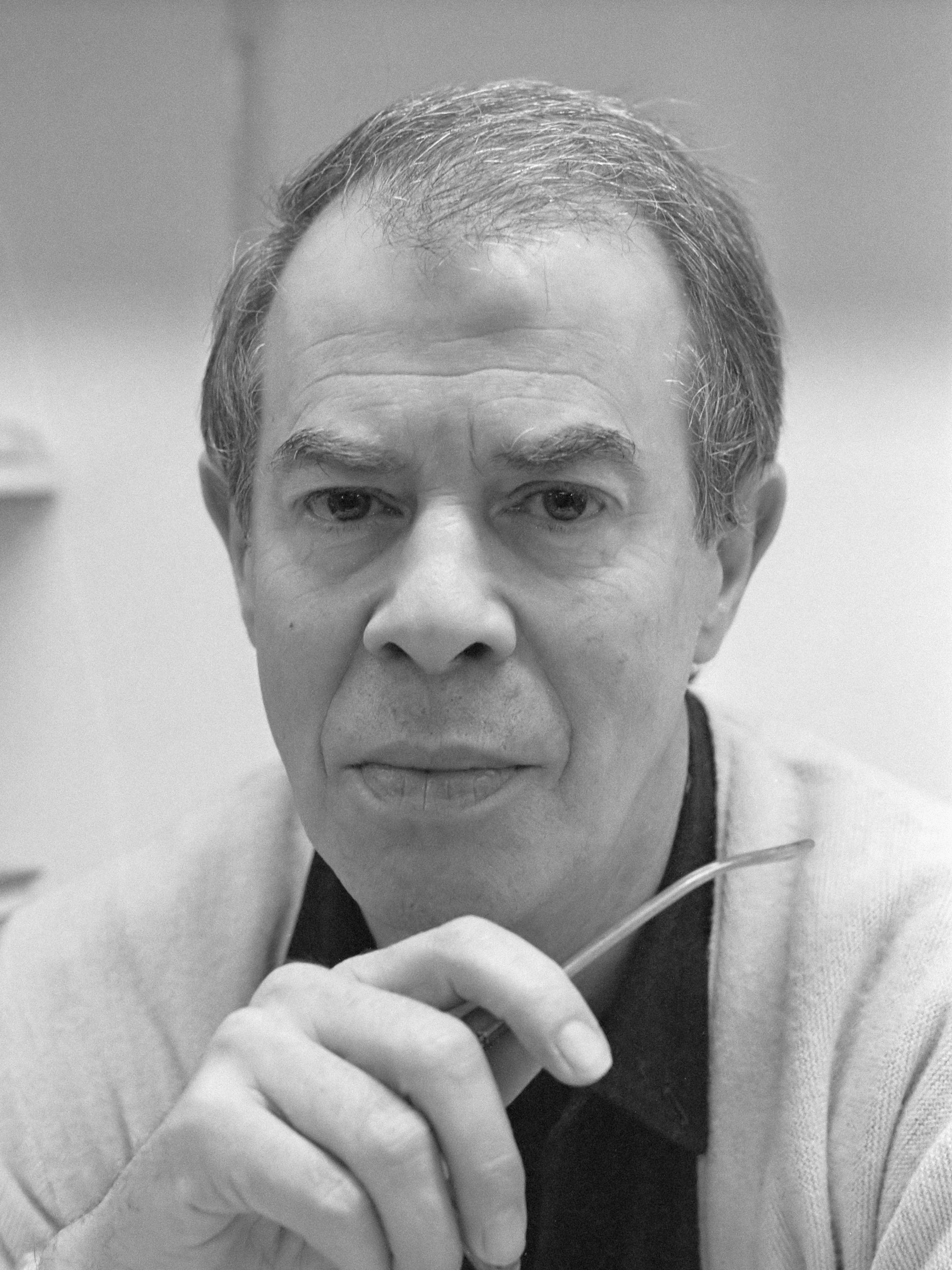
Ballet dancer, choreographer and photographer Hans van Manen

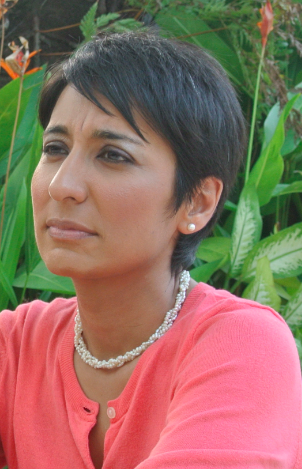
Author, educator and activist Irshad Manji

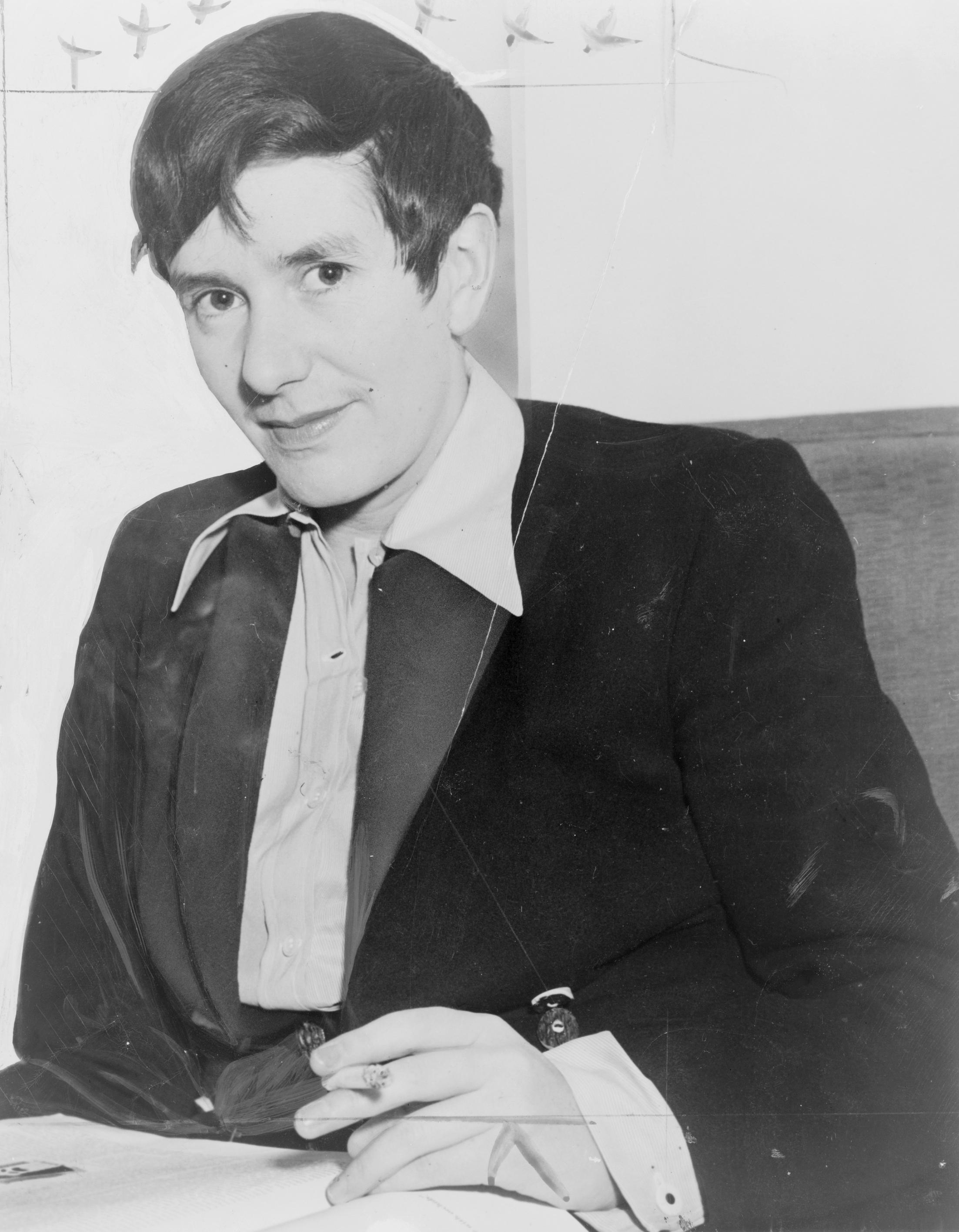
Writer and actor Erika Mann

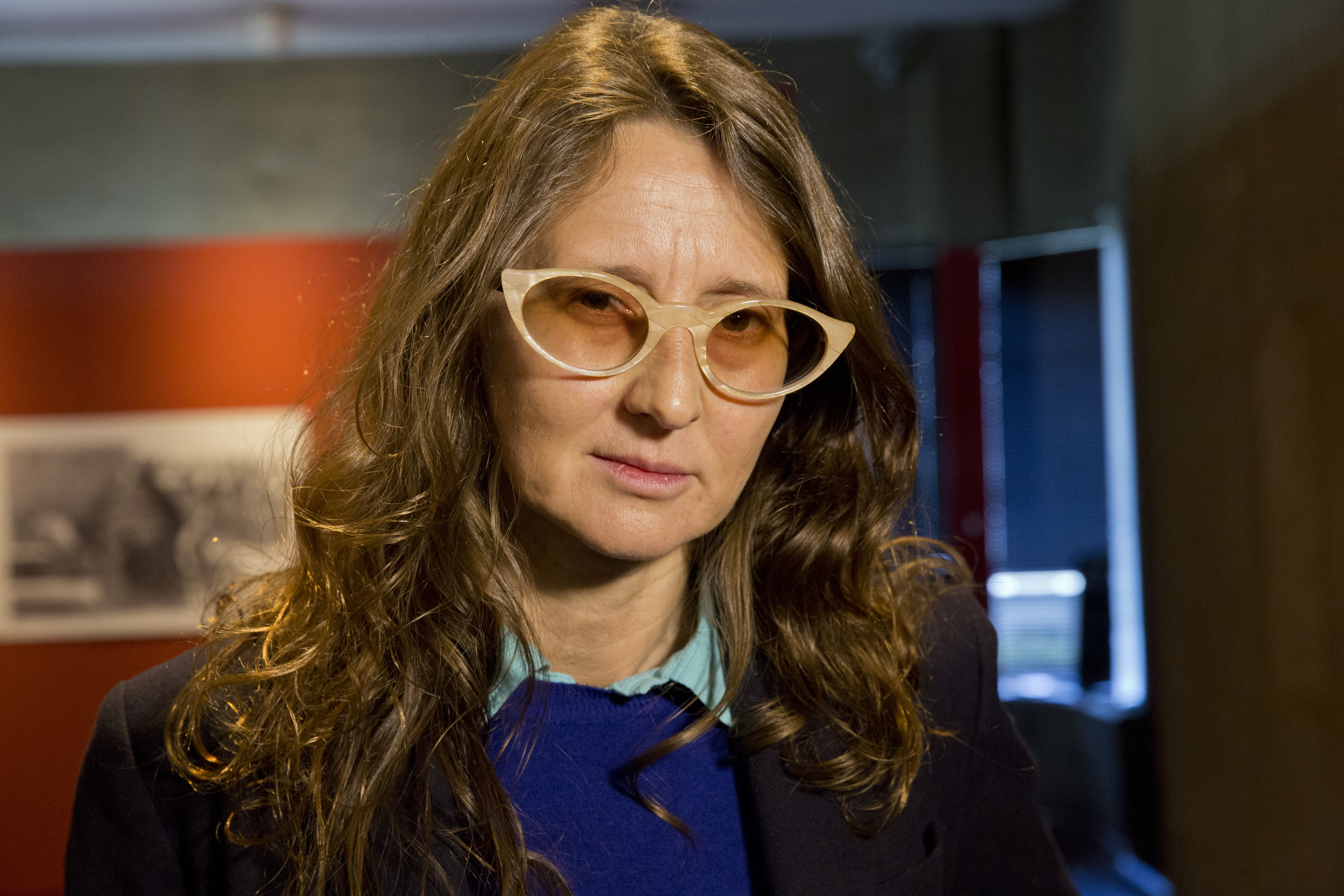
Filmmaker Lucrecia Martel

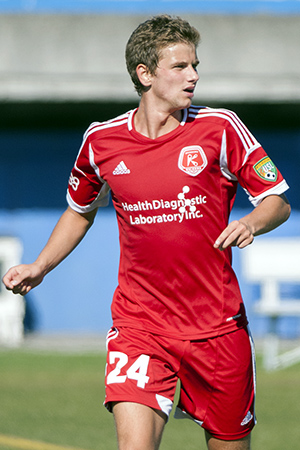
Soccer player Collin Martin

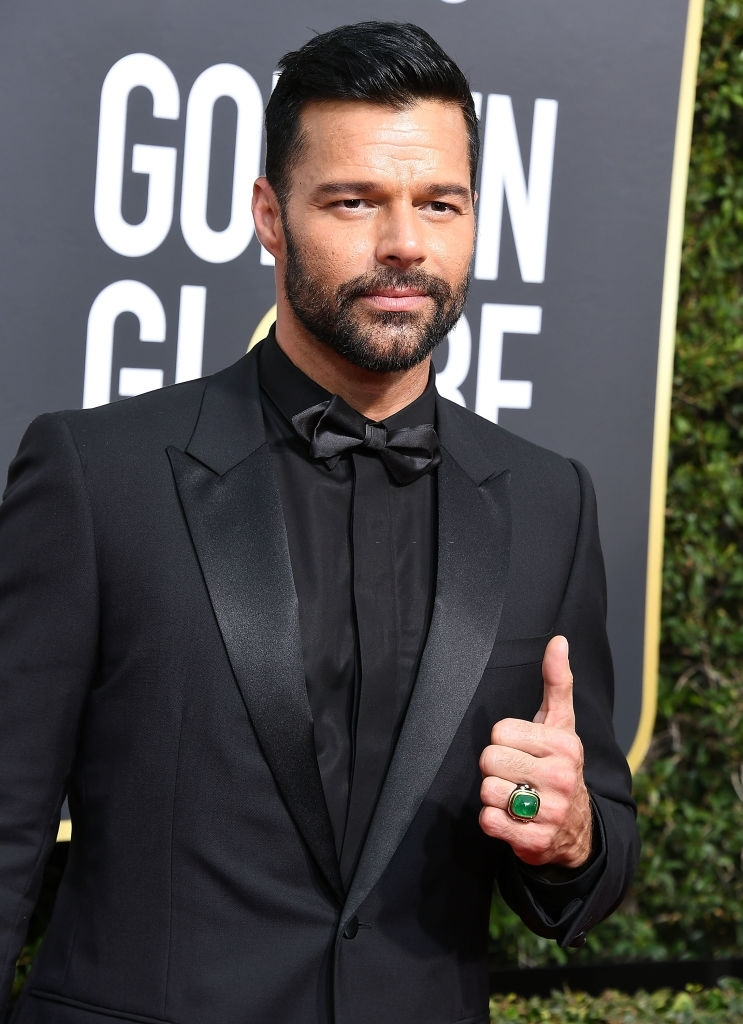
Singer Ricky Martin

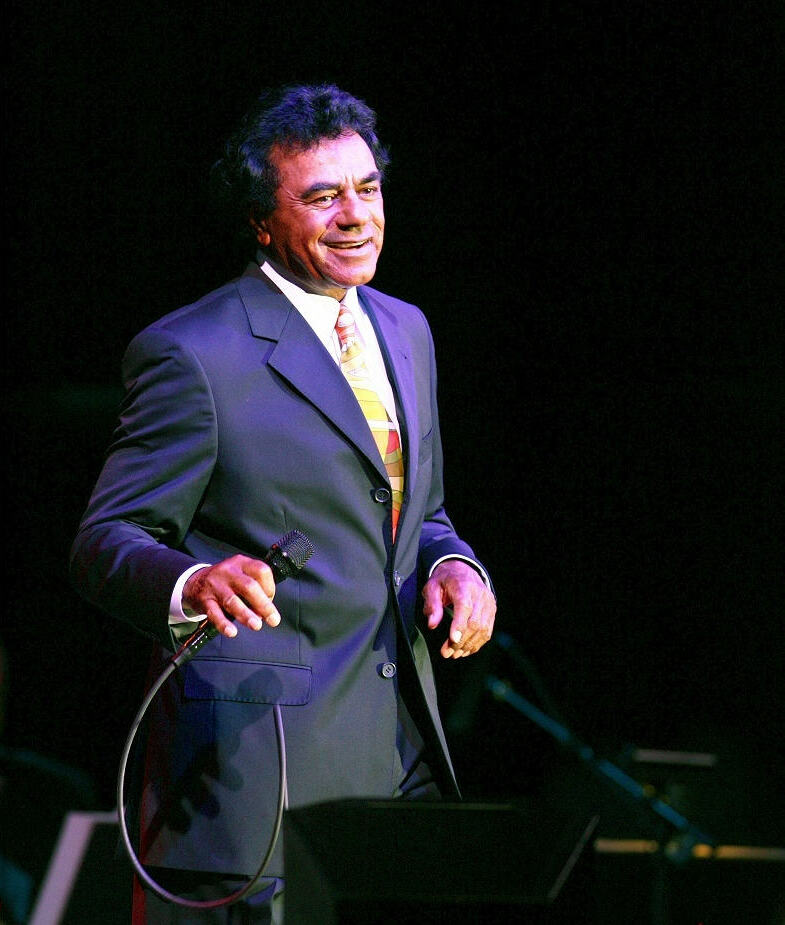
Pop musician Johnny Mathis

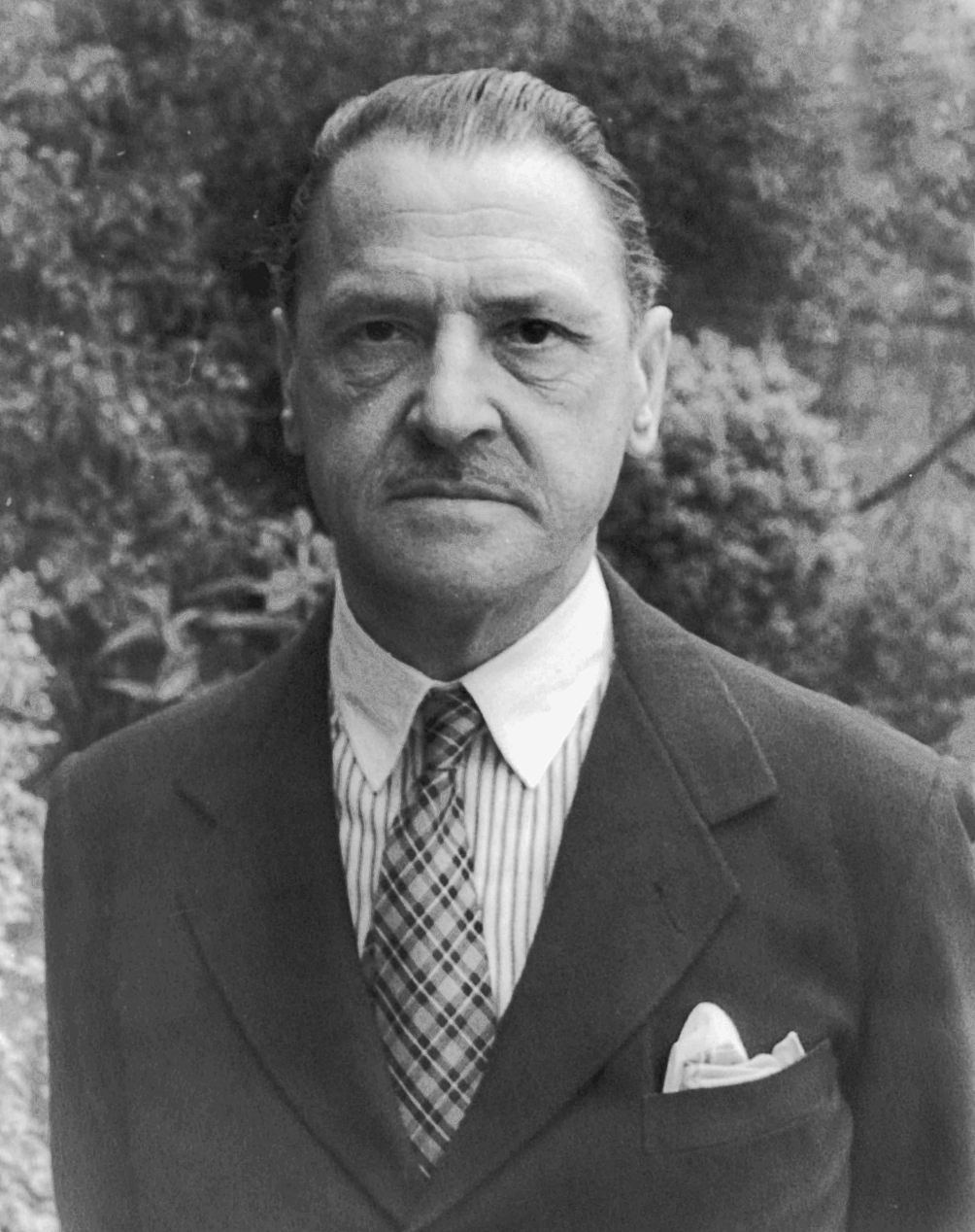
Writer W. Somerset Maugham

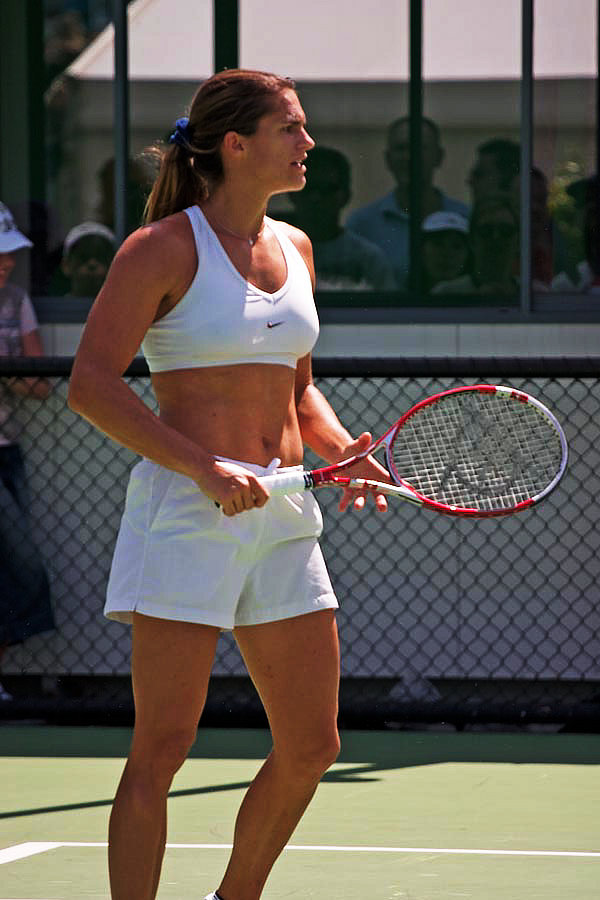
Tennis player Amélie Mauresmo

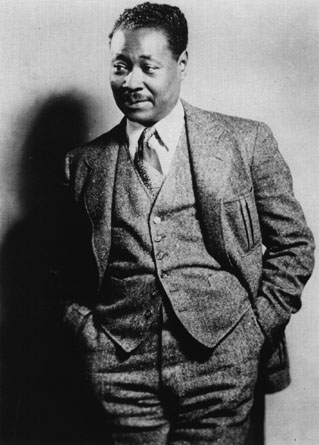
Writer Claude McKay

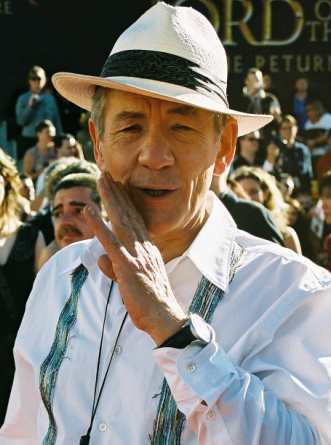
Actor and gay rights campaigner Sir Ian McKellen

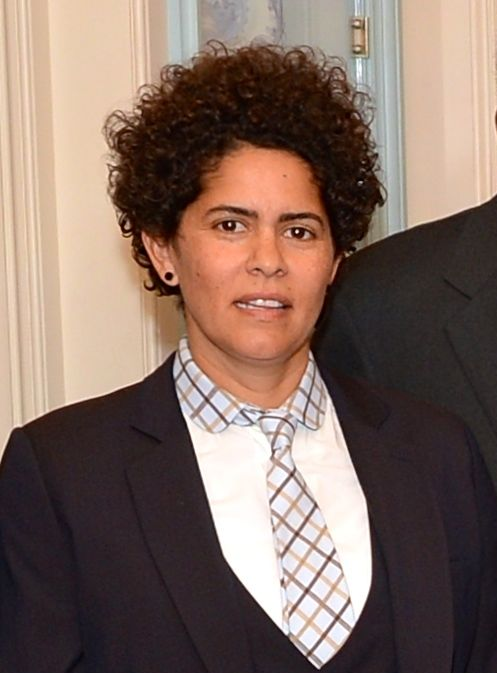
Artist Julie Mehretu

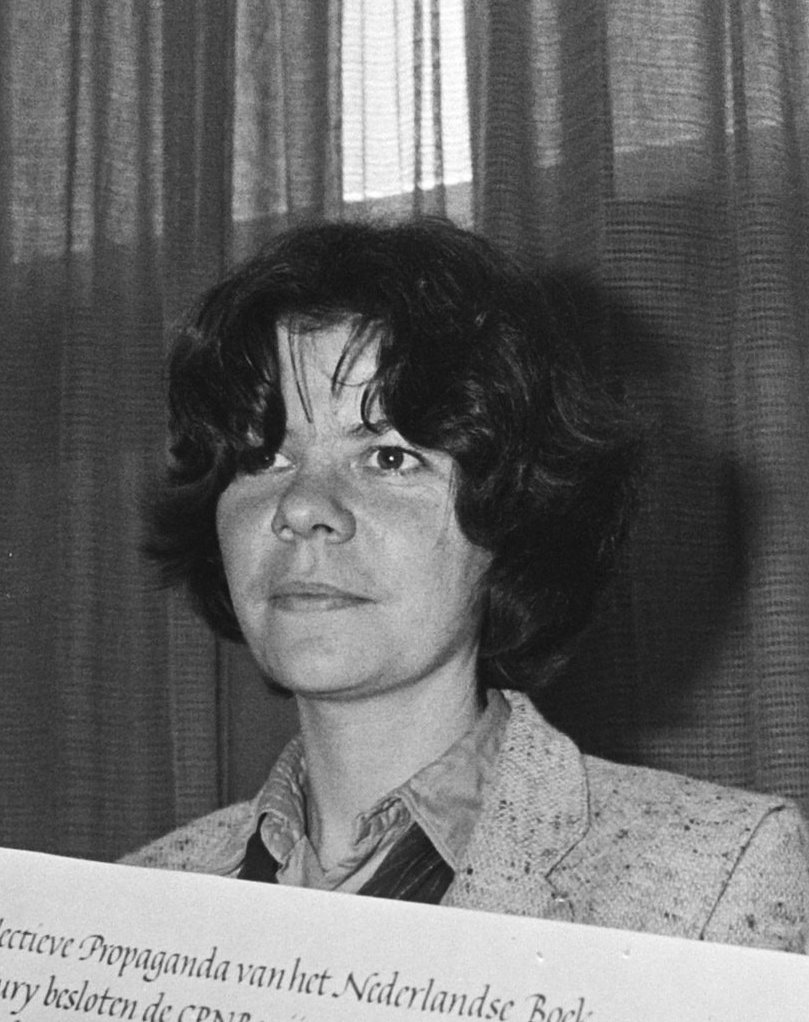
Novelist Doeschka Meijsing

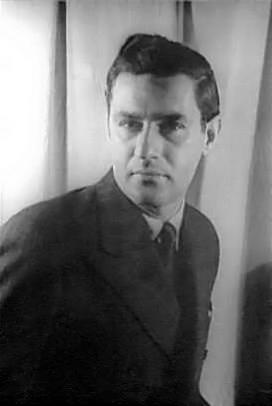
Classical composer Gian Carlo Menotti

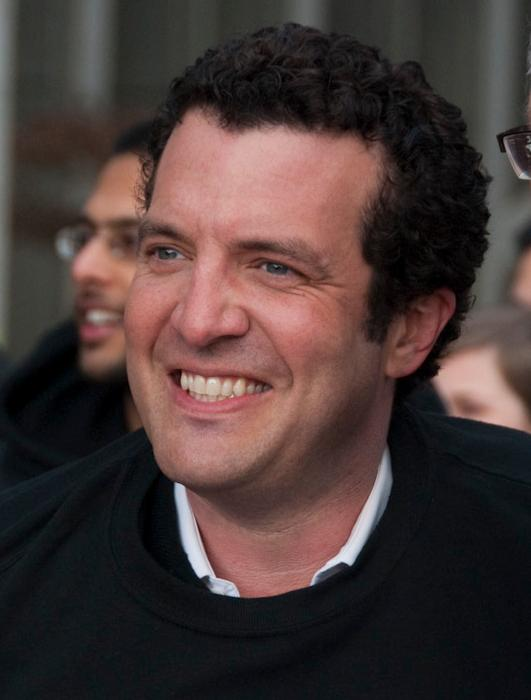
Comedian Rick Mercer

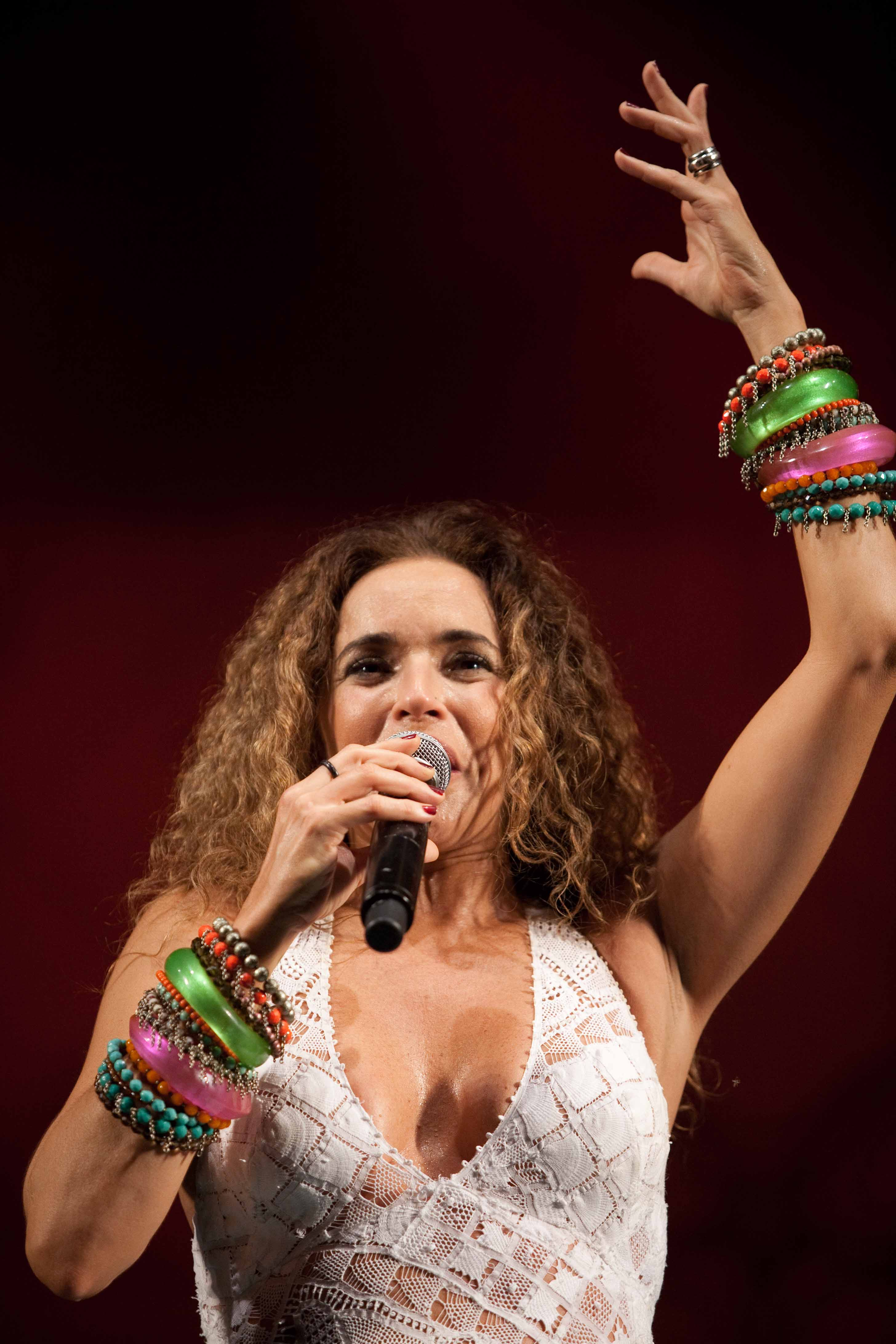
Singer-songwriter Daniela Mercury

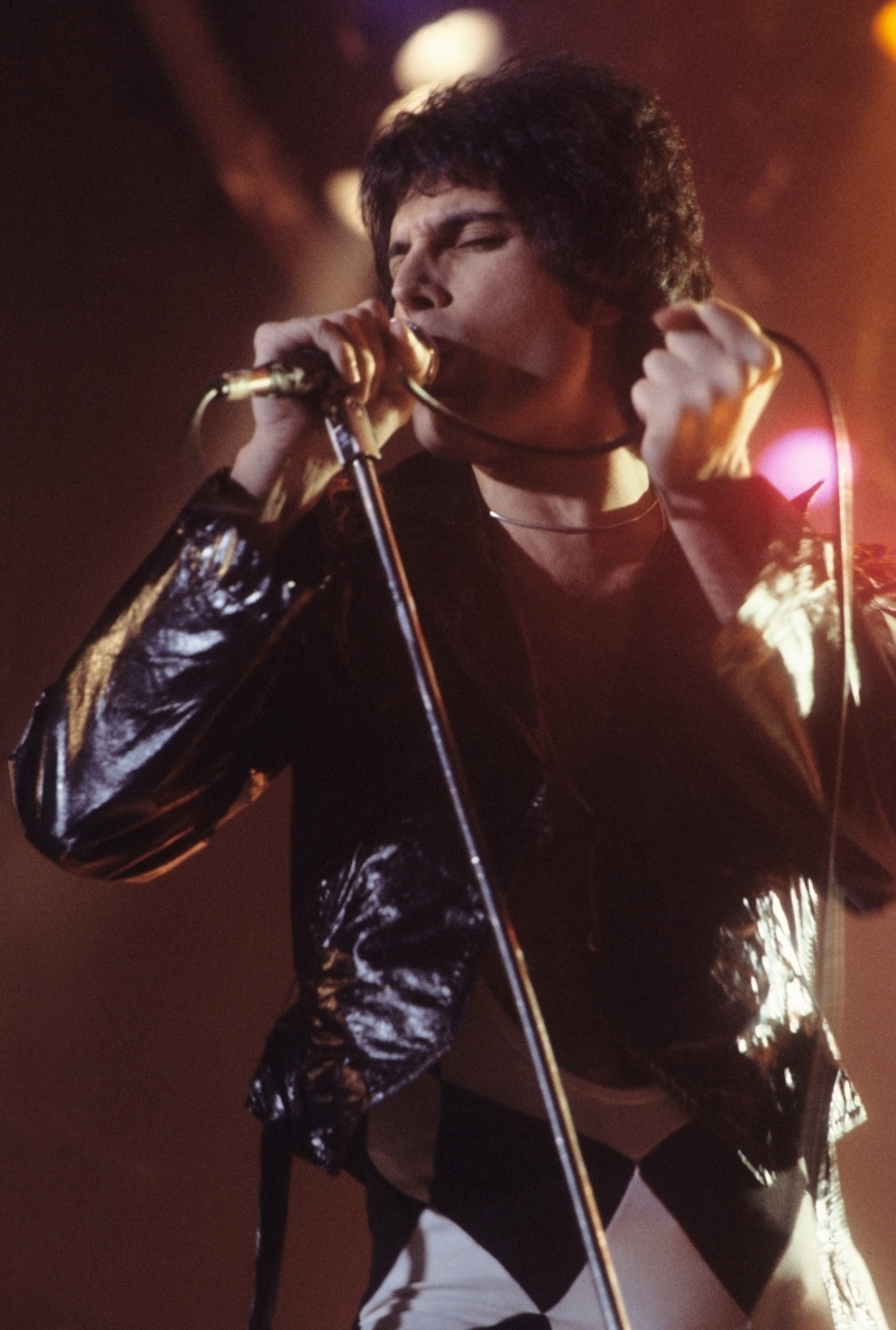
Rock musician Freddie Mercury

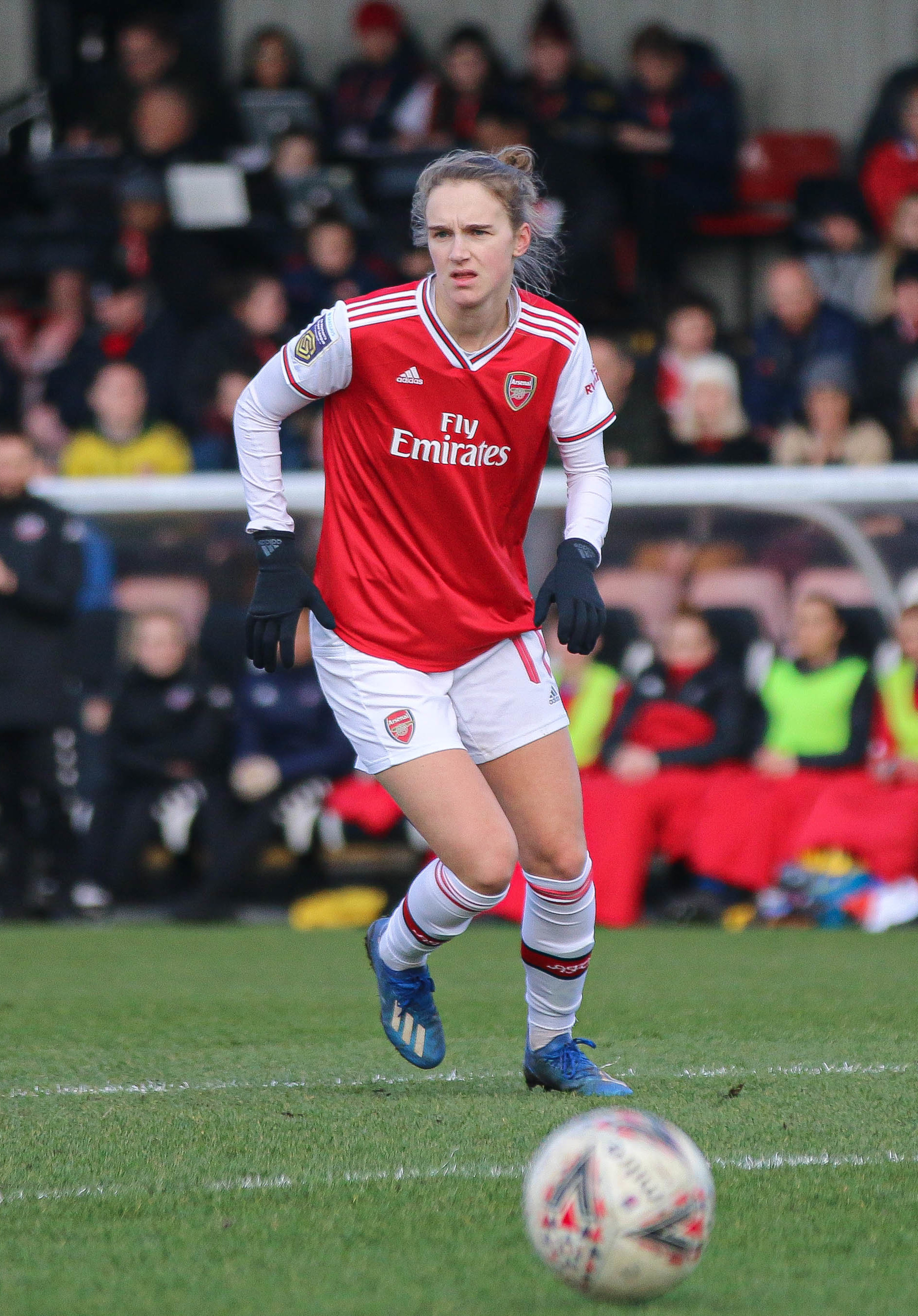
Footballer Vivianne Miedema

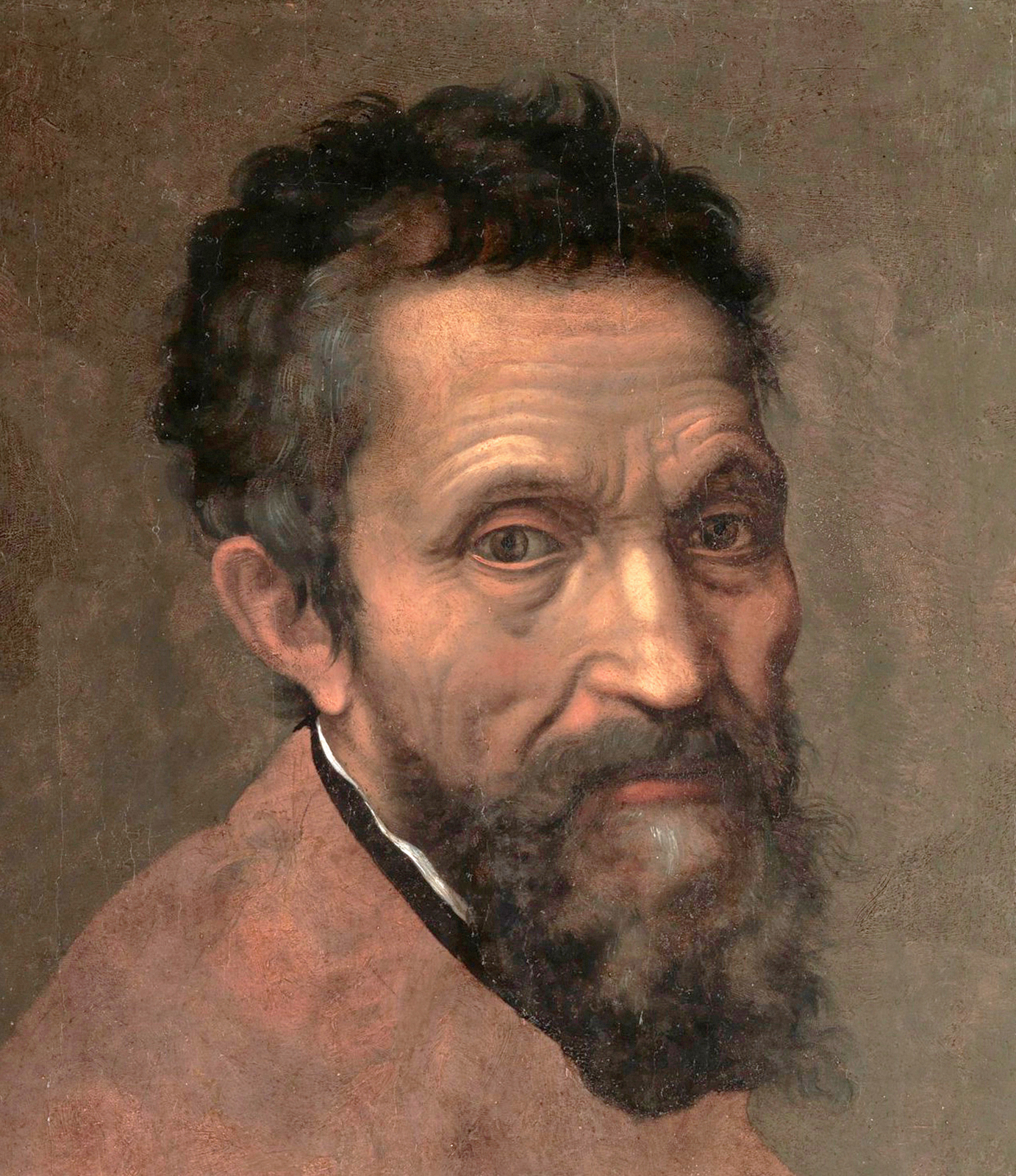
Sculptor, painter, architect, and poet Michelangelo

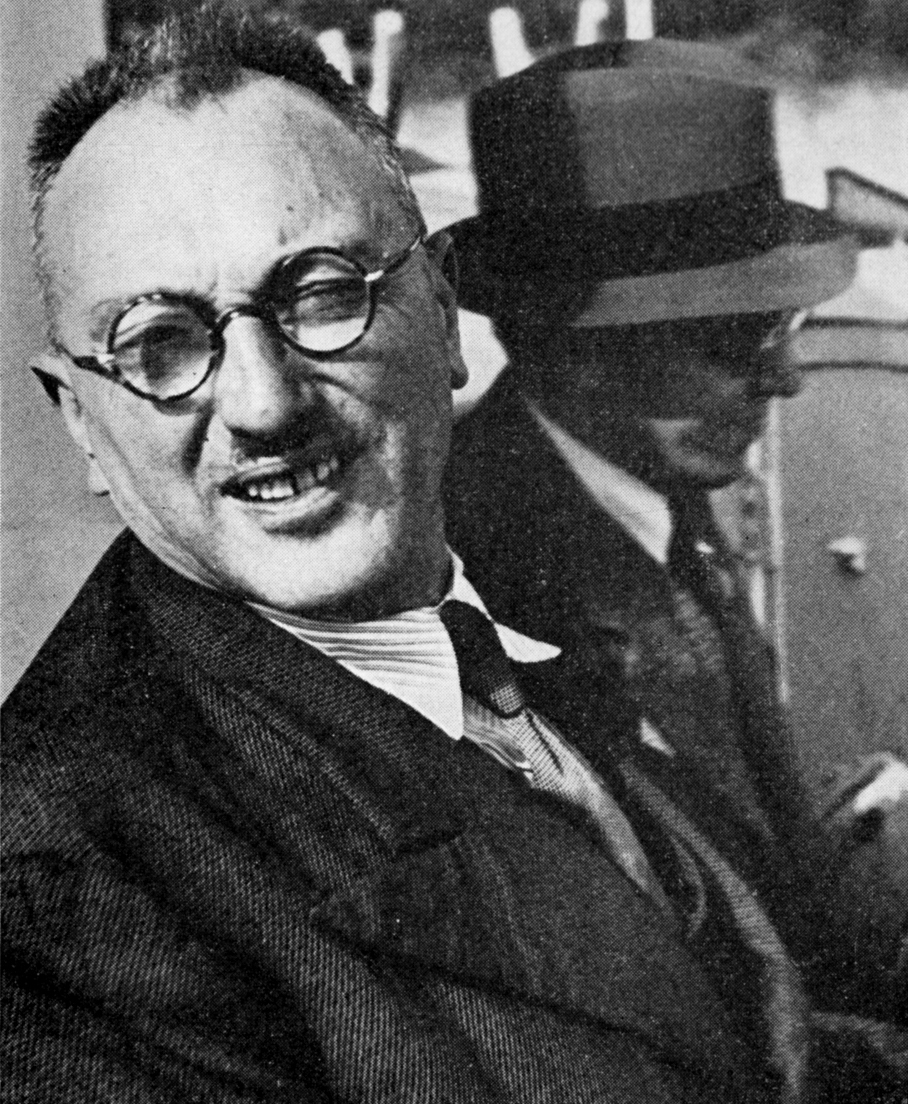
Science historian Aldo Mieli

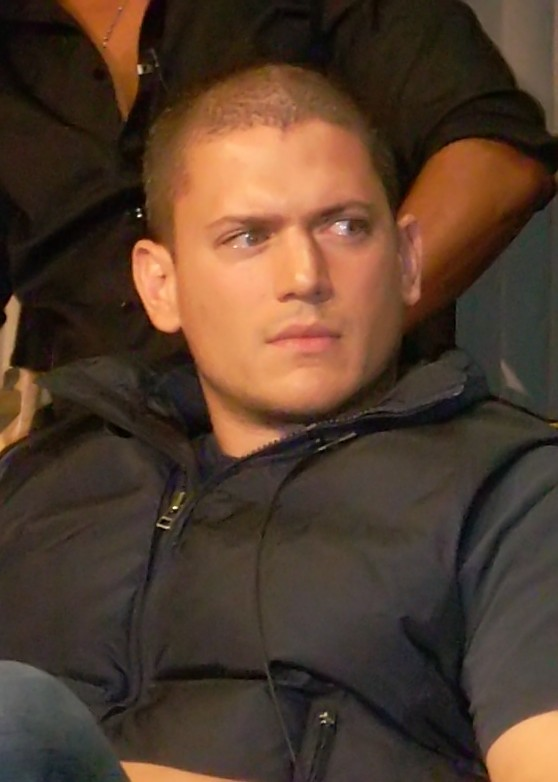
Actor Wentworth Miller

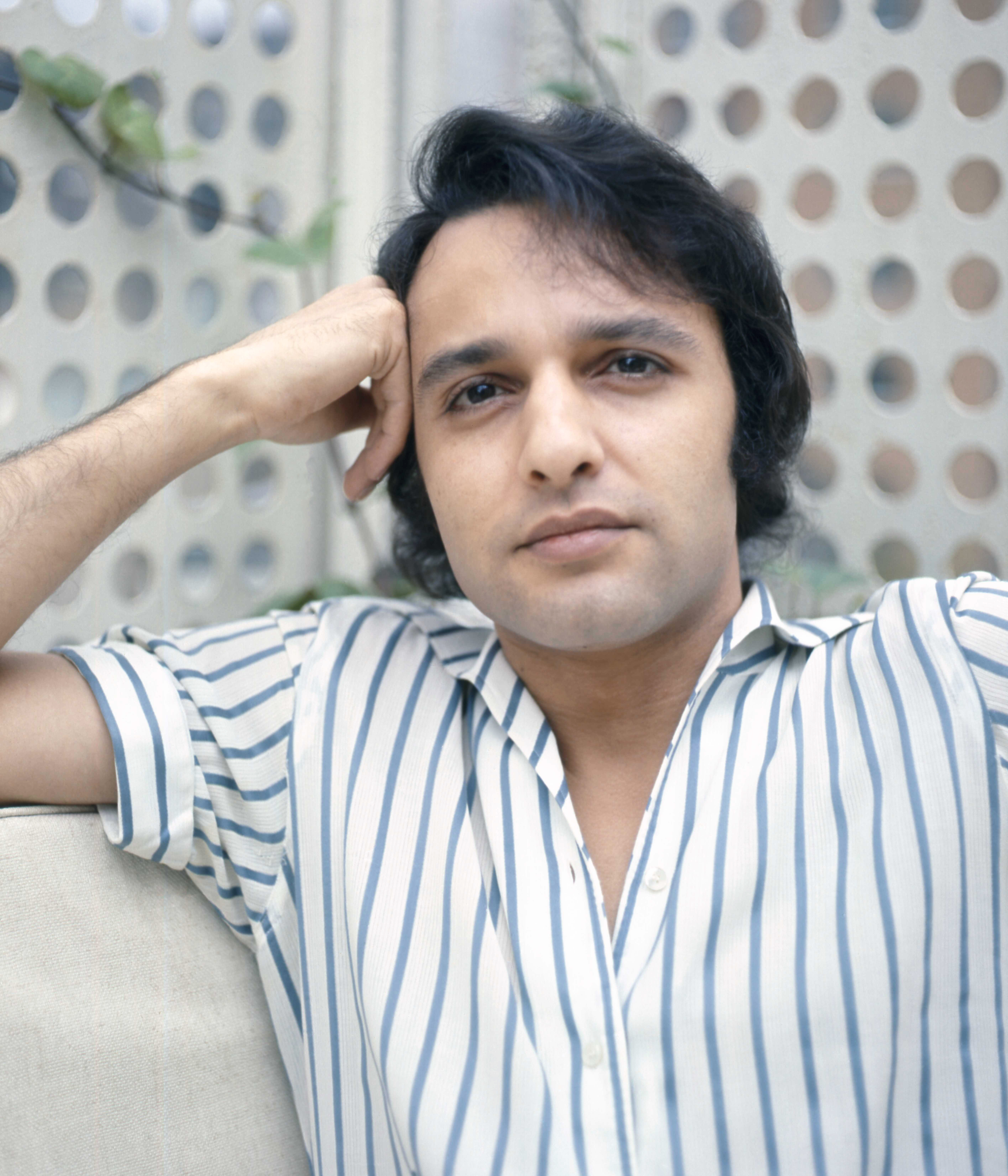
Actor Sal Mineo

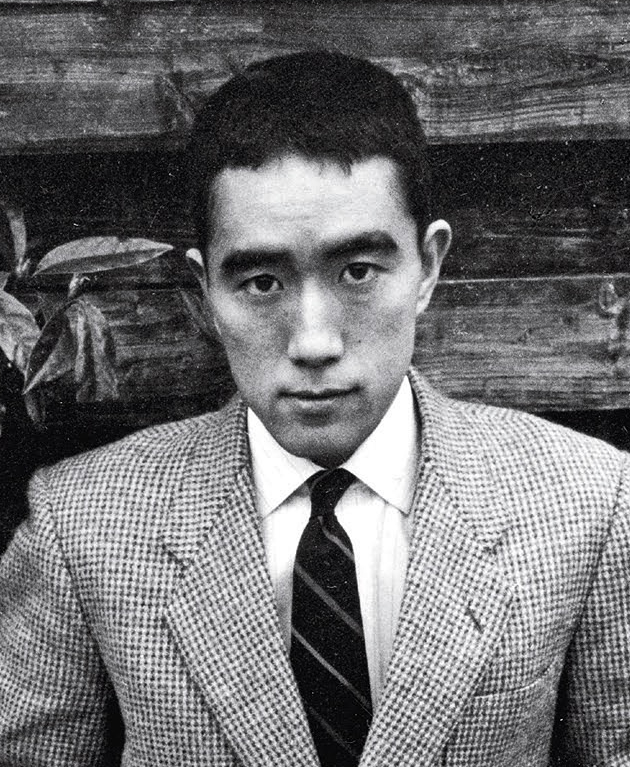
Author, poet, playwright, actor, model and militiaman Yukio Mishima

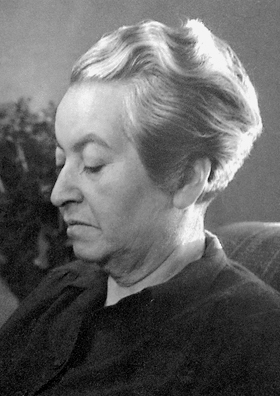
Poet-diplomat, educator, and humanist Gabriela Mistral

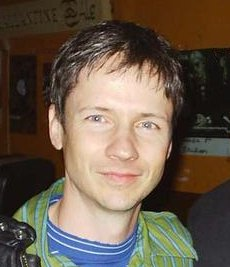
Director John Cameron Mitchell

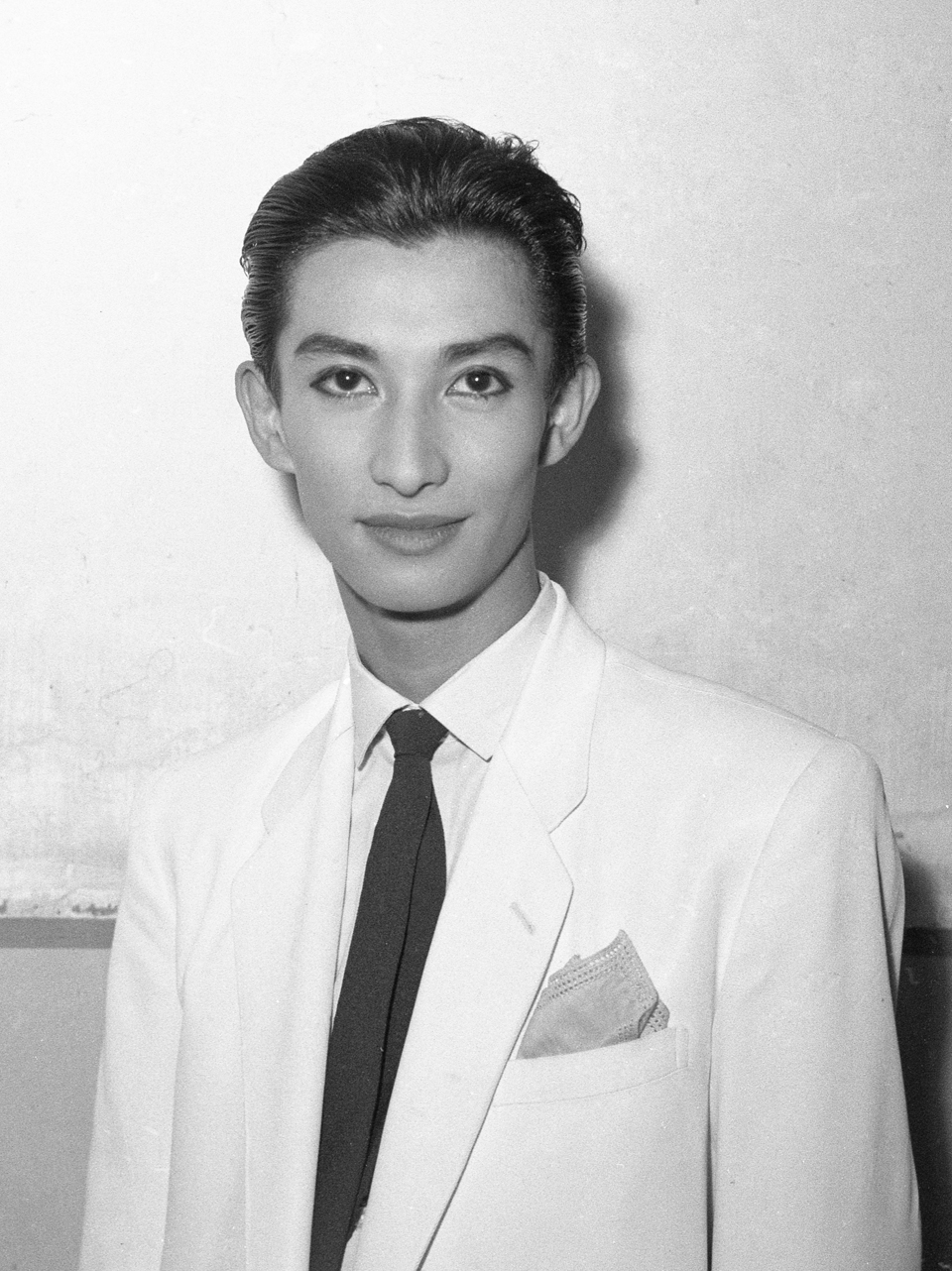
Singer, drag artist and actor Akihiro Miwa

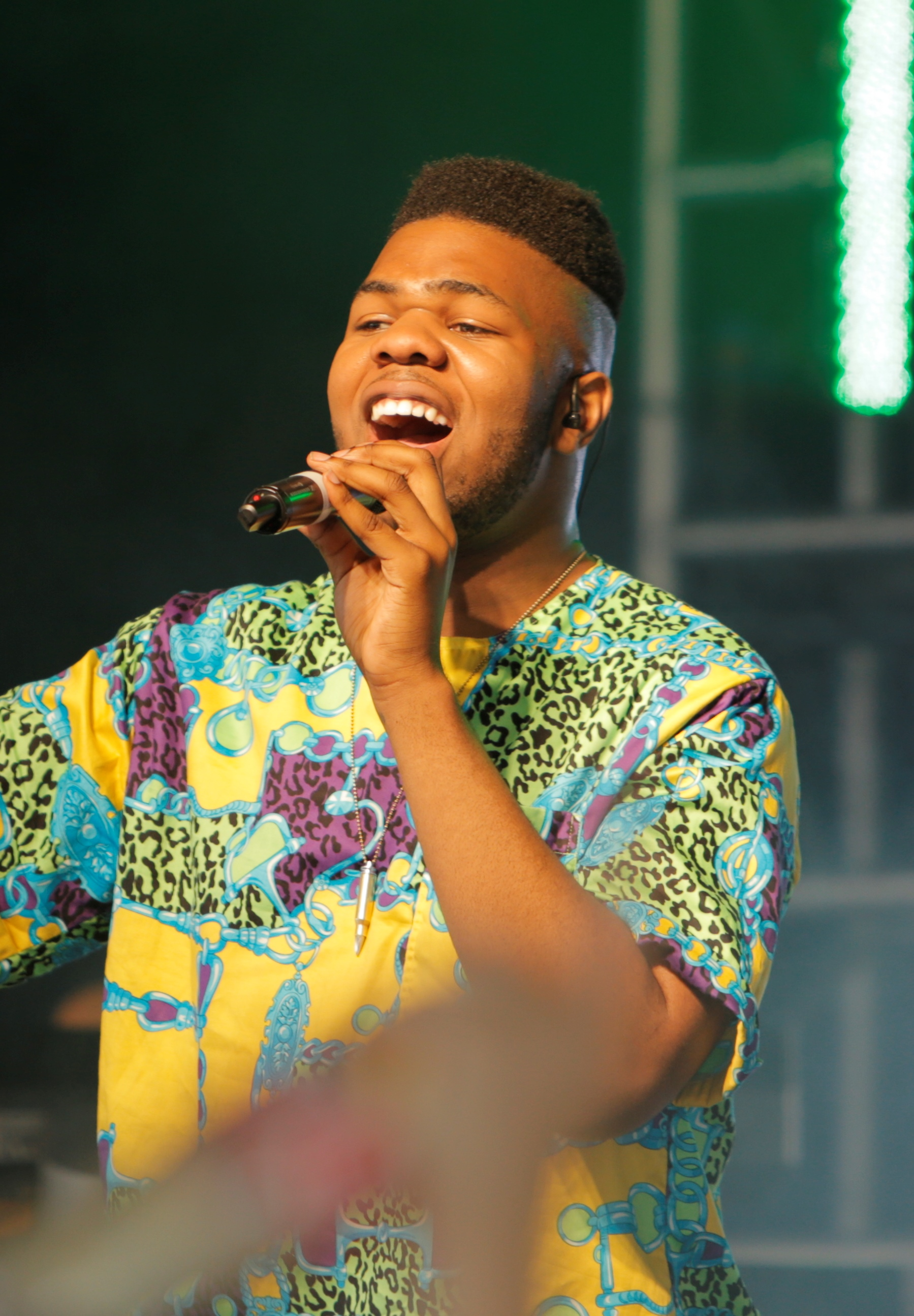
Singer MNEK

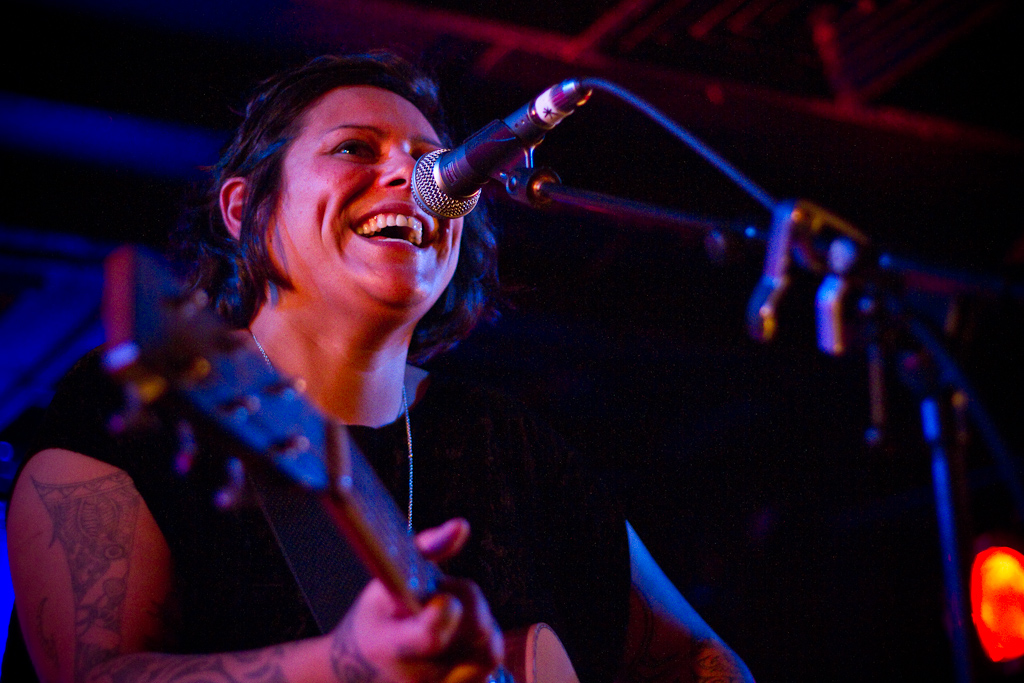
Pop singer Anika Moa

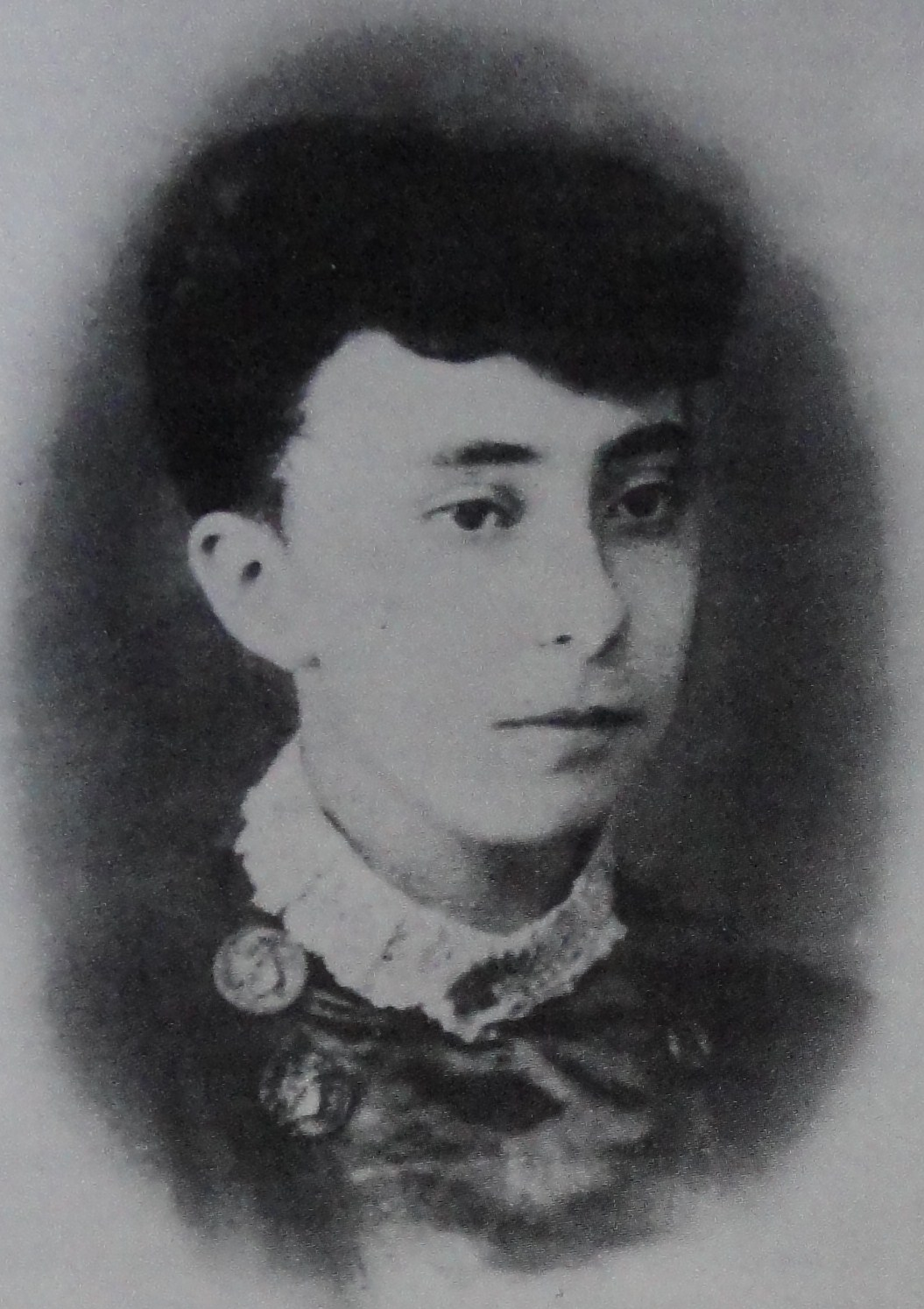
Writer, feminist and animal welfare activist Alice Moderno

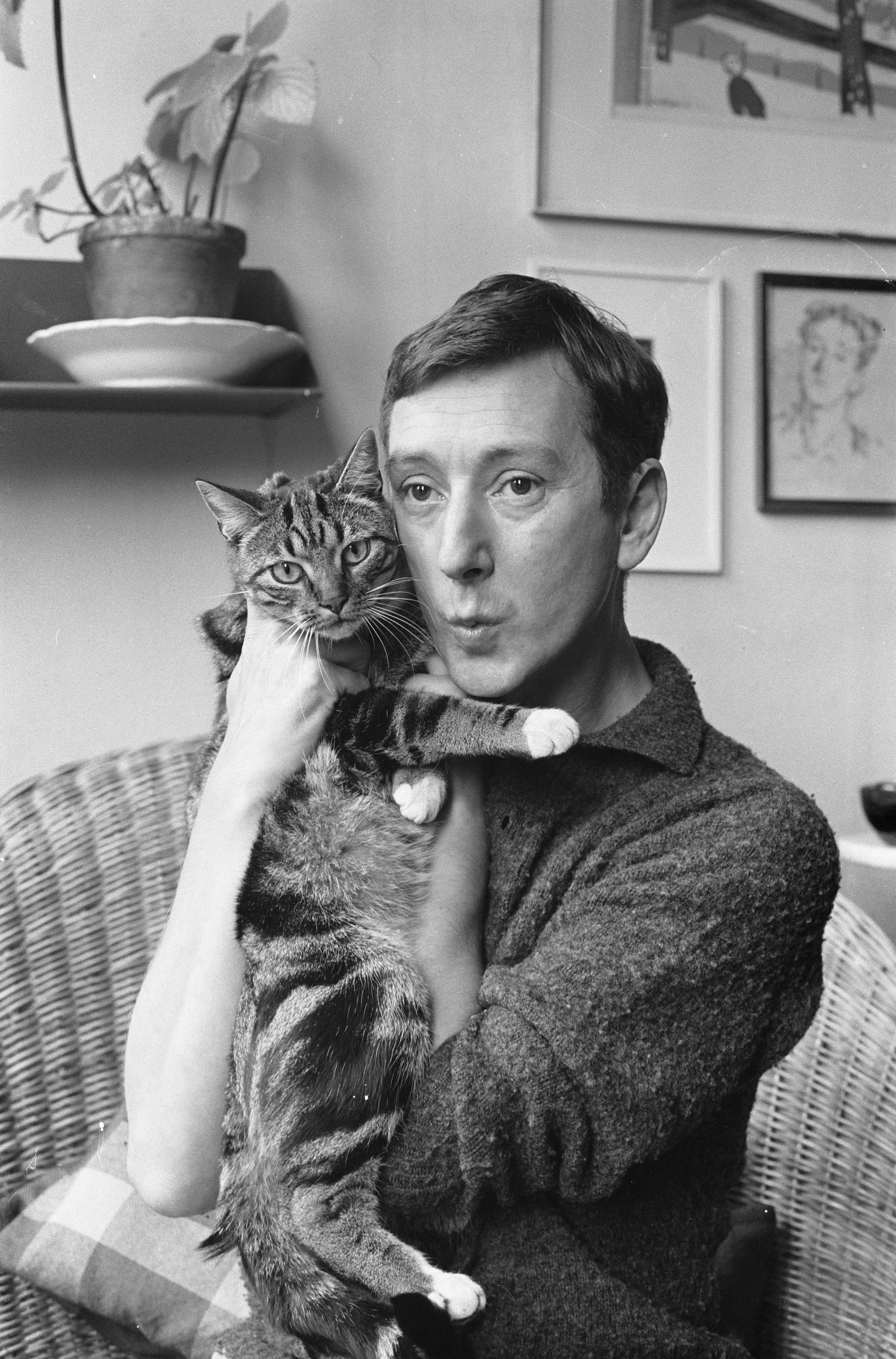
Actor, dancer, cabaret performer and writer Albert Mol

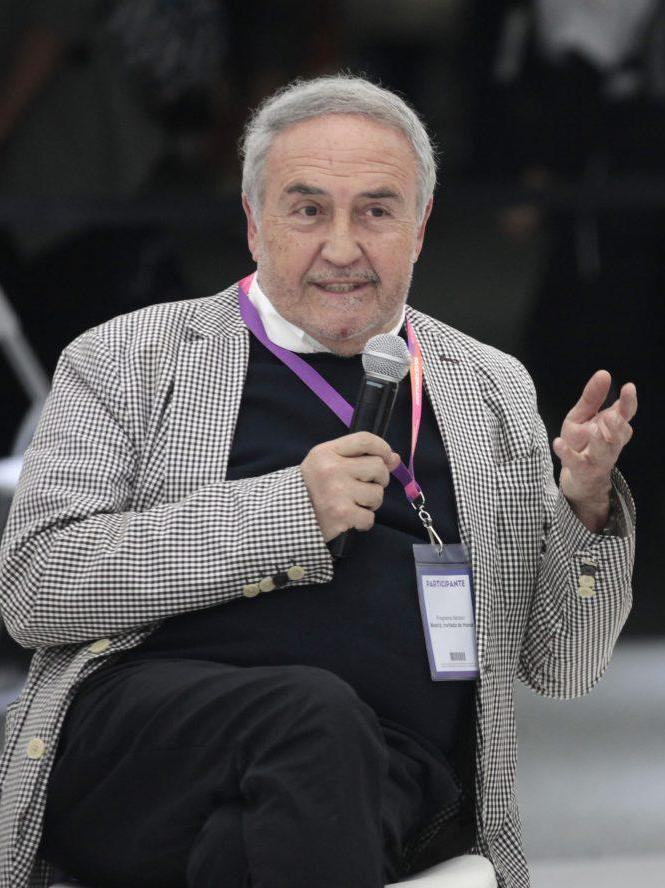
Director and writer Vicente Molina Foix

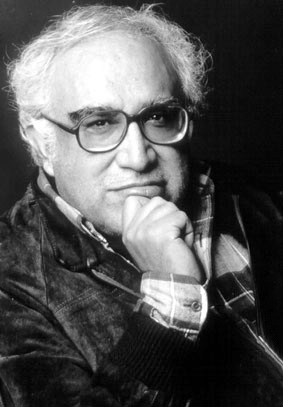
Writer, critic, activist and journalist Carlos Monsiváis

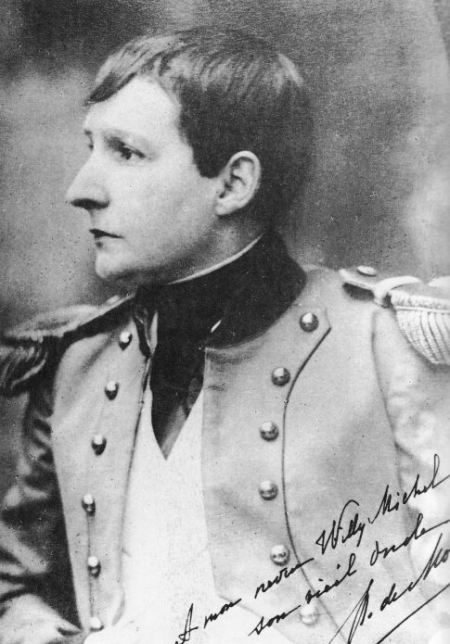
Artist Mathilde de Morny

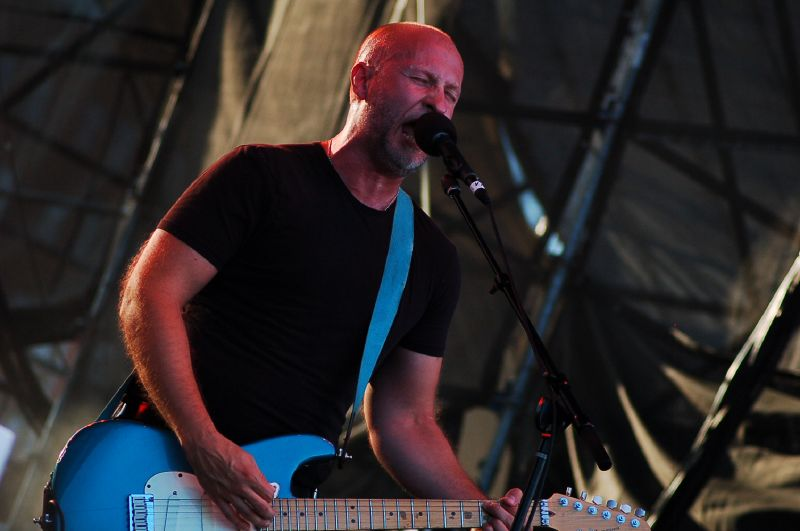
Rock musician Bob Mould

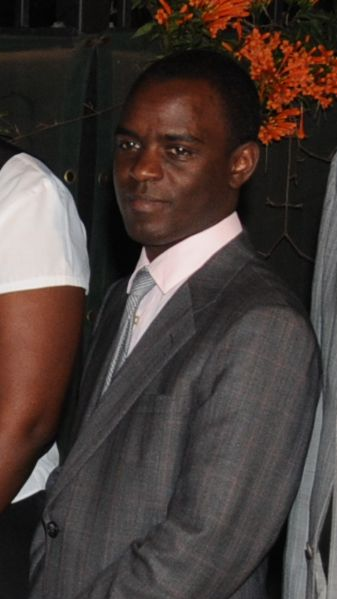
LGBT rights activist Frank Mugisha

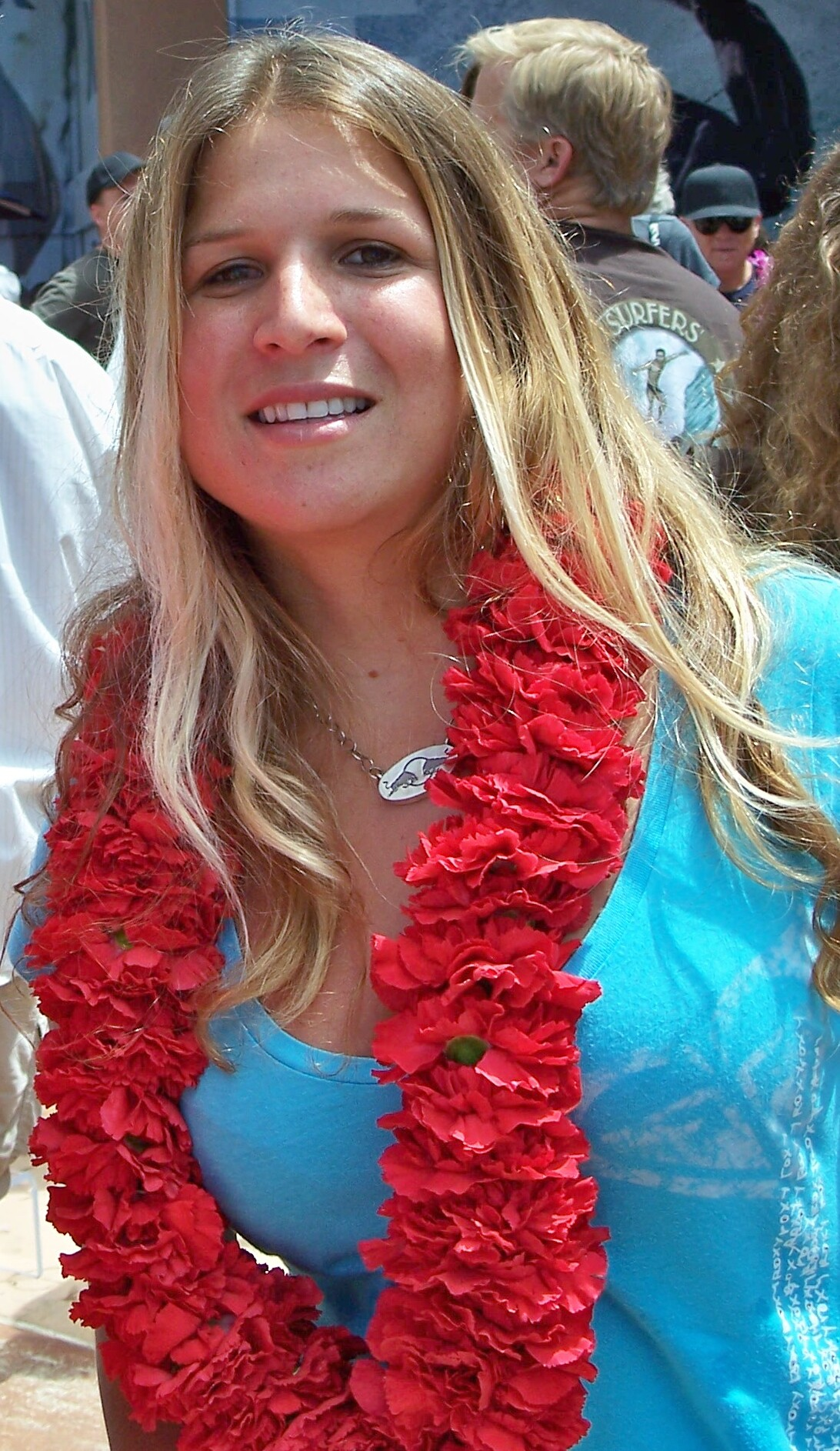
Surfer Sofía Mulánovich

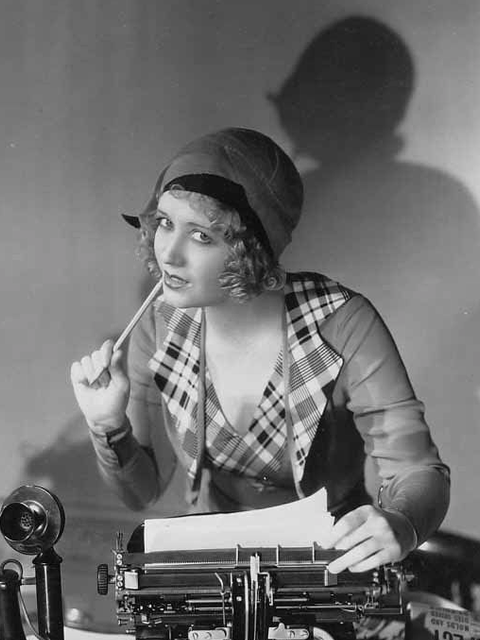
Actor Ona Munson

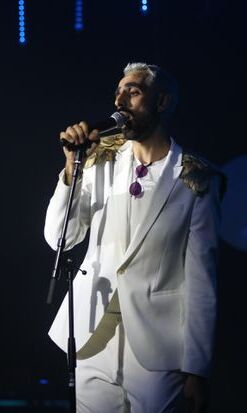
Singer Bashar Murad

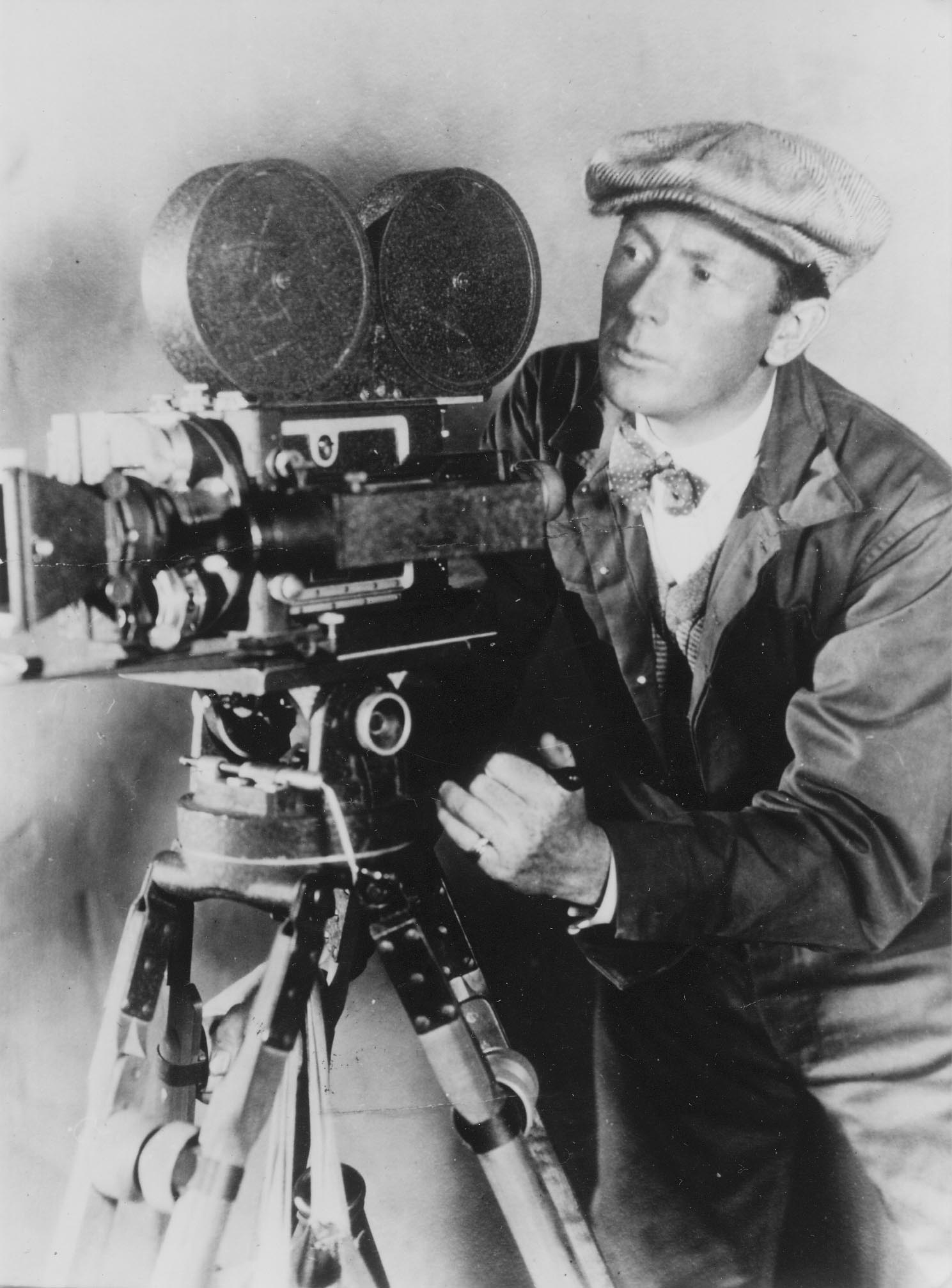
Director F. W. Murnau

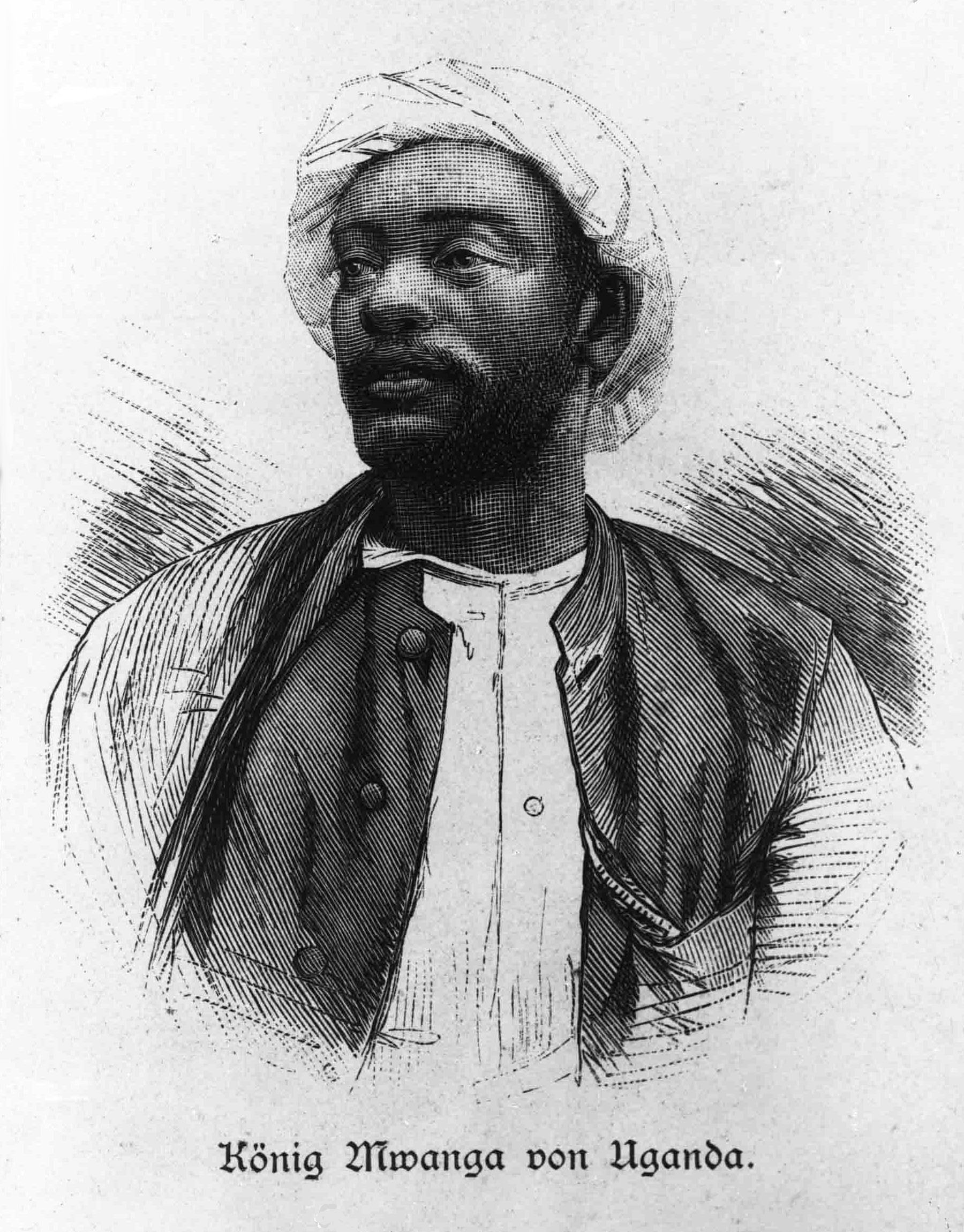
King Mwanga II of Buganda

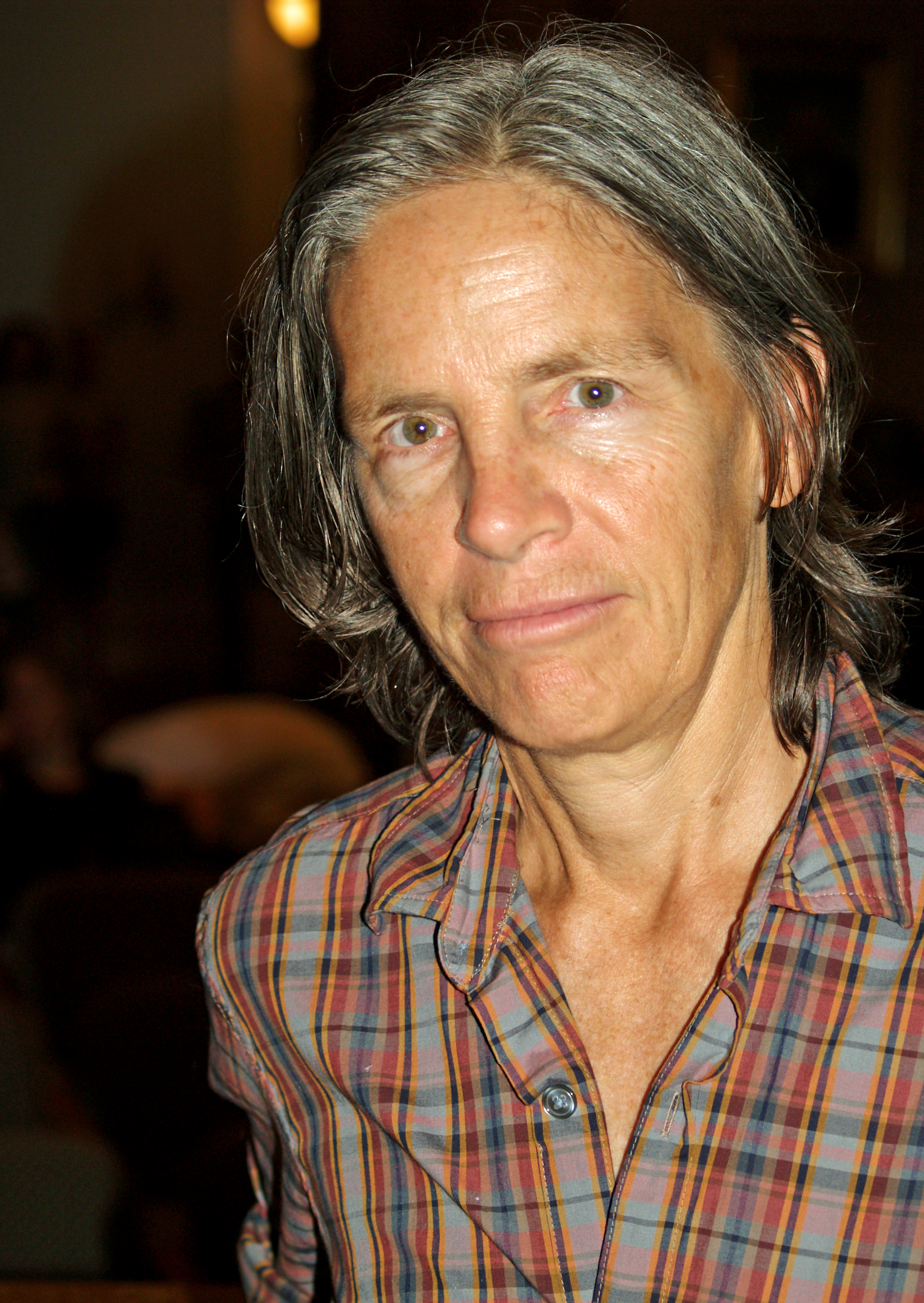
Writer Eileen Myles

Name	Lifetime	Nationality	Notable as	Notes
Cheryl Maas	b. 1984	Dutch	Snowboarder	L
Moms Mabley	1894–1975	American	Comedian, actor	L
Micheál Mac Liammóir	1899–1978	English-Irish	Actor, dramatist, impresario, writer, poet, painter	G
Robert MacBryde	1913–1966	Scottish	Artist	G
Diarmaid MacCulloch	b. 1951	English	Historian	G
Peter Macdissi	b. 1974	Lebanese	Actor	G
Ann-Marie MacDonald	b. 1958	Canadian	Playwright, novelist, journalist	L
Hamish MacDonald	b. 1981	Australian	Journalist, TV personality, news presenter	G
Jennifer Macdonald	b. ?	American	Artist	L
Luke Macfarlane	b. 1980	Canadian	Actor	G
Ryan MacGrath	b. ?	Canadian	Musician, painter	G
Neil MacGregor	b. 1946	Scottish	Art historian	G
Carmen Maria Machado	b. 1986	American	Writer	L
Eduardo Machado	b. 1953	Cuban-American	Playwright	G
Manuel Machado Alvarez	1960–2020	Cuban-American	Murderer	G
Colin MacInnes	1914–1976	English	Writer	G
Ashley MacIsaac	b. 1975	Canadian	Fiddler	G
Daniel MacIvor	b. 1962	Canadian	Actor, playwright, director	G
A.C. Mack	b. 1992	American	Professional wrestler	G
Yusaf Mack	b. 1980	American	Boxer	B
Derek Mackay	b. 1977	Scottish	Politician	G
Kenneth MacKenna	1899–1962	American	Actor, director	B
Jack Mackenroth	b. 1969	American	Fashion designer	G
Billy MacKenzie	1957–1997	Scottish	Singer (The Associates)	B
Bob Mackie	1939–2026	American	Fashion designer, costumer	G
Pearl Mackie	b. 1987	British	Actor, dancer, singer	B
Cameron Mackintosh	b. 1946	English	Theatrical producer	G
Wade MacLauchlan	b. 1954	Canadian	Academic, politician	G
Wendy MacNaughton	b. ?	American	Illustrator, graphic journalist	L
Robert MacPherson	b. 1944	American	Mathematician	G
Jeangu Macrooy	b. 1993	Surinamese	Singer	G
Madame Satã (João Francisco dos Santos)	1900–1976	Brazilian	Drag performer, capoeirista	G
Rachel Maddow	b. 1973	American	Radio and TV presenter, political pundit	L
Bulelwa Madekurozwa	b. 1972	Zimbabwean	Painter, printmaker	L
Ayesha Madon	b. 2001	Indian	Actor	B
Angela Madsen	1960–2020	American	Paralympian sportswoman	L
Jessica Madsen	b. 1992	English	Actress	B
David Madson	1963–1997	American	Activist and murder victim	G
Liliane Maestrini	b. 1987	Brazilian	Beach volleyball player	L
Carina Vance Mafla	b. 1977	Ecuadorian	Former Minister for Public Health	L
Ronald Magill	1920–2007	English	Actor	G
Irish Magno	b. 1991	Filipino	Boxer	L
Miguel Magno	1951–2009	Brazilian	Actor, director, author	G
Luka Magnotta	b. 1982	Canadian	Convicted murderer, former model and sex worker	B
Glenn Magpantay	b. 1969	American	Attorney, instructor, commissioner	G
Gregory Maguire	b. 1954	American	Author	G
Leslie Mah	b. 1964	American	Punk rock musician (Anti-Scrunti Faction, Tribe 8)	L
George Maharis	1928–2023	American	Actor	G
Moj Mahdara	b. ?	Iranian-American	CEO of Beautycon Media	L
Sean Maher	b. 1975	American	Actor	G
Florence Maheu	b. 1993	Canadian	Slalom canoeist	L
Mounir Mahjoubi	b. 1984	French	Politician	G
Mahmud of Ghazni	971–1030	Afghan/Ghaznavi	Sultan of Ghaznavid Empire in eastern Iran and northwestern Indian subcontinent	B
Nathalie Maillet	1970–2021	French	Architect, racecar driver, homicide victim	B
Olumide Makanjuola	b. ?	Nigerian	LGBT activist	G
Mikko Mäkelä	b. 1989	Finnish–British	Filmmaker	G
Mary Lou Makepeace	b. 1940	American	Politician	L
Jussi Mäkinen	1929–1978	Finnish	Ambassador, diplomat	G
Christopher Makos	b. 1948	American	Photographer, artist	G
Alain-Philippe Malagnac d'Argens de Villèle	1950–2000	French	Aristocrat	G
Énora Malagré	b. 1980	French	TV and radio presenter, columnist	B
Sanjaya Malakar	b. 1989	American	Singer, reality TV contestant	B
José Carlos Malato	b. 1964	Portuguese	TV presenter	G
Dalton Maldonado	b. 1995	American	Basketball player	G
Elham Malepoor	b. 1983	Iranian	Poet, writer, and journalist	L
Lou Maletta	1936–2011	American	Media executive, LGBT rights activist, founder of Gay Cable Network	G
Cristiano Malgioglio	b. 1945	Italian	Composer, singer-songwriter, TV personality	G
Suzanne Malherbe	1892–1972	French	Illustrator, designer	L
Liz Malia	b. 1949	American	Politician	L
Gene Malin	1908–1933	American	Actor, drag performer	G
Gray Malin	b. ?	American	Photographer	G
Rob Mallard	b. 1992	English	Actor	G
Shayne Mallard	b. 1964	Australian	Politician	G
Sean Patrick Maloney	b. 1966	American	Politician	G
David Malouf	1934–2026	Australian	Poet, novelist	G
Agnès Maltais	b. 1956	Canadian	Politician	L
Jeanne Mammen	1890–1976	German	Painter, illustrator	L
Houari Manar	1982–2019	Algerian	Raï singer	G
Don Mancini	b. 1963	American	Film director, screenwriter, producer	G
Philippe Jules Mancini, Duke of Nevers	1641–1707	Italian	Noble	G
Asttina Mandella	b. 1993	British	Drag performer	G
Rafael Mandelman	b. ?	American	Politician	G
Peter Mandelson	b. 1953	English	Politician	G
Jonathan Mane-Wheoki	1943–2014	New Zealand	Art historian, academic, curator	G
Hans van Manen	1932–2025	Dutch	Ballet dancer, choreographer, photographer	G
Mabel Maney	b. 1958	American	Writer	L
Barry Manilow	b. 1943	American	Singer-songwriter	G
Irshad Manji	b. 1968	Canadian	Islamic feminist author	L
Erika Mann	1905–1969	German	Writer, actor, war correspondent	L
Golo Mann	1909–1994	German	Historian, essayist, writer	G
Klaus Mann	1906–1949	German	Writer	G
Thomas Mann	1875–1955	German	Writer	G
Xulhaz Mannan	1976–2016	Bangladeshi	Writer, LGBT newspaper founder, murder victim	G
Rosemary Manning	1911–1988	English	Writer	L
Eddie Mannis	b. 1959	American	Politician	G
Manny MUA	b. 1991	American	Make-up artist, YouTuber, beauty blogger	G
Ernie Manouse	b. 1969	American	News presenter, producer	G
Jaime Manrique	b. 1949	Colombian-American	Author, poet, journalist	G
Roberto Manrique	b. 1979	Ecuadorian	Model, actor	G
Katherine Mansfield	1888–1923	New Zealand	Author	B
Robbie Manson	b. 1989	New Zealand	Rower	G
Karina Manta	b. 1996	American	Ice dancer	B
Joe Mantello	b. 1962	American	Actor, director	G
Evelyn Mantilla	b. 1963	American	Politician	B
Rosmit Mantilla	b. 1982	Venezuelan	Politician	G
Jay Manuel	b. 1972	Canadian	Make-up artist, fashion photographer	G
Alec Mapa	b. 1965	American	Actor	G
Robert Mapplethorpe	1946–1989	American	Photographer, artist	G
Jean Marais	1913–1998	French	Actor	B
Elisabeth Marbury	1856–1933	American	Literary and talent agent, translator	L
Paul Marcarelli	b. 1970	American	Actor	G
Maya Marcel-Keyes	b. 1985	American	Writer	L
Nimmy March	b. 1962	English	Actor	B
Anyda Marchant	1911–2006	Brazilian–American	Writer, lawyer	L
Jovette Marchessault	1938–2012	Canadian	Writer, artist	L
Ennio Marchetto	b. 1960	Italian	Comedian, entertainer	G
José María Marco	b. 1955	Spanish	Writer, essayist, liberal-conservative opinion journalist	G
Eric Marcus	b. 1958	American	Non-fiction writer	G
Jürgen Marcus	b. 1948	German	Pop and schlager singer	G
Marlene Marder	1954–2016	Swiss	Punk rock guitarist (LiLiPUT)	L
Roger Margason (aka Dorien Gray)	1933–2015	American	Mystery writer	G
Jamie Margolin	b. 2001	American	Climate justice activist	L
Miriam Margolyes	b. 1941	English	Actor	L
Artur Nory Mariano	b. 1993	Brazilian	Artistic gymnast	G
Samuel Mariño	b. 1993	Venezuelan-American	Soprano opera singer, recitalist	G
Félix Maritaud	b. 1992	French	Actor	G
Walterina Markova	1924–2005	Filipino	World War II sex slave	G
Elisebeht Markström	b. 1955	Swedish	Politician	L
Monica Márquez	b. 1969	American	Associate justice; 1st Latina and 1st openly gay person to serve on the Colorado Supreme Court	L
Del Marquis	b. 1977	American	Rock guitarist, musician (Scissor Sisters)	G
Gail Marquis	b. 1954	American	Basketball player, Wall Street executive	L
Dylan Marron	b. 1988	American	Actor, writer, comedian, activist	G
Ethel Mars	1876–1959	American	Woodblock print artist	L
Adam Mars-Jones	b. 1954	British	Writer	G
Gordon Marsden	b. 1953	English	Politician	G
Brian Marshall	b. 1965	Canadian	Athlete	G
Christabel Marshall	1871–1960	English	Suffragist, playwright, author	L
La'Darius Marshall	b. 1998	American	Cheerleader, TV personality	G
Rob Marshall	b. 1960	American	Film and theater director	G
Willy Marshall	b. ?	American	Politician	G
Yanis Marshall	b. 1989	French	Dancer	G
Marta (da Silva)	b. 1986	Brazilian	Footballer	L
Lucrecia Martel	b. 1966	Argentine	Film director, screenwriter, producer	L
Leo Martello	1931–2000	American	Wiccan priest, LGBT rights activist, author	G
Ian Marter	1944–1986	English	Actor, writer	B
Agnes Martin	1912–2004	American	Painter	L
Andrew Martin	b. 1964	American	Politician	G
Ann M. Martin	b. 1955	American	Writer of children's literature	L
Christy Martin	b. 1968	American	Boxer	L
Collin Martin	b. 1994	American	Soccer player	G
Del Martin	1921–2008	American	Feminist and LGBT-rights activist	L
Douglas A. Martin	b. 1973	American	Writer	G
James Martin	b. 1965	American	Politician	G
Mae Martin	b. 1987	Canadian	Comedian, actor	B
Ricky Martin	b. 1971	Puerto Rican	Singer, actor	G
Nigel Martin-Smith	b. ?	English	Entertainment manager	G
Sandy Martin	b. 1957	English	Politician	G
Arkady Martine	b. ?	American	Science fiction author, historian	L
Jacques Martineau	b. 1963	French	Film director, screenwriter	G
Nella Martinetti	1946–2011	Swiss	Singer-songwriter	L
Conchita Martínez	b. 1972	Spanish	Tennis player	L
Cristina E. Martinez	b. 1961	American	CEO, community activist	L
Mauricio Martínez	b. 1978	Mexican	Actor, singer	G
Melanie Martinez	b. 1995	American	Singer-songwriter	B
Mercedes Martinez	b. 1980	American	Professional wrestler	L
Raúl Martínez	1927–1995	Cuban	Artist	G
Ursula Martinez	b. 1966	British	Performance artist	L
Vicci Martinez	b. 1984	American	Singer-songwriter	L
Boman "Bomanizer" Martinez-Reid	b. ?	Canadian	Comedian, TikTok content creator	G
Ana María Martínez Sagi	1907–2000	Spanish	Journalist, poet, trade unionist, feminist activist, athlete	L
Míriam Martinho	b. 1954	Brazilian	Feminist, journalist	L
Lizzie Marvelly	b. 1989	New Zealand	Singer	B
Zsuzsi Mary	1947–2011	Hungarian	Pop singer	B
Jeff Marx	b. 1970	American	Lyricist, composer	G
Kōsaka Masanobu	1527–1578	Japanese	Samurai warrior of the Sengoku period	G
Angela Mason	b. 1944	English	LGBT rights activist	L
Nan Mason	1896–1982	American	Artist and photographer	L
Valerie Mason-John	b. 1962	British-Canadian	Author, speaker	L
Lawrence D. Mass	b. 1946	American	Physician, writer	G
Manon Massé	b. 1963	Canadian	Politician	L
Kyle Dean Massey	b. 1981	American	Actor	G
Léonide Massine	1896–1979	Russian	Choreographer, ballet dancer	B
Ivan Massow	b. 1967	English	Entrepreneur, politician	G
Billy Masters	b. 1969	American	Gossip columnist	G
Paul Masvidal	b. 1971	American	Musician, vocalist (Cynic, Æon Spoke)	G
Heather Matarazzo	b. 1982	American	Actor	L
David Matheson	b. ?	American	Former "gay cure" therapist	G
Dan Mathews	b. 1964	American	Animal rights activist	G
Kerwin Mathews	1926–2007	American	Actor	G
Ross Mathews	b. 1979	American	TV personality	G
Travis Mathews	b. 1975	American	Film director, screenwriter	G
Sean Mathias	b. 1956	British	Theatre and film director, writer, actor	G
Johnny Mathis	b. 1935	American	Pop musician	G
Leonard Matlovich	1943–1988	American	Vietnam War veteran, race relations instructor, recipient of the Purple Heart and the Bronze Star, and 1st gay service member to purposely out himself to the military to fight their ban on gays	G
Ney Matogrosso	b. 1941	Brazilian	Singer	G
Ian Matos	1989–2021	Brazilian	Olympic diver	G
Mark Matousek	b. 1957	American	Journalist, spiritual writer	G
Gary Matson	1949–1999	American	Murder victim	G
Matsuo Bashō	1644–1694	Japanese	Poet	G
Griffin Matthews	b. 1981/1982	American	Actor	G
F. O. Matthiessen	1902–1950	American	Academic	G
Andrew Mattison	1948–2005	American	Writer, psychologist, researcher	G
Alison Mau	b. 1965	New Zealand	TV journalist and presenter	L
Corine Mauch	b. 1960	Swiss	Politician	L
Robin Maugham	1916–1981	English	Author	G
W. Somerset Maugham	1874–1965	English	Writer	G
Armistead Maupin	b. 1944	American	Writer	G
Bill Maurer	b. ?	American	Legal and economic anthropologist	G
Amélie Mauresmo	b. 1979	French	Tennis player	L
Daphne du Maurier	1907–1989	English	Author	B
Nicolas Maury	b. 1980	French	Actor, film director	G
Nergis Mavalvala	b. 1968	Pakistani-American	Astrophysicist	L
Glen Maxey	b. 1952	American	Politician	G
Elsa Maxwell	1883–1963	American	Gossip columnist	L
Craig Maxwell-Keys	b. ?	British	Rugby referee	G
Steve May	b. 1972	American	Politician	G
John Maybury	b. 1958	English	Film director	G
Erin Maye Quade	b. 1986	American	Politician	L
Hans Mayer	1907–2001	German	Literary critic	G
Andrew M. Maynard	b. 1962	American	Politician	G
Brooke Mayo	b. 1988/1989	American	Soccer referee	L
Chandra Mayor	b. 1973	Canadian	Writer	L
Stephany Mayor	b. 1991	Mexican	Footballer	L
Suzette Mayr	b. ?	Canadian	Writer	L
Carlos Maza	b. 1988	American	Journalist	G
Jean-Claude Roger Mbede	b. ?	Cameroonian	Imprisoned for his homosexuality	G
Zakhele Mbhele	b. 1984	South African	Politician	G
Al McAffrey	b. 1948	American	Politician	G
David McAlmont	b. 1967	English	Singer	G
Shane McAnally	b. 1974	American	Country music singer	G
Angus McBean	1904–1990	Welsh	Photographer	G
Marnie McBean	b. 1968	Canadian	Rower	L
Tom McBride	1952−1995	American	Actor, model	G
Martha McCabe	b. 1989	Canadian	Swimmer	L
Nell McCafferty	b. 1944	Irish	Journalist, playwright	L
Robert McCall	1958–1991	Canadian	Figure skater	G
Lon McCallister	1923–2005	American	Actor	G
Richard McCann	b. 1949	American	Writer	G
Beth McCarthy	b. 1997	English	Singer-songwriter	B
Nick McCarthy	b. 1995	Irish	Rugby player	G
Tawiah M'carthy	b. ?	Ghanaian-Canadian	Actor, playwright	G
Mandy McCartin	b. 1958	English	Artist	L
Stephen McCauley	b. 1955	American	Writer	G
Anne McClain	b. 1979	American	Astronaut	L
J.D. McClatchy	1945–2018	American	Writer	G
Haylie McCleney	b. 1994	American	Softball player	L
Thomas McCosker	b. 1950	Australian	Textile worker, jailed in Fiji for sodomy	G
Angel McCoughtry	b. 1986	American	Basketball player	L
Alec McCowen	1925–2017	English	Actor	G
Matt McCoy	b. 1966	American	Politician	G
Scott McCoy	b. 1970	American	Politician	G
Tarell Alvin McCraney	b. 1980	American	Playwright, actor	G
John McCrea	b. 1977	English	Actor, singer	G
Logan McCree	b. 1977	German	Pornographic actor	B
Julie McCrossin	b. 1954	Australian	Journalist, comedian	L
John McCrostie	b. ?	American	Politician	G
Kevin McDaid	b. 1984	English	Pop singer (V)	G
Val McDermid	b. 1955	Scottish	Writer	L
Joe McDermott	b. 1967	American	Politician	G
Keith McDermott	b. 1953	American	Actor, theater director, writer	G
Andrew J. McDonald	b. 1966	American	Associate Justice of the Connecticut Supreme Court and former politician	G
Jon-Marc McDonald	b. 1976	American	Writer, political activist	G
Ray McDonald	1944–1993	American	Football player	G
Roddy McDowall	1928–1998	English	Actor, voice artist, film director, photographer	G
Michael McDowell	1950–1999	American	Novelist, screenwriter	G
Joe McElderry	b. 1991	English	Pop singer	G
Guy McElroy	1948–1990	American	Art historian	G
Brian McGahen	1952–1990	Australian	LGBT activist	G
Peter McGehee	1955–1991	Canadian	Writer	G
Scott McGehee	b. 1962	American	Film director, screenwriter	G
Kelly McGillis	b. 1957	American	Actor	L
Brock McGillis	b. 1983	Canadian	Ice hockey goaltender, LGBT activist	G
Jenn McGinn	b. ?	Canadian	Politician	L
Jamie McGonnigal	b. 1975	American	Actor, producer	G
Jonny McGovern	b. 1976	American	Comedian, musician, podcaster	G
Jim McGreevey	b. 1957	American	Governor of New Jersey	G
Susan McGreivy	b. 1939	American	Attorney, former Olympic swimmer	L
Kevin McHale	b. 1988	American	Actor, pop singer (NLT), TV and radio personality	G
Maggie McIntosh	b. 1947	American	Politician, first openly gay person in the Maryland General Assembly	L
Claude McKay	1889–1948	Jamaican	Writer	B
Molly McKay	b. 1970	American	Attorney, LGBT rights activist	L
Lyra McKee	1990–2019	Northern Irish	Journalist	L
Ian McKellen	b. 1939	English	Actor, LGBT rights activist	G
Sabrina McKenna	b. 1957	American	Justice of the Hawaii Supreme Court	L
Todd McKenney	b. 1965	Australian	Actor	G
Austin P. McKenzie	b. 1993	American	Actor	G
Larry McKeon	1944–2008	American	Politician	G
Erin McKeown	b. 1977	American	Pop musician	L
Les McKeown	1955–2021	Scottish	Pop singer (Bay City Rollers)	B
DeRay Mckesson	b. 1985	American	Activist	G
Evan McKie	b. 1983	Canadian	Ballet dancer, writer, artist, creative movement director	G
Sophie McKinna	b. 1994	English	Shot putter	L
Stewart McKinney	1931–1987	American	Politician	B
Kate McKinnon	b. 1983	American	Comedian	L
Marshall Kirk McKusick	b. 1954	American	Computer scientist	G
Norman McLaren	1914–1987	Canadian	Animator, film director	G
Andrew McLean	b. ?	American	Politician	G
Colin McLean	b. 1978	Australian	Drag queen, fashion designer	G
Erin McLeod	b. 1983	Canadian	Soccer player	L
Jamie McLeod-Skinner	b. 1967	American	Attorney, engineer, politician	L
Claire McNab	b. 1940	Australian	Writer	L
Terrence McNally	1939–2020	American	Playwright	G
John J. McNeill	1925–2015	American	Priest, author	G
Kristy McNichol	b. 1962	American	Actor	L
Colin McPhee	1900–1964	Canadian	20th-century classical composer, ethnomusicologist	G
Heather McPherson	1942–2017	New Zealand	Poet	L
Inika McPherson	b. 1986	American	High jumper	L
Glenn McQuaid	b. 1973	Irish	Film director	G
Alexander McQueen	1969–2010	English	Fashion designer	G
Casey McQuiston	b. 1991	American	Romance author	B
Carmen McRae	1920–1994	American	Jazz musician	L
Dorothy McRae-McMahon	b. 1934	Australian	Uniting Church minister, activist	L
David McReynolds	1929–2018	American	Politician, activist	G
Jimmy McShane	1957–1995	Northern Irish	Pop singer (Baltimora)	G
Michael J. McShane	b. 1961	American	Judge of the U.S. District Court	G
Peter McWilliams	1940–2000	American	Writer, activist	G
David McVicar	b. 1967	Scottish	Opera director	G
Beth Mead	b. 1995	English	Footballer	L
Margaret Mead	1901–1978	American	Anthropologist	B
Taylor Mead	1924–2013	American	Writer, actor, performer	G
Marijane Meaker	1927–2022	American	Writer	L
Kevin Meaney	1956–2016	American	Comedian	G
Miriam Meckel	b. 1967	German	Journalist, academic, magazine editor and publisher	L
Linda Medalen	b. 1965	Norwegian	Footballer	L
Doron Medalie	b. 1977	Israeli	Songwriter, composer, artistic director	G
Gian Gastone de' Medici, Grand Duke of Tuscany	1671–1737	Tuscan	Last Medici grand duke	G
Benny Medina	b. 1958	American	Talent agent, producer	G
Robert Medley	1905–1994	English	Artist	G
Mark Medlock	b. 1978	German	Singer	G
Benjamín Medrano Quezada	b. ?	Mexican	Politician; first openly gay mayor ever elected in Mexico	G
Lauren Meece	b. 1983	American	Olympic judoka	L
Joe Meek	1929–1967	English	Record producer	G
Ken Mehlman	b. 1966	American	Businessman, campaign manager for George W. Bush	G
Julie Mehretu	b. 1970	Ethiopian-American	Artist	L
Karl Meier	1897–1974	Swiss	Actor, gay rights activist	G
Mary Meigs	1917–2002	American	Painter, writer	L
Simona Meiler	b. 1989	Swiss	Snowboarder	L
Doeschka Meijsing	1947–2012	Dutch	Novelist	L
Meryl Meisler	b. 1951	American	Photographer	L
Ian Meldrum	1943–2026	Australian	Popular music critic, journalist, musical entrepreneur	G
Gustavo Melella	b. 1970	Argentine	Politician	G
Ainsley Melham	b. 1991	Australian	Actor	G
Ioannis Melissanidis	b. 1977	Greek	Gymnast	G
Deb Mell	b. 1968	American	Politician	L
Dawn Mellor	b. 1970	English	Painter	L
Guilherme de Melo	b. 1931	Portuguese	Journalist, novelist, activist	G
Mélovin	b. 1997	Ukrainian	Singer-songwriter	B
Glennon Doyle Melton	b. 1976	American	Author, activist, philanthropist, online community creator and founder	L
Wendy Melvoin	b. 1964	American	Musician (Prince & the Revolution, Wendy & Lisa), TV and film composer	L
Javiera Mena	b. 1983	Chilean	Electropop musician	L
Réal Ménard	b. 1962	Canadian	Member of Parliament	G
Carlos Menchaca	b. 1980	American	Politician; 1st openly gay New York City Council member from Brooklyn	G
Charlotte Mendelson	b. 1972	English	Writer	L
Luis Gerardo Méndez	b. 1982	Mexican	Actor	G
Paul Mendez	b. ?	British	Author	G
Rosie Mendez	b. 1963	Puerto Rican	Politician	L
Rosa Mendes	b. 1979	Canadian	Professional wrestler	B
José María Mendiluce	1951–2015	Spanish	Writer, activist, politician	G
H.P. Mendoza	b. 1977	American	Film director, screenwriter, actor, producer, musician	G
Indyra Mendoza	b. 1968	Honduran	LGBT+ activist	L
David Menkin	b. ?	Norwegian	Actor	G
Gian Carlo Menotti	1911–2007	Italian	20th-century classical composer	G
Billy Merasty	b. 1960	First Nations-Canadian	Actor, writer	G
Jorge Merced	b. 1965	Puerto Rican	Theatre actor and director	G
Rick Mercer	b. 1969	Canadian	TV personality, political satirist	G
Hoshang Merchant	b. 1947	Indian	Writer	G
Ismail Merchant	1936–2005	Indian-British	Film producer	G
Daniela Mercury	b. 1965	Brazilian	Singer-songwriter	B
Freddie Mercury	1946–1991	British	Rock musician	B
William Morris Meredith Jr.	1919–2007	American	Poet	G
Lída Merlínová	1906–1988	Czech	Writer	L
Billy Merrell	b. 1982	American	Writer	G
George Merrill	1867–1928	English	Poet, philosopher, gay activist	G
James Merrill	1926–1995	American	Poet	G
Stephin Merritt	b. 1965	American	Singer-songwriter, musician (The Magnetic Fields)	G
Conner Mertens	b. 1994/1995	American	Football player	B
André Carl van der Merwe	b. 1961	South African	Novelist	G
Vladimir Meshchersky	1839–1914	Russian	Journalist	G
Adolfo Mesquita Nunes	b. 1977	Portuguese	Politician, jurist	G
Kim Mestdagh	b. 1990	Belgian	Basketball player	L
Harriet Metcalf	b. 1958	American	Rower	L
Brenton Metzler	b. ?	American	Television producer	G
Charlotte Mew	1869–1928	English	Poet	L
Kristie Mewis	b. 1991	American	Soccer player	L
Kim Meylemans	b. 1996	Belgian	Skeleton racer	L
Inge Meysel	1910–2004	German	Actor	B
Robert Meza	b. ?	American	Politician	G
Somizi Mhlongo	b. 1972	South African	Choreographer, TV personality	G
George Michael	1963–2016	English	Pop musician	G
Jillian Michaels	b. 1974	American	Personal trainer, TV personality	L
Tammy Lynn Michaels	b. 1974	American	Actor	L
Theresa Michalak	b. 1992	German	Swimmer	L
Duane Michals	b. 1932	American	Photographer	G
Michelangelo	1475–1564	Italian	Sculptor, painter	G
Alessandro Michele	b. 1972	Italian	Fashion designer	G
Domien Michiels	b. 1983	French	Equestrian	G
Vivianne Miedema	b. 1996	Dutch	Footballer	L
Aldo Mieli	1879–1950	Italian	Science historian, gay rights activist	G
Mario Mieli	1952–1983	Italian	Gay rights and political activist, theorist	G
Andy Mientus	b. 1986	American	Actor	B
Linda Mienzer	b. 1965	Bermudian	Cricketer	L
Matthias Miersch	b. 1968	German	Politician	G
Carole Migden	b. 1948	American	Politician	L
Leonardo Miggiorin	b. 1982	Brazilian	Actor, psychologist	G
Ioan Luchian Mihalea	1951–1993	Romanian	Composer, conductor, TV producer	G
Sandra Mihanovich	b. 1957	Argentine	Singer, musician, composer, actor	L
Mika	b. 1983	Lebanese-British	Singer-songwriter	G
Kenichi Mikawa	b. 1946	Japanese	Singer, TV personality	G
Susan Mikula	b. 1958	American	Artist, photographer	L
John Milhiser	b. 1981	American	Actor, comedian	G
Woody Milintachinda	b. 1976	Thai	TV host	G
Harvey Milk	1930–1978	American	Politician, LGBT rights activist	G
Tomas Milian	1933–2017	Cuban-American-Italian	Actor, singer	B
Lorri Millan	b. ?	Canadian	Performance artist, writer	L
Edna St. Vincent Millay	1892–1950	American	Poet	L
Eric Millegan	b. 1974	American	Actor	G
Brent Miller	b. ?	American	TV and film producer	G
Curt Miller	b. 1968	American	Basketball coach	G
Ezra Miller	b. 1992	American	Actor	B
Jacob & Joshua Miller	b. ?	American	Pop musicians (Nemesis)	G
Jennifer Miller	b. 1961	American	Circus entertainer, educator	L
Merle Miller	1919–1986	American	Novelist, writer, author	G
Sam J. Miller	b. 1979	American	Science fiction, fantasy and horror short fiction author	G
Scott Miller	b. ?	American	LGBT rights activist, philanthropist, banker	G
Stephanie Miller	b. 1961	American	Comedian, radio host	L
Tim Miller	b. 1958	American	Performance artist	G
T'Nia Miller	b. ?	English	Actor	L
Wentworth Miller	b. 1972	American	Actor	G
Sally Miller Gearhart	b. 1931	American	Science-fiction writer, feminist and lesbian activist, teacher	L
Andy Milligan	1929–1991	American	Writer, film director	G
Patrick Milliner	1982/1983–2013	American	Activist, corrections officer	G
June Millington	b. 1948	Filipino-American	Rock musician, guitarist (Fanny)	L
Mary Millington	1945–1979	English	Actor, model	B
Debbie Millman	b. 1962	American	Writer, educator, artist, curator, designer	L
David Mills	b. ?	American	Actor	G
Pat Mills	b. ?	Canadian	Film director, screenwriter, actor	G
Scott Mills	b. 1974	English	DJ	G
Barnaby Miln	b. 1947	Scottish	Activist, Church of England General Synod; justice of the peace	G
Simon Milton	1961–2011	English	Politician	G
Daniel Minahan	b. 1962	American	Television and film director, writer	G
Marla Mindelle	b. 1984	American	Musical theatre actress	L
Hans Peter Minderhoud	b. 1973	Dutch	Equestrian	G
Sal Mineo	1939–1976	American	Actor	B
Vincente Minnelli	1903–1986	American	Stage and film director	B
Greet Minnen	b. 1997	Belgian	Tennis player	L
John Minton	1917–1957	English	Artist	G
Kayla Miracle	b. 1996	American	Wrestler	L
David Miranda	1985–2023	Brazilian	Journalist, politician	G
Raphael Miranda	b. 1977	American	Meteorologist, TV personality	G
Leonard Miron	b. 1969	Romanian	TV and radio presenter, journalist	G
Fawzia Mirza	b. ?	Pakistani-Canadian	Actor, writer, producer, comedian	L
Goh Mishima	1924–1988	Japanese	Artist, magazine founder	G
Yukio Mishima	1925–1970	Japanese	Author	G
Gabriela Mistral	1889–1957	Chilean	Poet, educator, diplomat, feminist, Nobel laureate in literature	L
Matthew Mitcham	b. 1988	Australian	Diver	G
Alice Mitchell	1872–1898	American	Convicted murderer	L
Arthur Mitchell	1934–2018	American	Dancer, choreographer	G
Allyson Mitchell	b. ?	Canadian	Maximalist artist	L
John Cameron Mitchell	b. 1963	American	Director, actor	G
Leilani Mitchell	b. 1985	American-Australian	Basketball player	L
McKim Mitchell	b. 1954	American	Politician	G
Dimitri Mitropoulos	1896–1960	Greek	Classical conductor, musician and composer	G
Yūji Mitsuya	b. 1954	Japanese	Actor, voice actor	G
Frédéric Mitterrand	b. 1946	French	Politician	B
Akihiro Miwa	b. 1935	Japanese	Singer, author, actor, director	G
David Mixner	1946–2024	American	Activist, author	G
Bob Mizer	1922–1992	American	Photographer, filmmaker	G
Heather Mizeur	b. 1972	American	Politician	L
Mizi Xia	b. d. ?	Chinese (Zhou Dynasty)	Courtier, historical figure	G
Isaac Mizrahi	b. 1961	American	Fashion designer	G
MNEK	b. 1994	British	Singer, songwriter, record producer	G
Anika Moa	b. 1980	New Zealand	Pop musician	L
Alice Moderno	1867–1946	Portuguese	Writer, feminist, animal welfare activist	L
Silvia Modig	b. 1976	Finnish	Politician	L
Portia Modise	b. 1983	South African	Footballer	L
Jim Moeller	b. 1955	American	Politician	G
Slava Mogutin	b. 1974	Russian	Artist, writer, activist	G
Rajiv Mohabir	b. ?	American	Author	G
Mary Anne Mohanraj	b. 1971	Sri Lankan	Writer	B
Bahman Mohasses	1931–2010	Iranian	Painter, sculptor, theater director	G
Emmanuel Moire	b. 1979	French	Singer, composer	G
Chris Moise	b. ?	Canadian	Politician	G
Mojo Juju	b. 1983	Australian	Singer-songwriter, guitarist	L
Albert Mol	1917–2004	Dutch	Actor, LGBT activist	G
Frans Molenaar	1940–2015	Dutch	Fashion designer	G
Adrian Molina	b. 1985	American	Filmmaker	G
Jeff Molina	b. 1997	American	Mixed martial arts fighter	B
Vicente Molina Foix	b. 1946	Spanish	Writer, film director	G
Brian Molko	b. 1972	British-American	Rock musician (Placebo)	B
Kuno von Moltke	1847–1923	German	Military commander	G
David Monahan	b. 1971	American	Actor	G
Francisco Monción	1918–1995	Dominican–American	Ballet dancer	G
Monét X Change	b. 1990	American	Drag performer	G
Victoria Monét	b. 1989	American	Singer, songwriter	B
Paul Monette	1945–2005	American	Writer	G
Hildegard Moniac	1891–1967	German	Educator, activist	L
Monifah	b. 1972	American	Singer-songwriter	L
Adrienne Monnier	1892–1955	French	Writer, bookseller, publisher	L
Carlos Monsiváis	1938–2010	Mexican	Writer, critic, activist, journalist	G
Gordon Montador	1950–1991	Canadian	Editor, publisher, broadcaster	G
Armando Montaño	1989–2012	American	Journalist	G
Robert de Montesquiou	1855–1921	French	Writer, art collector, socialite	G
Luke Montgomery	b. 1974	American	Political activist	G
Matthew Montgomery	b. 1978	American	Actor	G
Henry de Montherlant	1895–1972	French	Writer	G
Diego Montoya	b. 1982/1983	American	Visual artist, fashion designer	G
Roger Montoya	b. 1961	American	Humanitarian, painter, dancer, gymnast, politician	G
CJ de Mooi	b. 1969	English	TV quiz host, actor, chess player, model	G
Matt Moonen	b. ?	American	Politician	G
Clark Moore	b. 1991	American	Actor	G
Darnell L. Moore	b. 1976	American	Writer, activist	G
Frank C. Moore	1953–2002	American	Painter, designer of the AIDS ribbon	G
Marcel Moore	1892–1972	French	Illustrator, designer, photographer	L
Paul Moore Jr.	1919–2003	American	Episcopal bishop	G
Perry Moore	1971–2011	American	Screenwriter, director	G
Steve Moore	1954–2014	American	Comedian	G
Shani Mootoo	b. 1958	Irish-born Trinidadian-Canadian	Author, multimedia artist, painter, video producer	L
Cherríe Moraga	b. 1952	American	Writer, feminist activist, poet, essayist, playwright	L
Natalie Morales	b. 1985	American	Actor	L
Rodolfo Morales	1925–2001	Mexican	Painter	G
Ricardo Morán	b. 1974	Peruvian	TV and theatre producer and director	G
Sandra Morán	b. 1960	Guatemalan	Politician; 1st openly LGBT person elected to Guatemala's national legislature	L
Trevor Moran	b. 1998	American	Singer, YouTube personality	G
Rauda Morcos	b. 1974	Palestinian	LGBT activist	L
Ethan Mordden	b. 1947	American	Author, musical theater researcher	G
Lauren Morelli	b. 1982	American	Producer, screenwriter	L
Dominick Moreno	b. ?	American	Politician	G
Pitoy Moreno	1925–2018	Filipino	Fashion designer	G
Chloë Grace Moretz	b. 1997	American	Actor	L
Edwin Morgan	1920–2010	Scottish	Poet	G
Mary C. Morgan	b. ?	American	1st openly lesbian judge in California and the United States	L
Michael Morgan	1957–2021	American	Conductor	G
Stephen Morgan	b. 1989	American	TV personality	G
Eiki Mori	b. 1976	Japanese	Photographer	G
Dany Morin	b. 1985	Canadian	Politician	G
Polo Morín	b. 1990	Mexican	Actor, model	G
Mathilde de Morny	1863–1944	French	Noblewoman, artist	L
César Moro	1903–1956	Peruvian	Artist, poet	G
Chris Morris	b. 1979	English	Activist, journalist	G
Jim Morris	1935–2016	American	Bodybuilder	G
Julian Morris	b. 1983	English	Actor	G
Mark Morris	b. 1956	American	Choreographer	G
Maren Morris	b. 1990	American	Country singer	B
Paul Morris	b. ?	American	Porn director, producer	G
Violette Morris	1893–1944	French	Athlete, Nazi collaborator	L
Rachel Morrison	b. 1978	American	Cinematographer	L
Terry Morrison	b. ?	American	Politician	G
Alex Morse	b. 1989	American	Politician; mayor of Holyoke, Massachusetts	G
Erwin Mortier	b. 1965	Belgian	Writer, poet	G
Mentona Moser	1874–1971	German-Swiss	Social worker, communist functionary, writer	L
Daniel David Moses	b. 1952	Canadian	Writer	G
Adam Moss	b. ?	American	Magazine editor	G
Jon Moss	b. 1957	English	Musician	B
Marlow Moss	1889–1958	English	Artist	L
Gili Mossinson	b. 1978	Israeli	Basketball player	B
Luiz Mott	b. 1946	Brazilian	Researcher, anthropologist, historian, LGBT rights activist	G
Bruce Mouat	b. 1994	Scottish	Curler	G
Bob Mould	b. 1960	American	Rock musician (Hüsker Dü, Sugar)	G
Lord Ivar Mountbatten	b. 1963	British	Nobleman	G
Federico Moura	1951–1988	Argentine	Singer, musician (Virus)	G
Yariv Mozer	b. 1978	Israeli	Film producer, screenwriter, film director	G
Brane Mozetič	b. 1958	Slovenian	Poet, translator, essayist	G
Jason Mraz	b. 1977	American	Singer-songwriter	B
Michael Mronz	b. 1967	German	Sports and events manager	G
Frank Mugisha	b. 1979	Ugandan	LGBT rights advocate	G
Thierry Mugler	1948–2022	French	Fashion designer	G
Nico Muhly	b. 1981	American	Composer, arranger	G
Zanele Muholi	b. 1972	South African	Photographer	L
Zoltán Mujahid	b. 1979	Pakistani-Hungarian	Pop singer	G
Manuel Mujica Lainez	1910–1984	Argentine	Novelist, essayist, art critic	B
Sofía Mulánovich	b. 1983	Peruvian	Surfer	L
Helene von Mülinen	1850–1924	Swiss	Feminist activist, suffragette	L
Megan Mullally	b. 1958	American	Actor	B
Johannes von Müller	1752–1809	Swiss	Historian	G
Nadine Müller	b. 1985	German	Discus thrower	L
Nina Müller (née Wörz)	b. 1980	German	Handball player	L
Susann Müller	b. 1988	German	Handball player	L
Ulrike Müller	b. 1971	Austrian	Artist	L
Lars Müller-Marienburg	b. 1977	German-Austrian	Evangelical Lutheran clergyman	G
Murathan Mungan	b. 1955	Turkish	Author, poet	G
Carmen Muñoz	b. ?	Costa Rican	Politician	L
Henry R. Muñoz III	b. 1959	American	Activist	G
Javier Muñoz	b. ?	American	Actor, singer	G
José Esteban Muñoz	1967–2013	American	Academic, theorist	G
Manuel Muñoz	b. 1972	American	Writer	G
Ona Munson	1903–1955	American	Actor	L
Neculai Munteanu	b. 1941	Romanian	Anti-communist dissident	G
Mirjam Müntefering	b. 1969	German	Writer	L
Alex Munter	b. 1968	Canadian	Politician, journalist	G
Bashar Murad	b. 1993	Palestinian	Musician	G
Maki Muraki	b. 1974	Japanese	LGBT activist	L
Alan Muraoka	b. 1962	American	Actor	G
Zeki Müren	1931–1996	Turkish	Singer, composer, songwriter, actor, poet	G
F. W. Murnau	1888–1931	German	Director	G
Alan Murphy	1953–1989	English	Guitarist (Level 42), session musician (Kate Bush, Go West, Mike + The Mechanics)	G
Diane Murphy	b. 1964	American	Actor	L
Peter Murphy	b. 1949	American	Politician	G
Ryan Murphy	b. 1966	American	Writer, director	G
Douglas Murray	b. 1979	English	Author, journalist, political commentator	G
Ed Murray	b. 1955	American	Politician	G
Glen Murray	b. 1957	Canadian	Politician	G
Hannah Murray	b. 1989	English	Actor	B
Herbert Muschamp	1947–2007	American	Architecture critic	G
Tharon Musser	1925–2009	American	Lighting designer	L
Max Mutchnick	b. 1965	American	TV producer	G
Julie Mutesasira	b. 1978	Ugandan	Gospel singer	L
Mwanga II of Buganda	1868–1903	Bugandan	King	G
Kawira Mwirichia	1986–2020	Kenyan	Artist, curator	L
Kushaba Moses Mworeko	b. 1979	Ugandan	LGBT rights activist	G
mxmtoon	b. 2000	American	Singer-songwriter, YouTube personality	B
Zygmunt Mycielski	1907–1987	Polish	Composer, music critic	G
Billie Myers	b. 1971	English	Pop musician	B
Chris Myers	b. 1965	American	Politician	B
Eileen Myles	b. 1949	American	Poet	L

== See also ==
- List of gay, lesbian or bisexual people
