= Billy Masters (columnist) =

American comedian (born 1969)

Billy Masters (born February 13, 1969, in Somerville, Massachusetts) is best known as an openly gay gossip columnist whose work is syndicated to gay and alternative publications around the United States. In 1995, his column (originally called "Filth2Go") appeared in Odyssey Magazine, San Francisco. Within three months, it was in over 20 publications, marking the first time a columnist was syndicated in gay papers. By 1998, he started the website Filth2Go.com which routinely was ranked in the top 100,000 websites around the world (according to Alexa.com). In 2005, the column became known simply as "Billy Masters" and the website was rechristened as www.BillyMasters.com.

Masters' style is more light hearted and comedic than most gossip columnists. However, he has broken a number of stories that have been picked up by mainstream publications, including many reports of actors who have appeared in gay porn (Simon Rex, for example). Faye Dunaway has been a frequent target with a feature Billy calls "Fayewatch" - usually chronicling her diva demands and misdeeds. Masters is often quoted on Page Six of the New York Post, and is frequently featured in such publications as People, Entertainment Weekly, The Village Voice, Us Weekly, Playbill, etc. He is a regular guest on radio and television talk shows, getting his start on the Joan Rivers Show, People Are Talking (Tom Bergeron), and Live with Regis and Kathie Lee.

As a performer, Masters acts, sings and does stand-up. He often donates his time to a variety of charities and benefits, including many gay pride celebrations and AIDS Benefits. The Internet Movie Database lists him as an actor in the film The Brinks Job and the television series Spenser: For Hire. He's also featured in hereTV's World AIDS Day Special, We're Here To Remember. In 2004, he filmed two talk show pilots, The Billy Masters Show and Deep Dish, both of which are listed as in development. And in 2006, he appeared as a celebrity judge alongside Chi Chi LaRue and Bruce Vilanch in All Worlds Studio's Fucking with the Stars.

Masters keeps busy as a stand-up comedian and has opened for a variety of other comedians and musical acts, including Taylor Dayne, George Michael, Tiffany, Joan Rivers, the Pointer Sisters, Joy Behar, Eartha Kitt, and Grace Jones.

He often refers to Joan Rivers not only as his strongest influence, but as a comedic mentor. In an interview, he said: "Joan Rivers was my first real guide, my comedic godmother. She told me if you bomb, get back up on that stage. If you can't get back up there, then you didn't deserve to be there in the first place. That, and she taught me to be very careful about swearing for a laugh. Take the swear out of the joke, she said. If you can still get a laugh, then it's funny. If you need the swear to get the laugh, the joke stinks!"

In May 2008, Billy Masters performed a limited run of "Going Out On A Limb: Confessions of a Hollywood Insider" at Chicago's Bailiwick Repertory Theatre. At the time, Billy was in Chicago for the Grabby Awards and International Mr . Leather.

In April 2020, in the midst of the COVID-19 pandemic, Masters launched "Billy Masters LIVE", a twice weekly online talk show. It streams live on Tuesdays and Thursdays at 3PM Eastern on his YouTube Channel, Billy Masters TV. During the first three weeks, his guests have included Fran Drescher, Jenifer Lewis, Charles Busch, Steve Kmetko, Andrea Martin, Marc Shaiman, Bruce Vilanch, Lainie Kazan, and many others. On Facebook, Billy responded to one fan, "I realize this might as well be called 'Billy Masters and Friends', because the only people I've had on are people I have a personal relationship with and absolutely love. That's probably why it has such a relaxed tone and the guests feel free to talk about things they wouldn't on other shows. The other factor is the chemistry between people. It is really like evesdropping on a group of actual friends." The first season aired live April through December 2020 on Tuesdays and Thursdays at 3PM Eastern / Noon Pacific. The season consisted of 75 original episodes. The season one finale of Billy Masters LIVE aired on December 29, 2020, and included some of the most popular guests of the season as well as some of the most outrageous clips. That show has been seen by over 20K people.

Season two of Billy Masters LIVE premiered on February 11, 2021, with Melissa Manchester. For this season, shows are scheduled for Thursdays, with the occasional special Tuesday episode (Billy has another project that he is working on which has not yet been named).
