= Bodi =

Bodi may refer to:

- Bodinayakkanur, town in Tamil Nadu, India
- Bodi, Benin
- Bodi White, Louisiana politician
- The Bodi people of Ethiopia
- SAP BusinessObjects Data Integrator, software
- The protagonist from the animated film Rock Dog
- Alternative name for asparagus bean in Trinidad and Tobago
- The Beachbody Company which trades as BODi

== See also ==
- Bode (disambiguation)
  - Bode (surname)
- Bodey, a surname
- Bodhi (disambiguation), in Buddhism
- Bodie (disambiguation)
- Body (disambiguation)
