= Bode =

Bode may refer to:

== People ==
- Bode (surname)
- Bode (given name)

== Geography ==
- Böde, Hungary, a village
- Bode, Nepal, a city
- Bodé, Senegal, a settlement
- Bode, Iowa, United States, a city
- Bode (river), a major river in Saxony-Anhalt, Germany
  - Bode Gorge, part of the Bode river valley
- Bode (Wipper), a small river in Thuringia, Germany
- Bode Nunataks, Princess Elizabeth Land, Antarctica

== Other ==
- Bode Museum, Berlin
- Bode (crater), a lunar crater
- Bode Akuna, a character in the video game Star Wars Jedi: Survivor
- Bode Locke, a character in the television series Locke & Key
- BODE index (Body-mass index, airflow Obstruction, Dyspnea, and Exercise), a medical scoring system and capacity index
- Bode plot, a type of graph used in electrical engineering and control theory
- Bode (fashion brand), American clothing company
- Bode xtraction, a type and brand of DNA extraction

== See also ==
- Bodie (disambiguation)
- Bodhi (disambiguation)
