= Bod =

BOD or bod may refer to:

== People ==
- Péter Bod (1712–1768), Hungarian theologian and historian
- Péter Ákos Bod (born 1951), Hungarian politician and economist
- Rens Bod (born 1965), professor in digital humanities and history of humanities at the University of Amsterdam
- Brian O'Driscoll (born 1979), Irish rugby player nicknamed "BOD"
- Bod Mellor, British painter born Dawn Mellor in 1970

== Places and structures ==
- Bod, Brașov, a commune in Romania
- Bod, the native name of Tibet
- Bőd, the Hungarian name for Bediu village, Nușeni Commune, Bistriţa-Năsăud County, Romania
- Böd of Gremista, an ancient Shetland fishing booth

== Science and technology ==
- Breakover diode, a gateless thyristor triggered by avalanche current
- Bilirubin oxidase, an enzyme
- Biochemical oxygen demand or "biological oxygen demand", a measure of organic pollution in a wastewater sample

== Codes ==
- Bodmin Parkway railway station, National Rail station code BOD, a railway station in Cornwall, UK
- Bordeaux–Mérignac Airport, IATA code BOD, an airport serving Bordeaux, France
- bod, ISO 639-3 and -2 language codes for Lhasa Tibetan

== Other uses ==
- Banco Occidental de Descuento, a Venezuelan bank
- Board of directors, a group of people who jointly supervise the activities of an organization
- Board of Deputies of British Jews
- BOD (psychedelic), a hallucinogenic drug
- Bod (TV series), a BBC children's television series
- Bodleian Library, a research library at the University of Oxford informally referred to as "the Bod"
- Book of Discipline, a Christian denominational book
- Books on Demand, a print-on-demand and self-publishing platform
- Mourvèdre, a grape varietal also known as Bod

== See also ==
- Bonné de Bod (born 1981), South African television presenter and documentary film producer.
- Stefan de Bod (born 1996), South African cyclist
- Lisbeth Bodd (1958–2014), Norwegian performance artist and theatre leader
- Bodh (disambiguation)
- Bodsworth (disambiguation)
- Body (disambiguation)
- Bodish languages, a Sino-Tibetan language grouping, which includes the Tibetic languages
- Bodish-Himalayish languages or Tibeto-Kanauri languages, another Sino-Tibetan language grouping
- East Bodish languages, a Sino-Tibetan language group of Bhutan
