= Bode (surname) =

Bode is a surname. Notable people with the surname include:

- Arnold Bode (1900–1977), German architect, painter, designer and curator
- Boyd Henry Bode (1873–1953), American academic and philosopher
- Bruce Bode, American diabetes specialist
- Christoph Bode (born 1952), German literary scholar
- Dániel Böde (born 1986), Hungarian footballer
- Denise Bode (born 1954), American politician and energy policy expert
- Erin Bode, American singer
- Franz-Josef Bode (born 1951), German Roman Catholic prelate and former bishop
- Georg Heinrich Bode (1802–1846), German classical philologist and translator
- Hannelore Bode (born 1941), German operatic soprano
- Hans-Jürgen Bode (1941–2022), German handball player
- Harald Bode (1909–1987), German engineer and pioneer in the development of electronic musical instruments
- Harold M. Bode (1910–1993), American judge
- Harro Bode (born 1951) is a German sailor and 1976 Olympic champion
- Hendrik Wade Bode (1905–1982), American electrical engineer and inventor
- Jace Bode (born 1987), Australian rules footballer
- Jana Bode (born 1969), German luger
- Johann Elert Bode (1747–1826), German astronomer
- Johann Joachim Christoph Bode (1731–1793), German translator of literary works
- John Ernest Bode (1816–1874), English Anglican priest, educator, poet and hymnist
- Johnny Bode (1912–1983), Swedish singer and composer
- Jörg Bode (footballer) (born 1969), German footballer
- Jörg Bode (politician) (born 1970), German politician, former Minister for Economics, Labour and Transport and former Deputy Prime Minister of Lower Saxony
- Ken Bode (1939–2022), American television host, journalist, dean and professor
- Lucian Bode (born 1974), Romanian politician, former Minister of Internal Affairs and former Minister for Transport, Information and Communications
- Marco Bode (born 1969), German footballer
- Mary de Bode (died 1812), Englishwoman, German baroness by marriage
- Mary Wills Bode, American 21st century politician
- Matthew Bode (born 1979), Australian rules footballer
- Marissa Bode (born 2000), American actress
- Mark Bodé (born 1963), American cartoonist, son of Vaughn Bodé
- Mary Wills Bode, American politician
- Ralf D. Bode (1941–2001), German-born American cinematographer
- Ridvan Bode (born 1959), Albanian politician and former Minister of Finances and Economy
- Thilo Bode (born 1947), German consumer rights advocate and former CEO of Greenpeace
- Vaughn Bodē (1941–1975), American underground cartoonist and illustrator
- Veronika Bode (born 1972), German politician
- Wilhelm von Bode (1845–1929), German art historian and curator
- Wolfram Bode (1942–2025), German biochemist
