= Karma Deleg Chö Phel Ling =

Buddhist monastery in Hantum, Netherlands

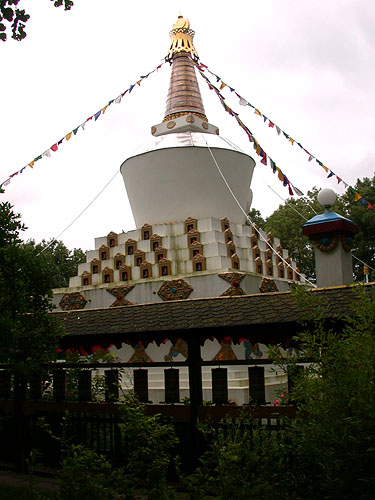
- The stupa of the vihara

- Location within Netherlands

Religion
- Affiliation: Tibetan Buddhism

Location
- Location: Hantum, Friesland
- Country: Netherlands
- Coordinates: 53°21′20″N 5°57′49″E

Architecture
- Founder: Chödje Lama Gawang Rinpoche
- Established: 1986

Karma Deleg Chö Phel Ling is a vihara (a Buddhist monastery) near the Dutch village of Hantum (Friesland) in the Netherlands. The monastery was founded in 1986 by Chödje Lama Gawang Rinpoche.

Since 1991 the complex has its own stupa with a cloister and prayer wheels around it.
