= Antheas Lindius =

Greek poet

Antheas Lindius (Ancient Greek: Ἄνθεας) was a Greek poet, of Lindus in Rhodes, who flourished about 596 BC.

Antheas was one of the earliest known eminent composers of phallic songs, which he himself sung at the head of his phallophori (that is, phallus-bearers). Hence he is ranked by Athenaeus as a comic poet, but this is not precisely correct, since he lived before the period when comedy assumed its proper form. It is observed by the classicist Georg Heinrich Bode, that Antheas, with his komos of phallophori, stands in the same relation to comedy as Arion, with his dithyrambic chorus, to tragedy.
