= Your Body =

Your Body may refer to:

- "Your Body" (Christina Aguilera song), 2012
- "Your Body" (Pretty Ricky song), 2005
- "Your Body", a song by Keith Urban from Ripcord, 2016
- "Your Body", a song by Kylie Minogue and Fernando Garibay, featuring Giorgio Moroder, from Kylie + Garibay, 2015
- "Your Body", a song by Tom Novy, 2004

== See also ==
- Human body
- Body (disambiguation)
