= Kola Ogunwale =

Nigerian politician

Senator 5th National Assembly
- Constituency: Osun Central senatorial district

Personal details
- Occupation: Politician

Felix Kola Ogunwale is a Nigerian politician. He was a senator who represented Osun Central senatorial district in the 5th National Assembly.

== See also ==
- Nigerian senators of the 5th National Assembly
