= Bode Olowoporoku =

Nigerian politician

Senator 5th National Assembly
- Constituency: Ekiti South Senatorial District

Personal details
- Born: 1945
- Died: 2021 (aged 75–76)
- Party: People's Democratic Party (Nigeria) (PDP)
- Education: University of Ife
- Occupation: Politician

Bode Olowoporoku (1945–2021) was a Nigerian politician. He served as the minister of science and technology in the Second Republic and later as a senator representing Ekiti South Senatorial District in 5th National Assembly. He died on March 24, 2021, at the age of 84, after a brief illness.

== Early life and education ==
Olowoporoku was born in 1945 in Ilawe Ekiti, in the Ekiti South Local Government Area of Ekiti State. He pursued his higher education at the University of Ife (now Obafemi Awolowo University), where he earned a degree in economics. He later won a scholarship from the Ford Foundation to study at the University of Manchester, where he obtained a master's degree in economics in 1972. He furthered his academic achievements by earning a doctorate in development economics from the same institution in 1975.

== Political career ==
In 1979, Olowoporoku was appointed commissioner for economic planning and statistics in Ondo State.

In 1983, he became minister of science and technology under President Shehu Shagari. However, his tenure was cut short by the military coup that year.

From 2003 to 2007, Olowoporoku represented Ekiti South Senatorial District in the Nigerian Senate as a member of the People's Democratic Party (PDP).

== Death ==
Olowoporoku died on March 24, 2021, following a brief illness.

== See also ==
- Nigerian senators of the 5th National Assembly
