= Hantum =

- Village
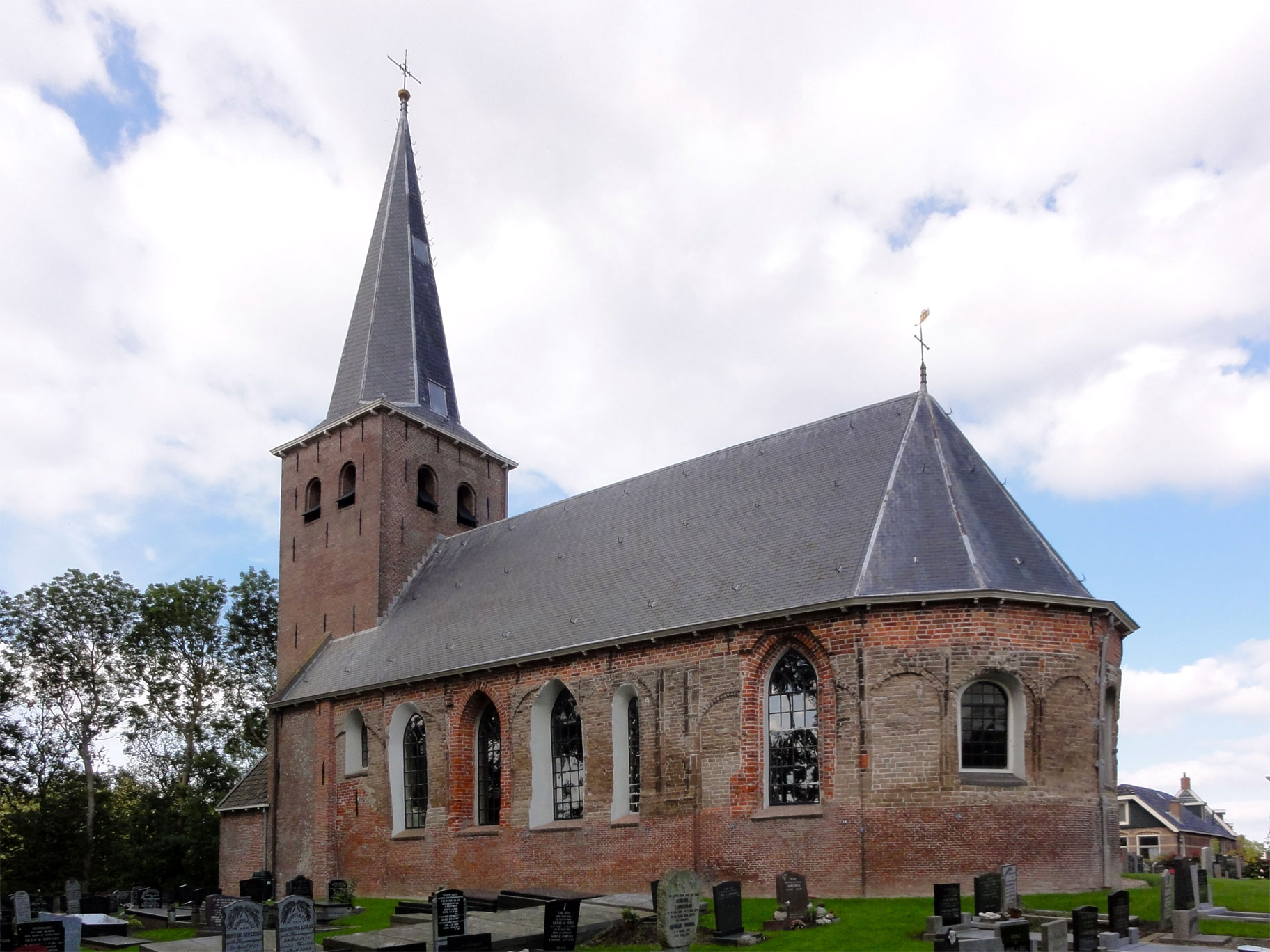
- St Martin's church

- Flag Coat of arms

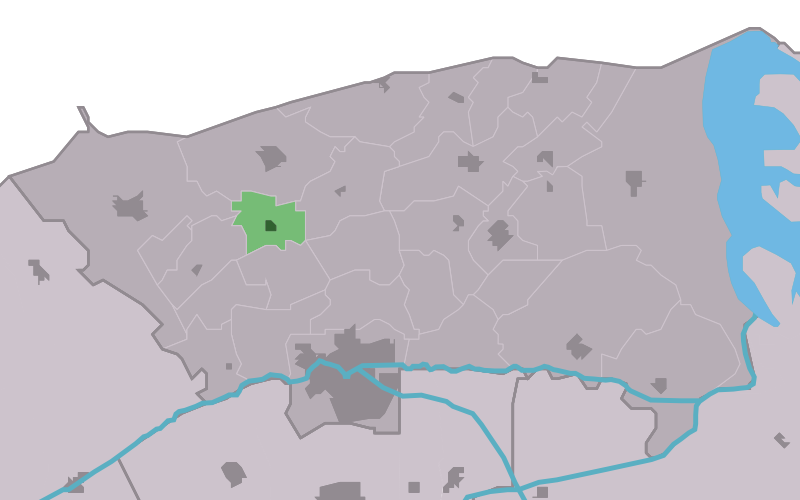
- Location in the former Dongeradeel municipality

- Location in the Netherlands Hantum (Netherlands)
- Country: Netherlands
- Province: Friesland
- Municipality: Noardeast-Fryslân

Area
  - Total: 3.51 km^{2} (1.36 sq mi)
- Elevation: 1 m (3.3 ft)

Population (2021)
  - Total: 400
  - Density: 110/km^{2} (300/sq mi)
- Time zone: UTC+1 (CET)
  - Summer (DST): UTC+2 (CEST)
- Postal code: 9147
- Dialing code: 0519

Hantum is a village in Noardeast-Fryslân in the province of Friesland, the Netherlands. It had a population of around 404 in January 2017. Before 2019, the village was part of the Dongeradeel municipality.

The village is home to a restored windmill, De Hantumermolen, and a Buddhist stupa and monastery.

== History ==
The village was first mentioned in 944 as Hanaten. The etymology is unknown. Hantum is a terp (artificial living mound) village which developed several centuries before Christ. The Dutch Reformed church dates from the late-12th century and was enlarged in the 16th century. In 1807, the tower was built.

The polder mill De Hantumermolen was built in 1880. In 1957, the stock broke and an electromotor was installed. The mill was restored in 1978, and is back in active service removing excess water from the polder.

In 1840, Hamtum was home to 383 people. Around 1900, the southern and western parts of the terp were excavated.

In 1986, Karma Deleg Chö Phel Ling, a Buddhist monastery, was founded. A Buddhist Stupa was built near Hantum in 1993. The stupa measures 13 metres (43 ft), and was at the time the largest stupa in Western Europe. It belongs to the Karma Kagyu lineage of the Tibetan Buddhism, and is part of the monastery of Karma Deleg Chö Phel Ling.

== Gallery ==
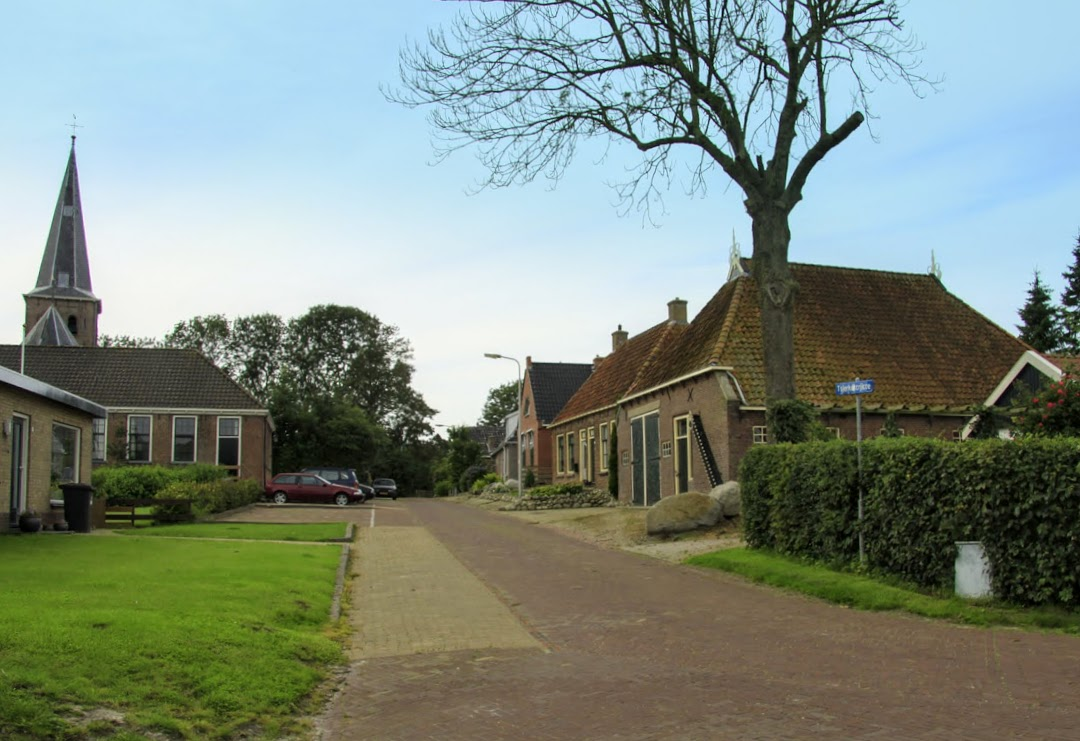
Village view

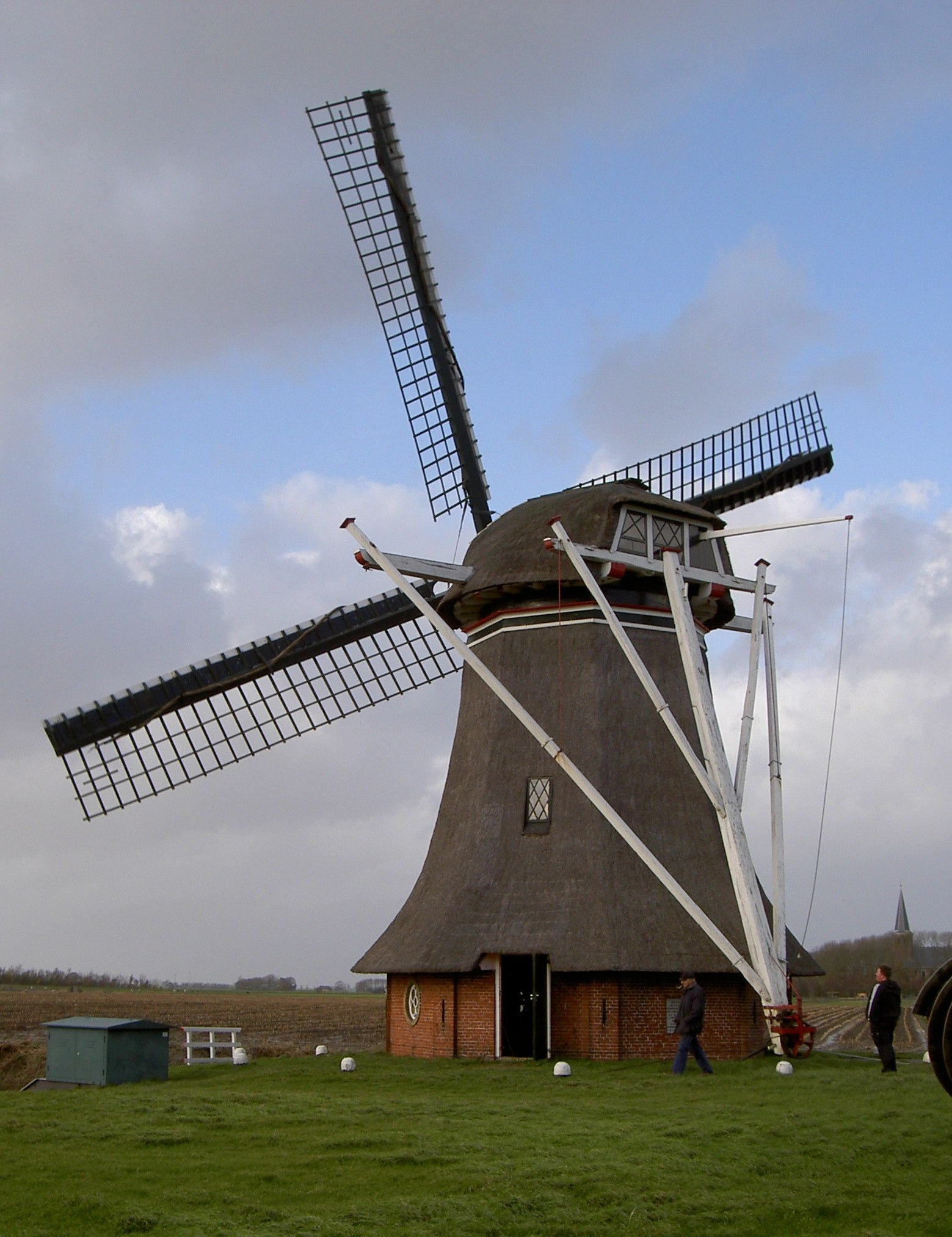
De Hantumermolen

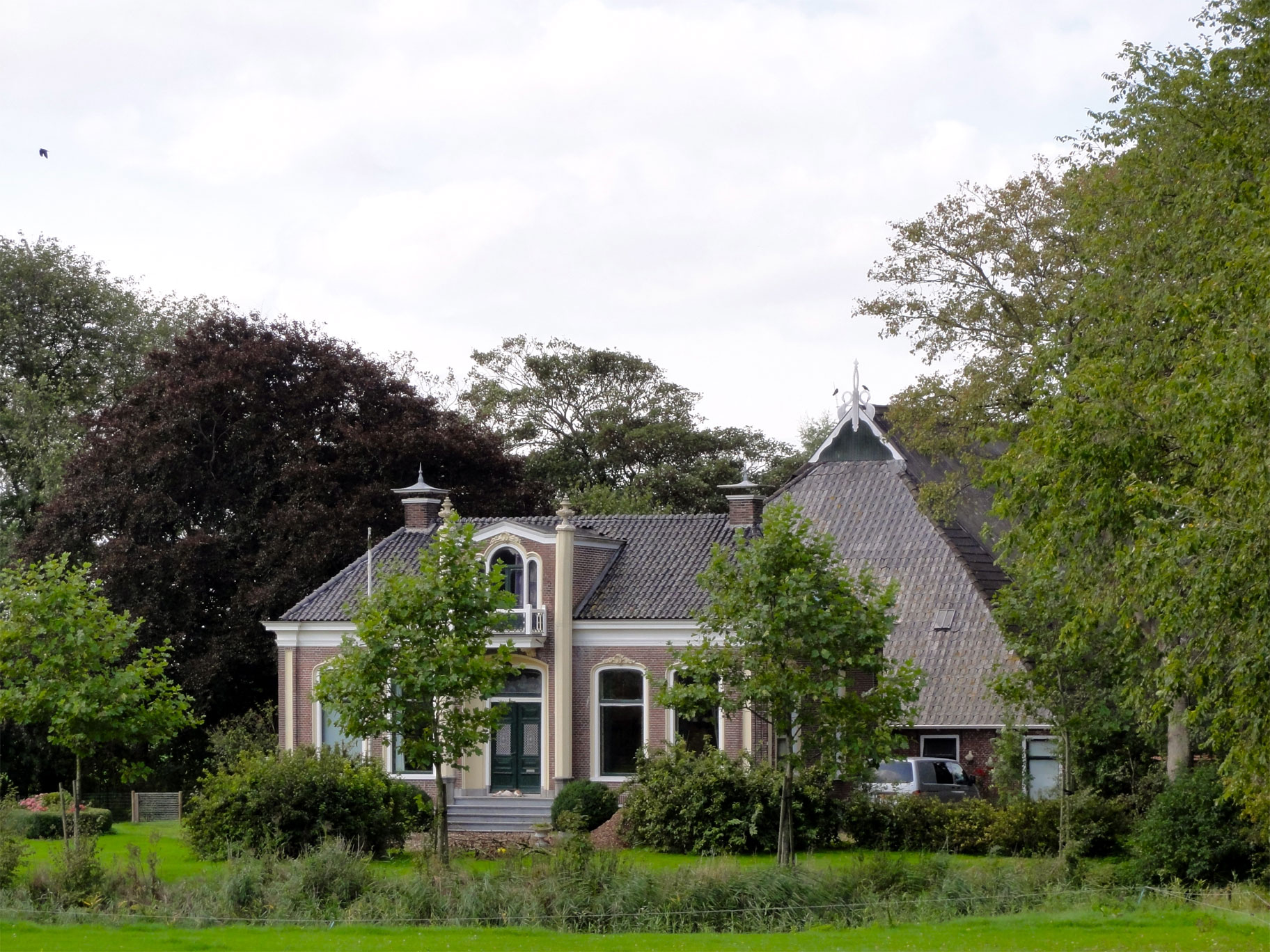
De Kinnema sathe in Hantum

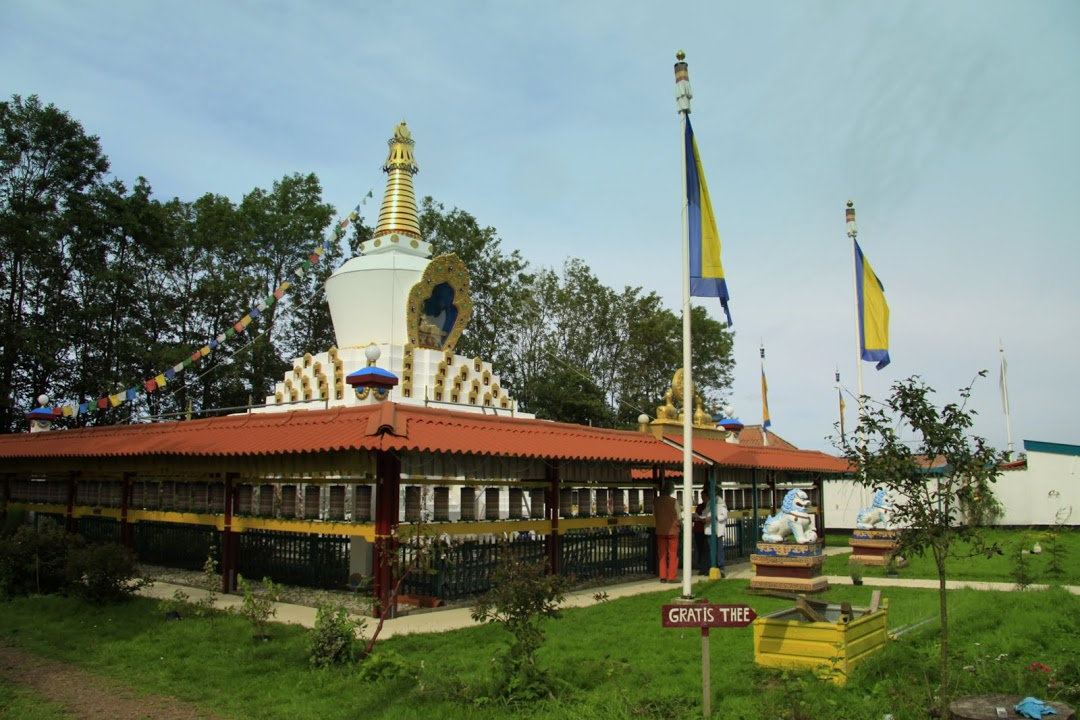
Buddhist stupa in Hantum
