= Remains =

Remains or The Remains may refer to:

== Music ==
- The Remains (band), a 1960s American rock band
- The Ramainz, originally The Remains, a Ramones tribute band

=== Albums ===
- Remains (Alkaline Trio album), 2007
- Remains (Annihilator album), 1997
- Remains (The Only Ones album), 1984
- Remains (Steve Lacy album) or the title song, 1992
- The Remains (album), by the Remains, 1966
- Remains, by Bella Morte, 1997

=== Songs ===
- "Remains" (song), by Maurissa Tancharoen and Jed Whedon, 2009
- "Remains", by Charlotte Church from Three, 2013
- "Remains", by Zola Jesus from Okovi, 2017

== Other uses ==
- Remains (comics), a 2004 comic book series by Steve Niles and Kieron Dwyer
  - Remains (film), a 2011 American horror film based on the comic book series
- The Remains (film), a 2016 American horror film

== See also ==
- Human remains (disambiguation)
- The Remains of the Day (disambiguation)
