= Bodh =

Bodh may refer to:

- Bodh (poem), a Bengali poem by Jibanananda Das
- Bodh people, a community of Himachal Pradesh, India

== People ==
- Bodh Singh Bhagat, Indian politician
- Bodh Raj Sawhney, Indian judge

== See also ==
- Bodhi (disambiguation)
- Buddha (disambiguation)
- Bodha (film), a 2018 Indian crime comedy film
- Bodh Gaya, a city in Bihar, India
- BOHD, a psychedelic drug
- Baudh State, a princely state of India
- Boudh, a town in Orissa, India
- Bod (disambiguation)
