= De Hantumermolen =

Smock mill in Friesland, Netherlands

De Hantumermolen, Hantum
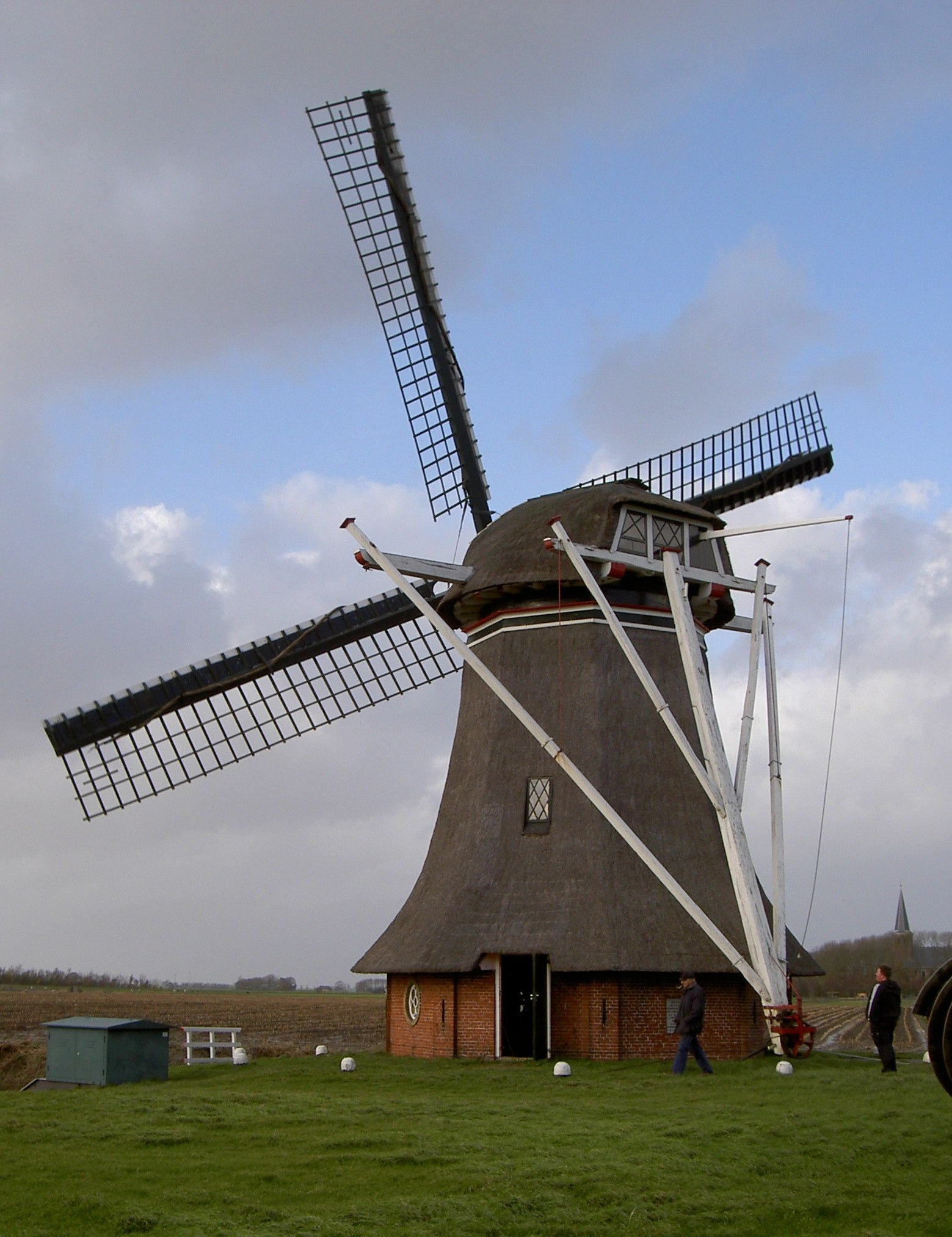
- De Hantumermolen, November 2006

Origin
- Mill name: De Hantumermolen
- Mill location: Stoepawei 19, 9147 BG Hantum
- Coordinates: 53°21′26″N 5°57′47″E
- Operator(s): Stichting Monumentenbeheer Dongeradeel
- Year built: 1880

Information
- Purpose: Drainage mill
- Type: Smock mill
- Storeys: Three-storey smock
- Base storeys: Single-storey base
- Smock sides: Eight sides
- No. of sails: Four sails
- Type of sails: Common sails
- Windshaft: Cast iron
- Winding: Tailpole and winch
- Type of pump: Archimedes' screw

De Hantumermolen is a smock mill in Hantum, Friesland, Netherlands which was built in 1880. The mill has been restored to working order. It is listed as a Rijksmonument, number 38619.

== History ==
De Hantumermolen was built in 1880 by millwright G R van Wierum of Janum. It was built for a group of five owners with the purpose of draining the 100 hectares (250 acres) Huntumerleeg. Circa 1932, the mill was fitted with four Patent sails. The mill was working until 1957 when a stock broke. The mill was then replaced by a pumping station powered by an electric motor. Restorations were undertaken in 1978 and 1994. The Patent sails were replaced with Common sails when the mill was restored in 1978. A further restoration was undertaken in 1998.

== Description ==
De Hantumermolen is a smock mill on a single-storey brick base. The mill is winded by tailpole and winch. The smock and cap are thatched. The sails have a span of 22.00 metres (72 ft 2 in). and are carried on a cast-iron windshaft, which was cast by Prins van Oranje, The Hague. The windshaft also carries the brake wheel which has 63 cogs. This drives the wallower (32 cogs) at the top of the upright shaft. At the bottom of the upright shaft, the crown wheel, which has 43 cogs drives a gearwheel with 44 cogs on the axle of the Archimedes' screw. The axle of the Archimedes' screw is 370 millimetres (1 ft 3 in) diameter. The screw is 1.61 metres (5 ft 3 in) diameter and 4.91 metres (16 ft 1 in) long. It is inclined at 20° and each revolution of the screw lifts 1,172 litres (258 imp gal) of water.

== Public access ==
De Hantumermolen is open by appointment or whenever the mill is working.
