= The Remains of the Day (disambiguation) =

The Remains of the Day is a 1989 novel by Japanese-born British writer Kazuo Ishiguro

The Remains of the Day or Remains of the Day may also refer to:

- The Remains of the Day (film), a 1993 film based on the novel
- The Remains of the Day (musical), a 2010 musical based on the novel
- Remains of the Day (album), a 2010 album by the Finnish alternative rock band End of You
- "Remains of the Day" (song), a song from the 2005 stop-motion film Corpse Bride
- "Remains of the Day", a January 2007 episode from the 17th season of the television series Law & Order

== See also ==
- Remains (disambiguation)
