= Glucommander =

Glucommander is a computer-directed method of inpatient glucose management.

== Development ==
Glucommander's software concept originated from an article published in 1982 by White et al. That article presented a complex set of orders for determining the basal insulin requirements in pediatric patients using an insulin pump.

When data were graphed, it was obvious that a linear regression with an intercept of 60 and a slope, or multiplier, of 0.02 could resolve the complexity of the orders of White et al. to a single formula for calculation of intravenous insulin requirements: (blood glucose − 60) × 0.02 = insulin dose/h. Incorporated into a bedside laptop computer system by Atlanta Diabetes Associates (Paul Davidson, Bruce Bode, and Dennis Steed), the Glucommander concept was later enhanced and commercialized into the Glucommander Plus product by Glytec.

Davidson and Bode now serve as medical advisors to Glytec LLC, Food and Drug Administration (FDA) in June 2006, and again in 2010 for an Enterprise version of the software.

== Usage ==
Glucommander is intended to evaluate the current and cumulative patient blood glucose values, and, based on the aggregate of those measurements, whether one or many, regulate the infusion of I.V. fluids, through an I.V. infusion pump, and drive the blood glucose level towards a predetermined target range. Once that target blood glucose range has been reached, the system's function is to recommend a titration of insulin, glucose, and saline for the purpose of maintaining the patient's blood glucose level in that target range. The system is programmed to provide intravenous dosing of glucose, saline, and insulin, as well as subcutaneous dosing of glucose and insulin.
