= Bode (given name) =

Bode is a masculine given name and nickname which may refer to:

- Bode Abiodun (born 1980), Nigerian table tennis player
- Bode Akindele (1933–2020), Nigerian industrialist and businessman
- Lu Bode (fl. 119 BC–?), Chinese general
- Olabode Bode George (born 1945), Nigerian politician
- Bode Hidalgo (born 2002), American soccer player
- Wilfred Olabode Bode Olajumoke (born 1944), Nigerian politician
- Bode Olowoporoku (1945–2021), Nigerian politician
- Bode Miller (born 1977), American skier
- Bode Prasad (born 1967), Indian politician
- Bode Rhodes-Vivour (born 1951), Nigerian jurist and former justice of the Supreme Court of Nigeria
- Bode Sowande (born 1948), Nigerian writer and dramatist
- Bode Thomas (1918–1953), Nigerian politician
