= Bodie =

Bodie may refer to:

== Places ==
- Bodie, California, a ghost town in Mono County
- Bodie, Washington, a ghost town
- Bodie Hills, a low mountain range in Mono County
- Bodie Island, a barrier peninsula that forms the northernmost portion of the Outer Banks
- Bodie Mine, the patent gold mine which spurred the relocation of Bodie, Washington
- Bodie Mountains, a mountain range in Nevada
- Bodié, a sub-prefecture of Guinea Republic

== People ==
- Damien Bodie (born 1985), Australian actor
- Ping Bodie (1887–1961), Major League Baseball center fielder
- Troy Bodie (born 1985), Canadian hockey player
- Zvi Bodie, Norman and Adele Barron Professor of Management at Boston University
- Bodie Olmos (born 1975), American actor, son of Edward James Olmos and Kaija Keel
- Bodie Thoene (born 1951), coauthor with Brock Thoene of historical fiction
- Bodie Weldon (1895–1928), professional football player during the 1920s
- Bodie (musician) (born 1993), alternative pop and rap/hiphop musician active since 2017

=== Fictional characters ===
- Bodie Broadus, from the HBO drama The Wire
- Cheyenne Bodie, title character of the American television western series Cheyenne (1955 TV series), played by Clint Walker
- William Bodie, on the British television action series The Professionals

== See also ==
- Bode Miller (born 1977), American World Cup alpine ski racer
- Bodhi, a term for enlightenment and sometimes a name
- Bode (disambiguation)
- Bodies (disambiguation)
- Body (disambiguation)
- Brodie, a Scottish surname
