= Bodey =

Bodey is a surname. Notable people with the surname include:

- David Bodey (born 1947), British judge
- George Bodey (died 1930), Australian politician
- Greta Bodey (born 1995), Australian rules footballer
- John Bodey (1549–1583), English Roman Catholic academic jurist and lay theologian
- W. S. Bodey, (1814–1859), American prospector who discovered gold in Eastern California
