= Prayer wheel =

Devotional tool in Buddhism

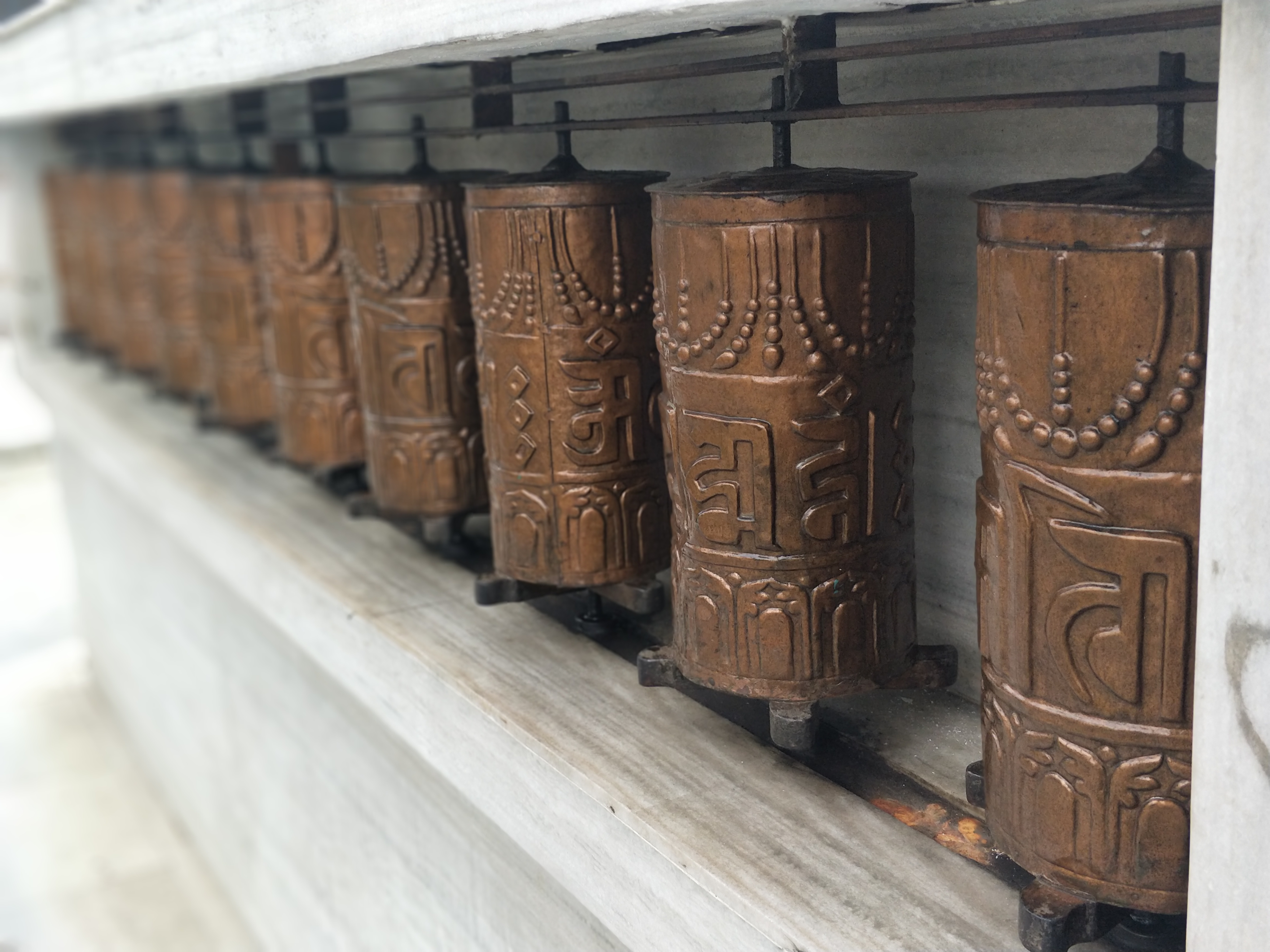
Prayer wheels in Mussoorie, India

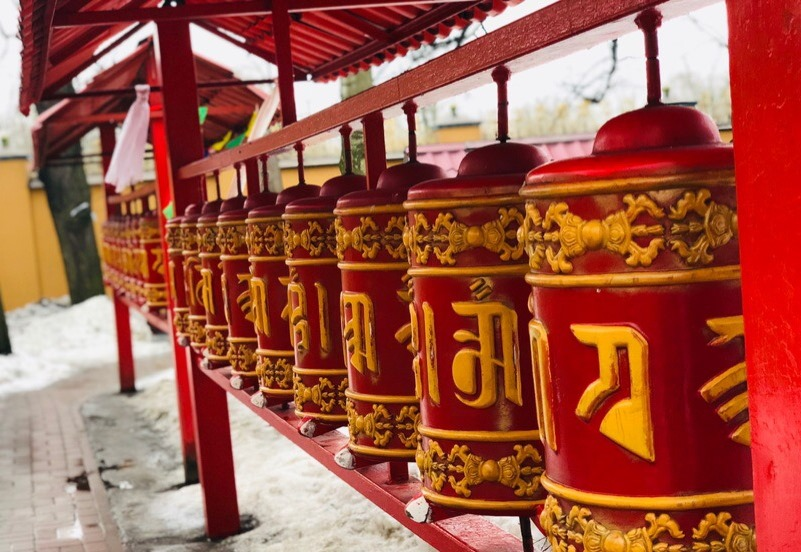
Prayer wheels at the Datsan Gunzechoinei Buddhist temple in St. Petersburg, Russia

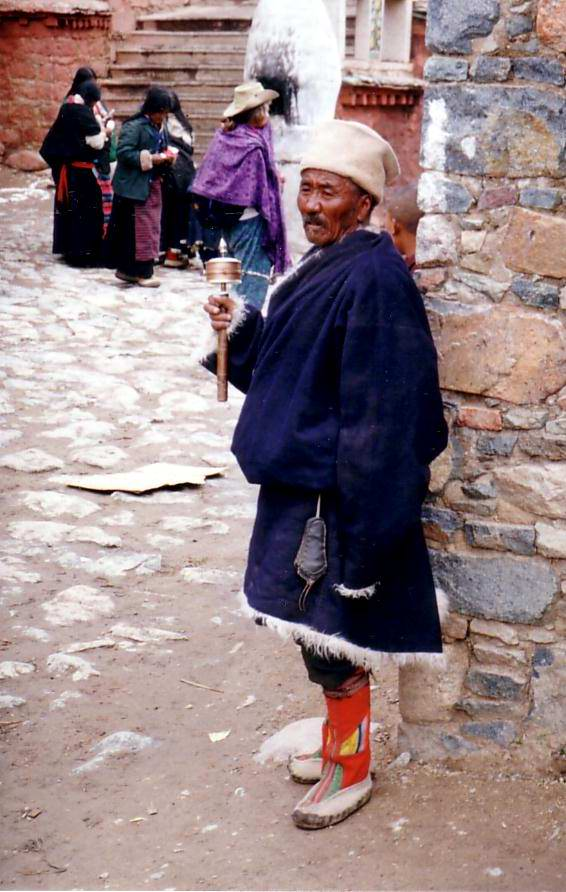
Pilgrim with prayer wheel, Tsurphu Monastery, 1993

A prayer wheel, or mani wheel, is a cylindrical wheel (Tibetan: འཁོར་ལོ།, Wylie: 'khor lo, Oirat: кюрдэ) for Buddhist recitation. The wheel is installed on a spindle made from metal, wood, stone, leather, or coarse cotton. Prayer wheels are common in Tibet and areas where Tibetan culture is predominant.

Traditionally, a mantra is written in Ranjana script or Tibetan script, on the outside of the wheel. The mantra Om mani padme hum is most commonly used, but other mantras can also be used.

Prayer wheels sometimes depict dakinis and the eight auspicious symbols (ashtamangala). At the core of the cylinder, as the axle of the wheel, is a "life tree" made of wood or metal with mantras written on or wrapped around it.

According to the Tibetan Buddhist and Bon tradition, spinning such a wheel will have much the same meritorious effect as orally reciting the prayers.

== Nomenclature and etymology ==
The Tibetan term is a contraction: "mani" itself is a contraction of Sanskrit cintamani; "chos" is Tibetan for dharma; and "'khor" or "'khorlo" means chakrano.

The common term, "prayer wheel" is a double misnomer. A long strip of rolled-up paper bearing printed or inscribed mantras rather than prayers, per se, is inside the cylinder. The term "mantra mill", in contrast to "prayer wheel", is perhaps a better translation of the Tibetan 'khor-lo, since a "mill" refers to a turning process that generates a particular output, in this case generating merit.

== Origins and history ==
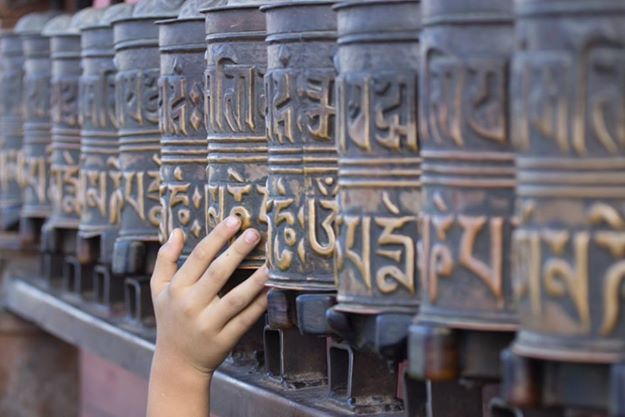
A little boy rolling the prayer wheels at Swayambhunath, Nepal

The first prayer wheels, which are driven by wind, have been used in Tibet and China since the fourth century. The concept of the prayer wheel is a physical manifestation of the phrase "turning the wheel of Dharma", which describes the way in which the Buddha taught.

Historians, such as Ferdinand D. Lessing, have argued that the prayer wheels developed from Chinese revolving bookcases (Chinese: 轉輪藏; pinyin: zhuàn lún zàng), popular among Buddhist monasteries.

According to the Tibetan tradition, the prayer wheel lineage traces back to the famous Indian master, Nagarjuna. Tibetan texts also say that the practice was taught by the Indian Buddhist masters Tilopa and Naropa as well as the Tibetan masters Marpa and Milarepa. Kawaguchi mentions in his book that the prayer wheel originated in the Mani Lhakhang where Je Tsongkhapa invented it.

Prayer wheels originated from 'The School of Shakyamuni sutra, volume 3 – pagoda and temple' which states that:

"those who set up the place for worship, use the knowledge to propagate the dharma to common people, should there be any man or woman who are illiterate and unable to read the sutra, they should then set up the prayer wheel to facilitate those illiterate to chant the sutra, and the effect is the same as reading the sutra"

Another theory is that rotating mantras relate to numerous yogic or Tantric practices whereby the Tantric practitioner visualizes the mantra revolving around his or her nadis and especially around the meridian chakras such as the heart and crown. The prayer wheels are a visual aid for developing the capacity for these types of Tantric visualizations.

== Practice ==
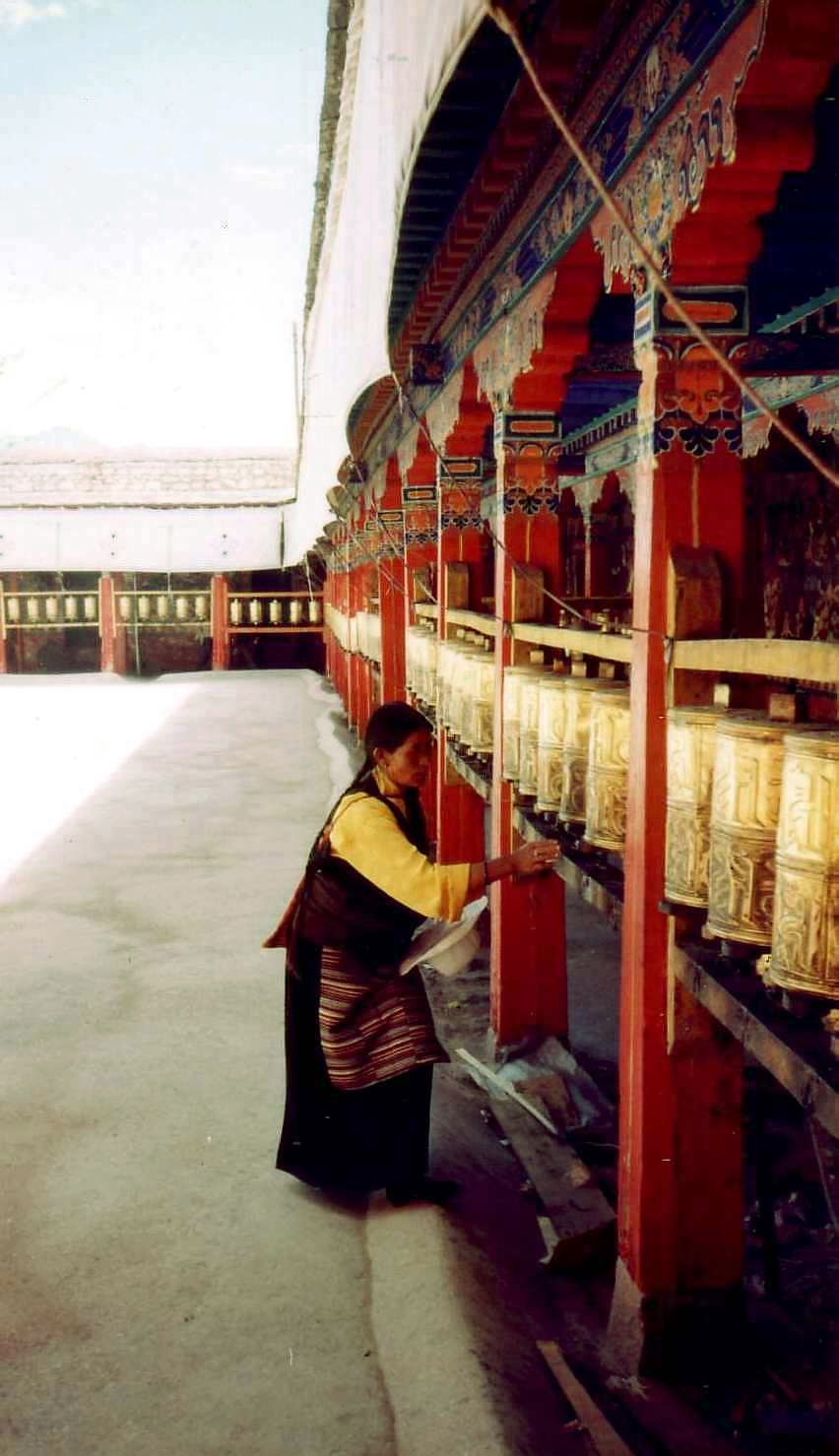
Prayer wheels at Nechung Chok, Lhasa

According to the lineage texts on prayer wheels, prayer wheels are used to accumulate wisdom and merit (good karma) and to purify negativities (bad karma). In Buddhism, buddhas and bodhisattvas have created a variety of skillful means (upaya) to help bring practitioners ever closer to realizing enlightenment. The idea of spinning mantras relates to numerous Tantric practices whereby the Tantric practitioner visualizes mantras revolving around the nadis and especially around the meridian chakras such as the heart and crown. Therefore, prayer wheels are a visual aid for developing one's capacity for these types of Tantric visualizations.

The spiritual method for those practicing with a prayer wheel is very specific (with slight variations according to different Buddhist sects). The practitioner most often spins the wheel clockwise, as the direction in which the mantras are written is that of the movement of the sun across the sky. On rare occasions, advanced Tantric practitioners such as those of Senge Dongma, the Lion-Faced Dakini, spin prayer wheels counterclockwise to manifest a more wrathful protective energy. As the practitioner turns the wheel, it is best to focus the mind and repeat the Om Mani Padme Hum mantra. Not only does this increase the merit earned by the wheel's use, but it is a mind-stabilization technique that trains the mind while the body is in motion. Intoning the mani mantra with mindfulness and the "Bodhicitta" motivation dramatically enhances the effects of the prayer wheel. However, it is said that even turning it while distracted has benefits and merits, and it is stated in the lineage text that even insects that cross a prayer wheel's shadow will get some benefit. Each revolution is as meritorious as reading the inscription aloud as many times as it is written on the scroll, and this means that the more "om mani padme hum" mantras that are inside a prayer wheel, the more powerful it is. It is best to turn the wheel with a gentle rhythm and not too fast or frantically. While turning smoothly, one keeps in mind the motivation and spirit of compassion and bodhichitta (the noble mind that aspires to full enlightenment for the benefit of all beings).

The benefits attributed to the practice of turning the wheel include helping wisdom, compassion and bodhichitta arise in the practitioner and enhancing siddhis (spiritual powers such as clairvoyance, precognition, reading others thoughts, etc.). The practitioner can repeat the mantra as many times as possible during the turning of the wheel, stabilizing a calm, meditative mind. At the end of a practice session, there is a Tibetan Buddhist tradition of dedicating any accumulated merits that one may have gathered during practice to the benefit of all sentient beings, then reciting "om ah hum" three times. This is customary with Tibetans upon completing any Buddhist practice.

Thubten Zopa Rinpoche has commented that installing a prayer wheel has the capacity to completely transform a place, which becomes "...peaceful, pleasant, and conducive to the mind."

Simply touching a prayer wheel is said to bring great purification to negative karmas and obscurations.

== Types ==
=== Human-powered ===
==== Handheld wheels ====
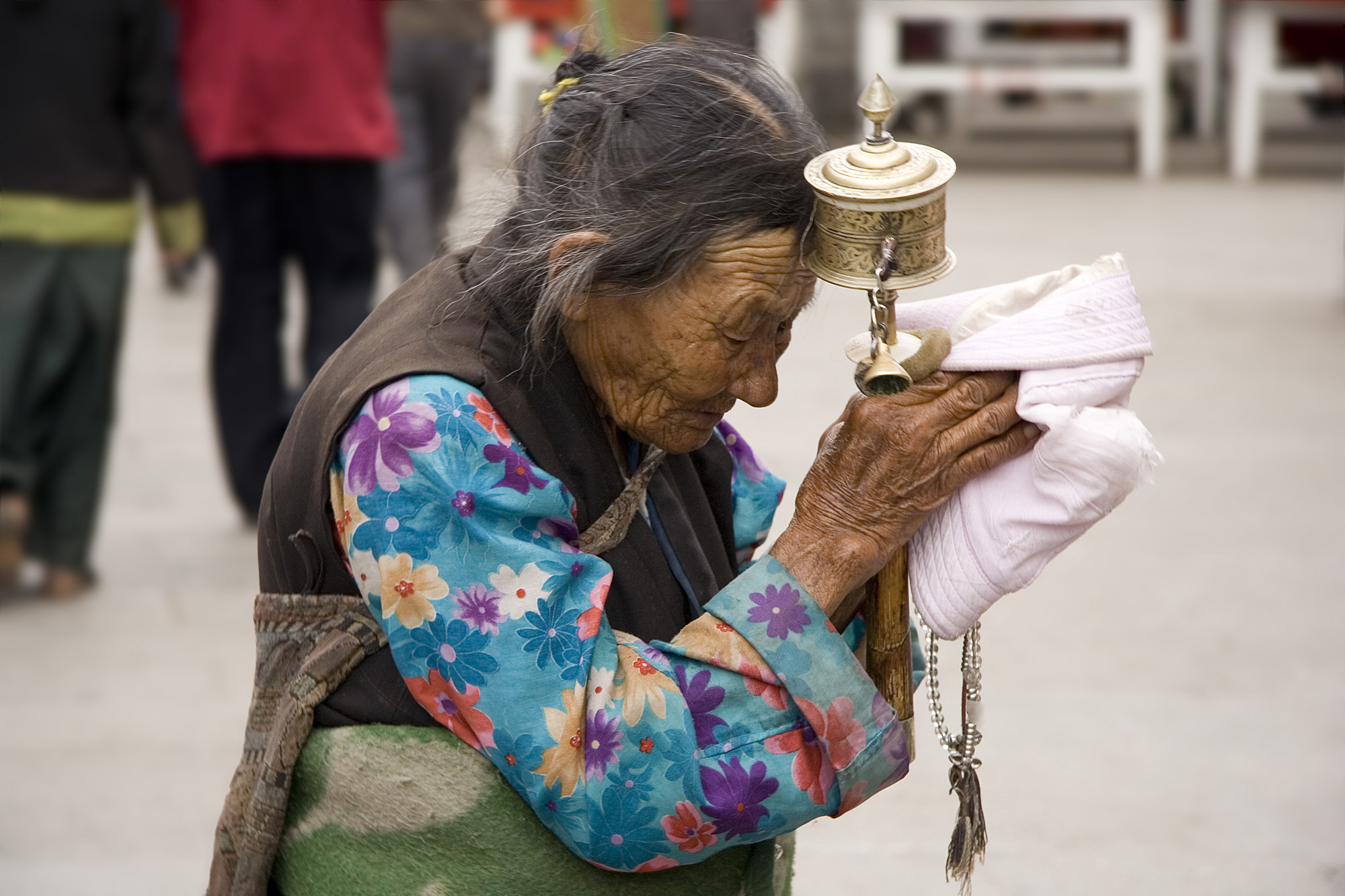
An elderly Tibetan woman with a prayer wheel

The handheld prayer wheel (mani lag 'khor) has a cylindrical, generally sheet-metal body (often beautifully embossed) mounted on a metal shaft or pin set into a wooden or metal handle that turns on a circular bearing commonly made of Turbinella (conch) shell. The cylinder itself is affixed with a cord or chain terminating in a small weight allowing it to be spun by a slight rotation of the wrist. The weighted chain, acting as a governor, stabilizes the wheel and keeps it spinning with less input from the practitioner than would otherwise be the case. When the prayer wheel is spun in prayer, the mantras inside are believe to become potent with the person's intent, allowing the practitioner to accumulate wisdom and merit.

==== Large wheels ====
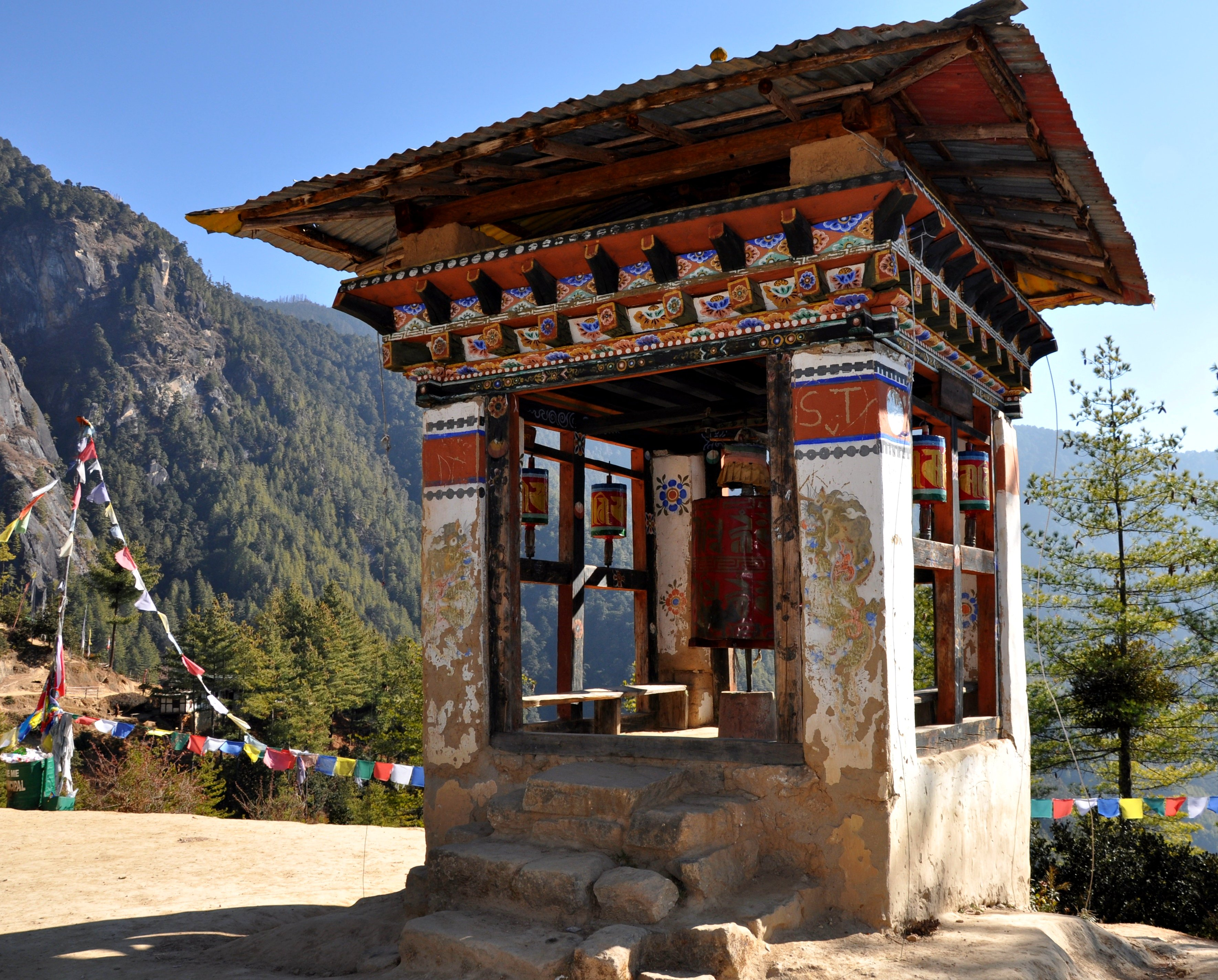
A small prayer wheel shrine housing a large prayer wheel, Paro Taktsang, Bhutan

Prayer wheels larger than human size are to be seen in separate rooms in Tibetan Buddhist temples and can be set in motion by pilgrims. With the help of a small bell the number of revolutions can be counted. The cylinders of fixed prayer wheels are often inscribed with the formula "Om mani padme hum" (meaning "jewel in the lotus") in ornamental Lantsa (Ranjana) letters.

==== Row installations ====
Many monasteries around Tibet have large, fixed, metal wheels set side by side in a row. Passersby can turn the entire row of wheels simply by sliding their hands over each one. They are set in motion by pilgrims who circumambulate the building in a clockwise direction.

=== Powered by other means ===
==== Water wheels ====
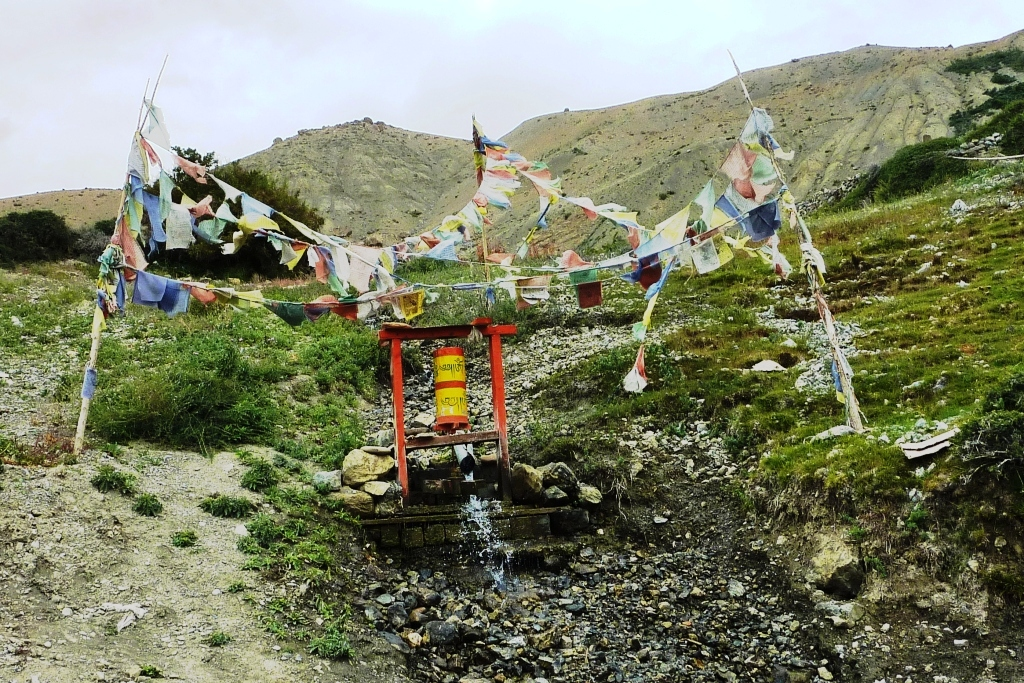
Water-powered prayer wheel, Spiti valley, India

This type of prayer wheel is turned by flowing water. The water that is touched by the wheel is said to become blessed and to carry its purifying power into all life forms in the oceans and lakes that it feeds into.

==== Fire wheels ====
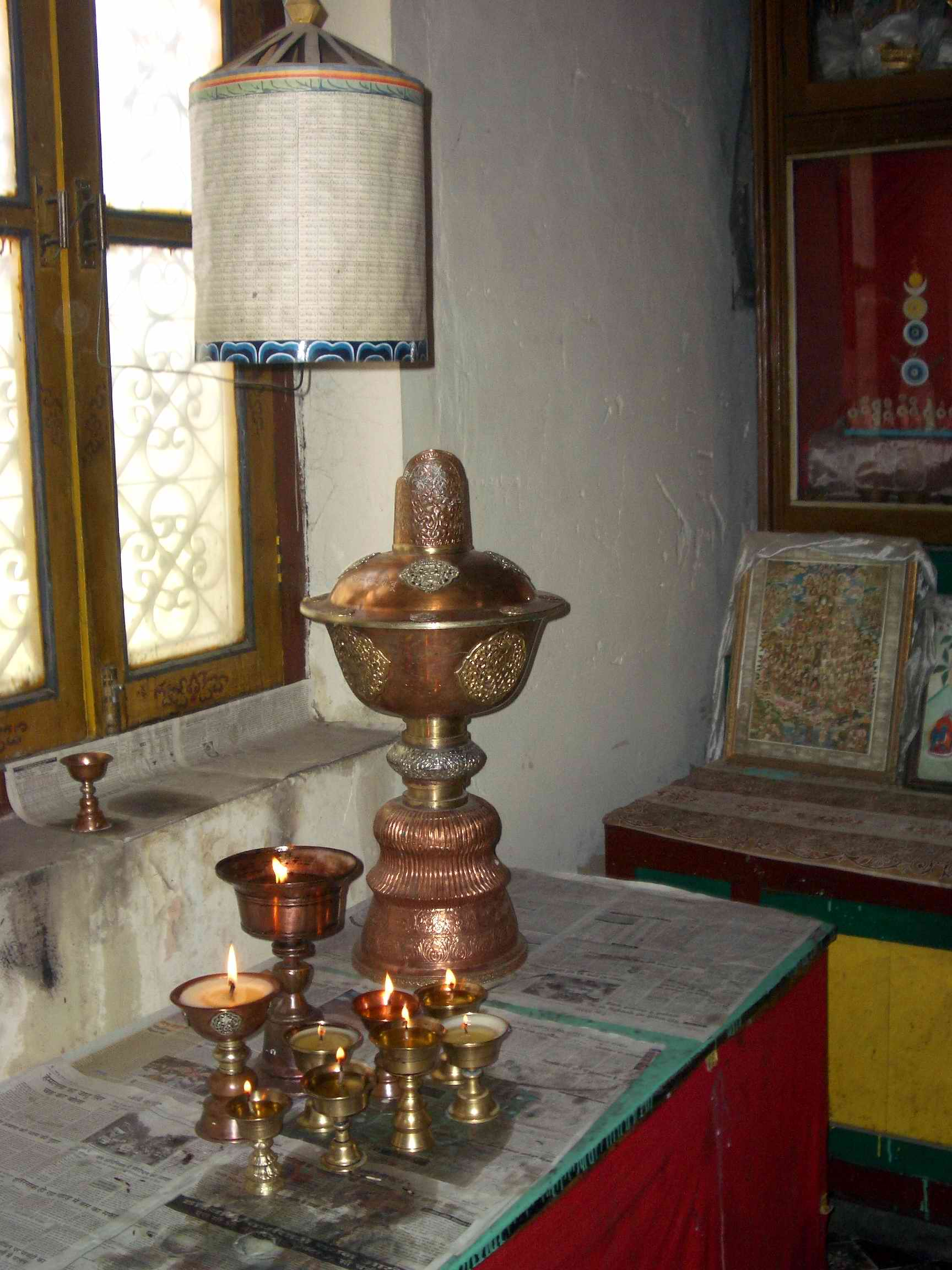
utter-lamp-powered prayer wheel, Manali, India

This wheel is turned by the heat of a candle or electric light. The light emitted from the prayer wheel is believed to purify the negative karmas of the living beings it touches.

==== Wind wheels ====
This type of wheel is turned by wind. The wind that touches the prayer wheel is believed to help alleviate the negative karma of those it touches.

==== Electric dharma wheels ====
Electric prayer wheels at Samye Ling in Scotland, 2009 (8 seconds)

Some prayer wheels are powered by electric motors. Thardo 'khorlo, as these electric wheels are sometimes known, contain one thousand copies of the mantra of Chenrezig and many copies of other mantras. The thardo 'khorlo can be accompanied by lights and music if one so chooses.

Electricity can be considered similar to the above sources of energy (water, fire, wind) for prayer wheels. The merit generated by the prayer wheel is believed to derived from the spiritual power of the dharma texts and mantras, not necessarily the physical power that rotates them. These prayer wheels turn all day, all night, all through the year. The lamas and practitioners who build and maintain the wheels and pay for the electricity are credited with generating and dedicating the merit.

== Gallery ==
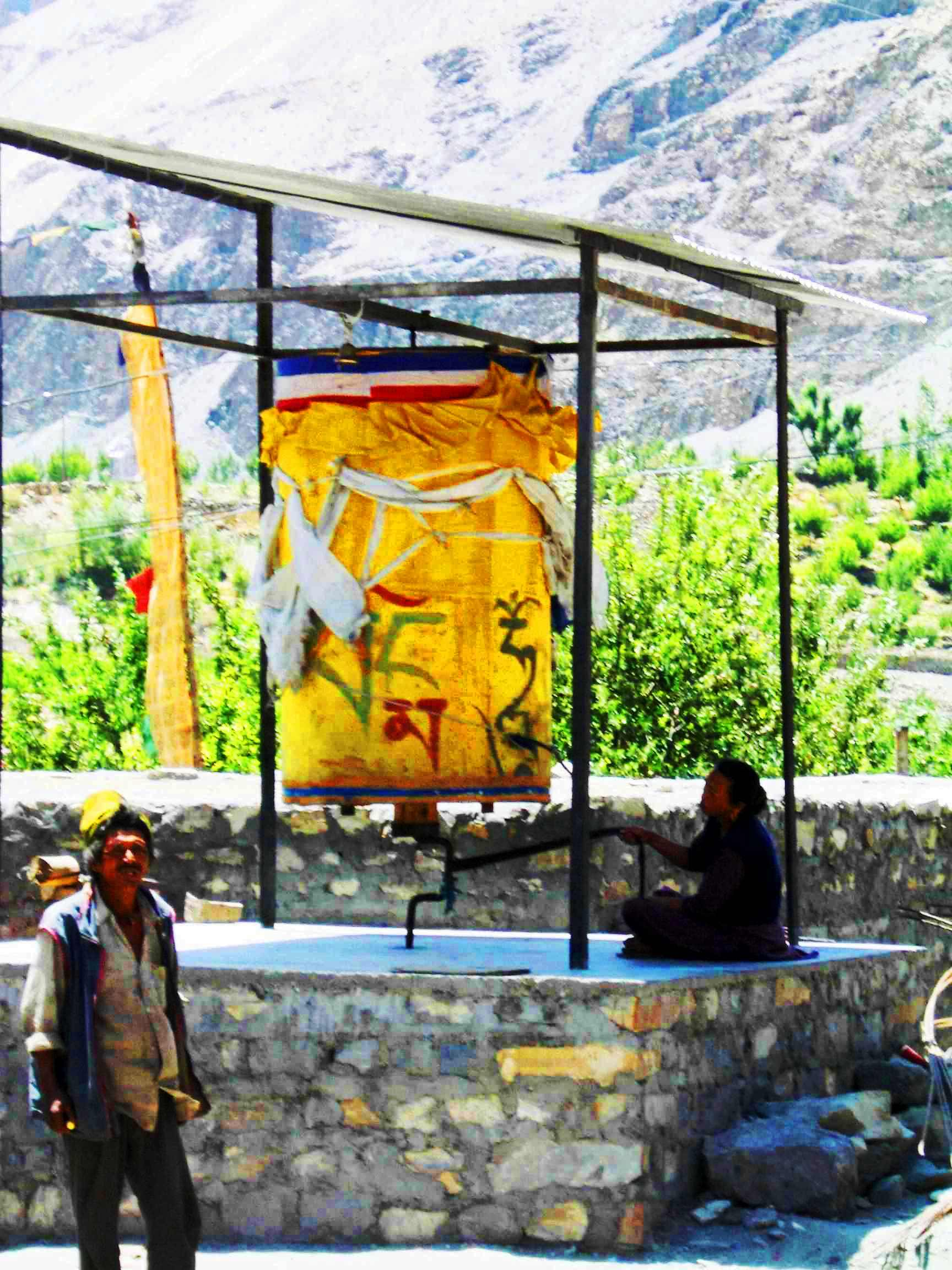
Large prayer wheel being turned. Spiti

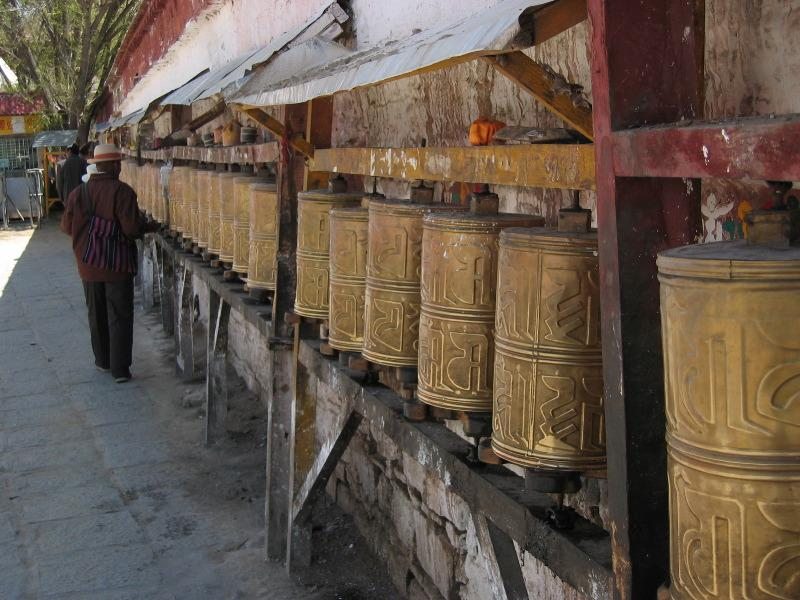
Prayer wheels at Samye Monastery.

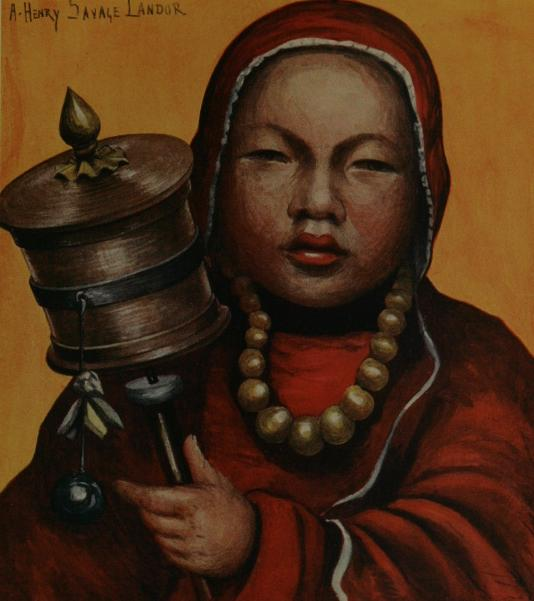
Tibetan child with a prayer wheel

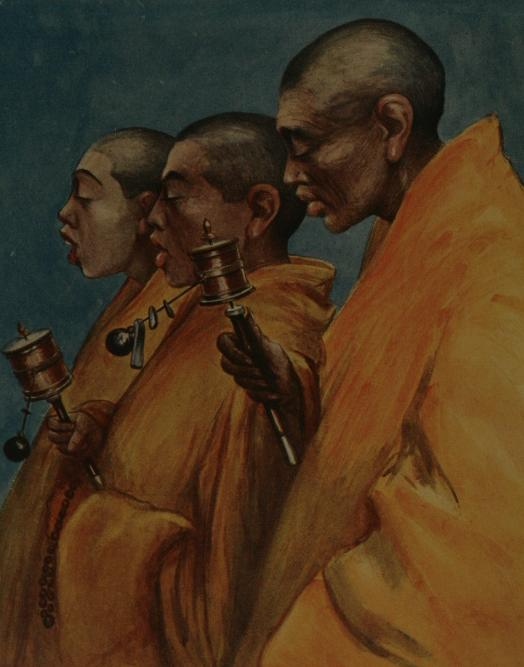
1905 illustration of monks with prayer wheels

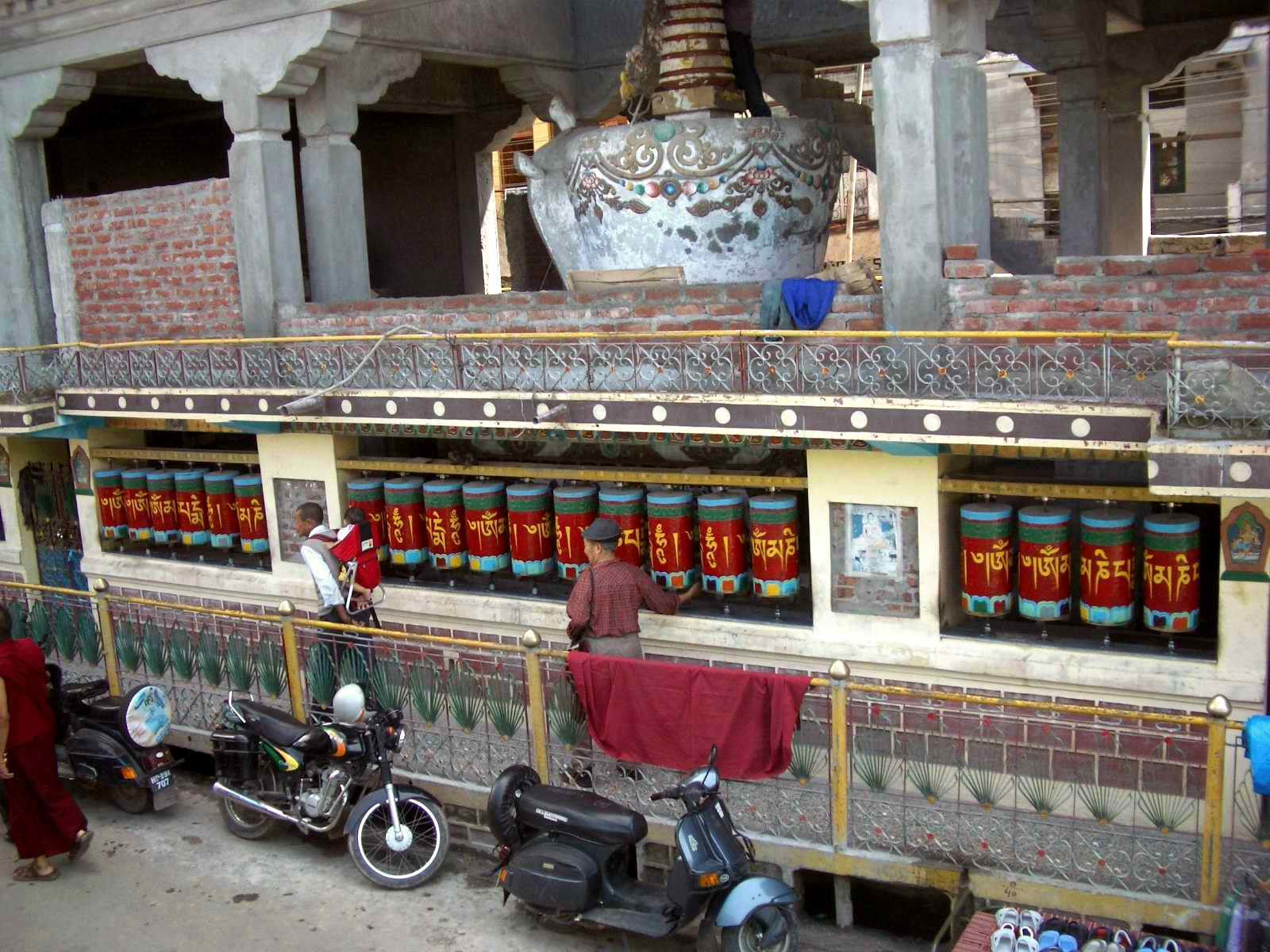
Stupa & prayer wheels. Main street, McLeod Ganj.

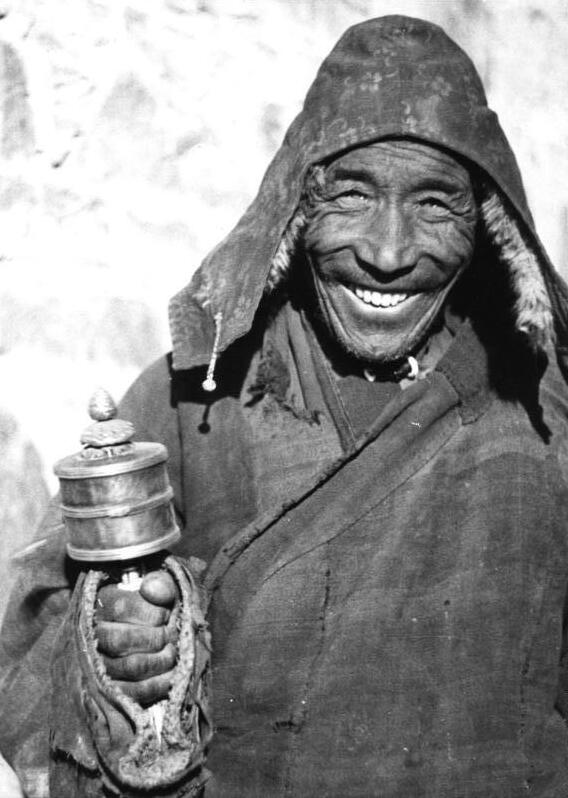
Monk with prayer wheel. 1938

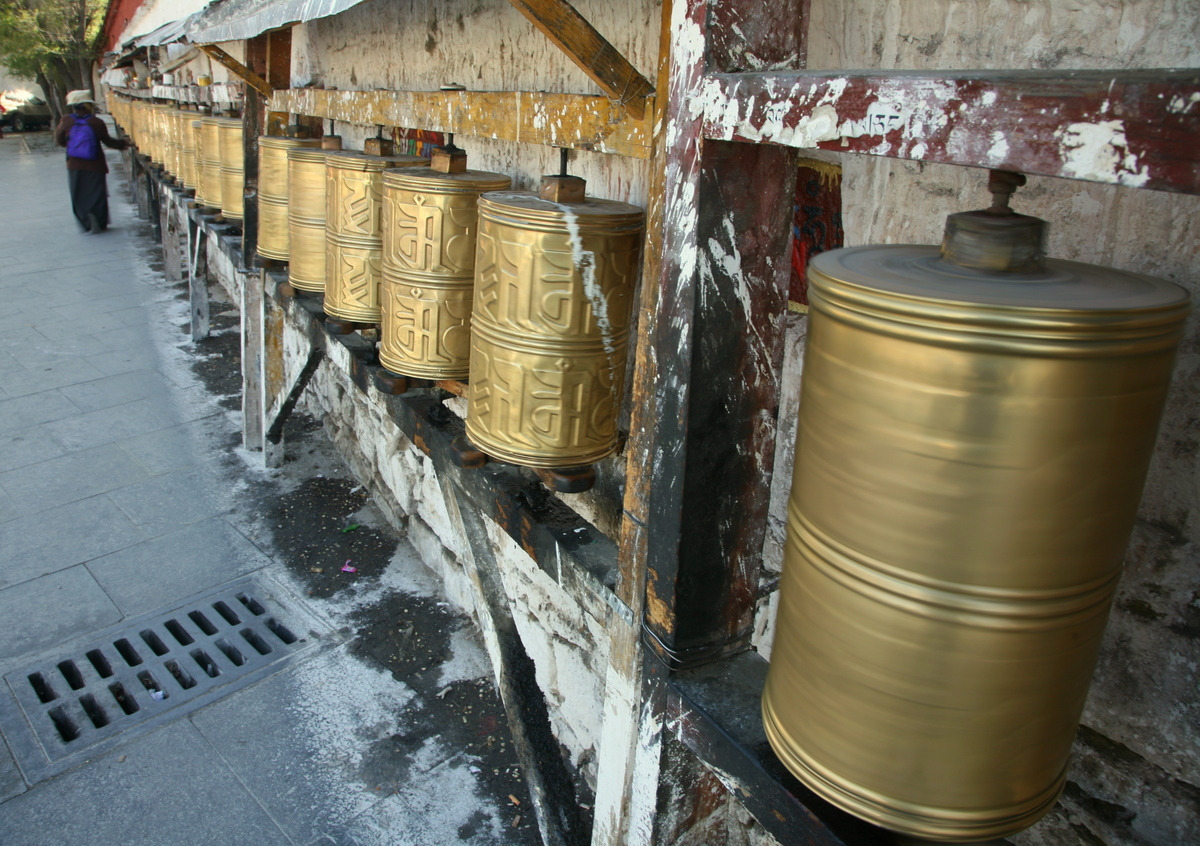
Prayer wheels at the base of the Potala in Lhasa, Tibet.

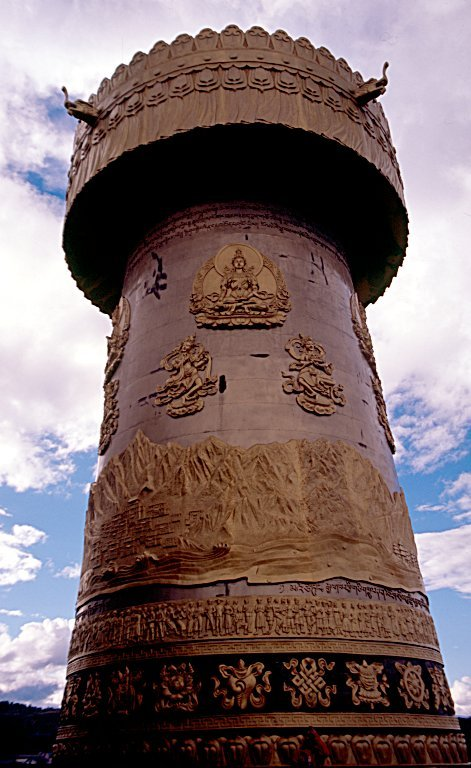
A Prayer wheel at Dukezong Temple in Shangri-La County, Yunnan.

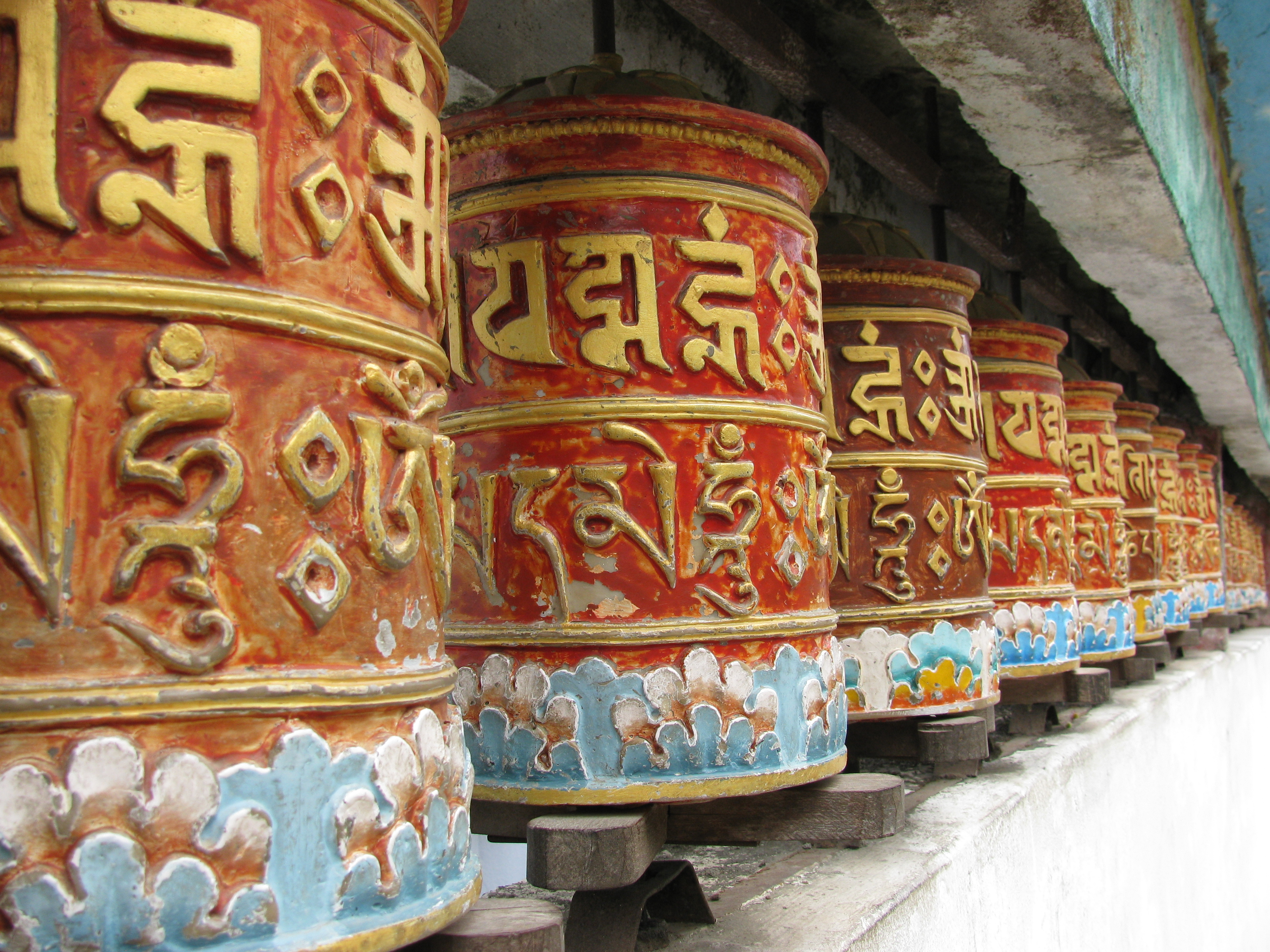
Prayer wheels in the Rumtek Monastery

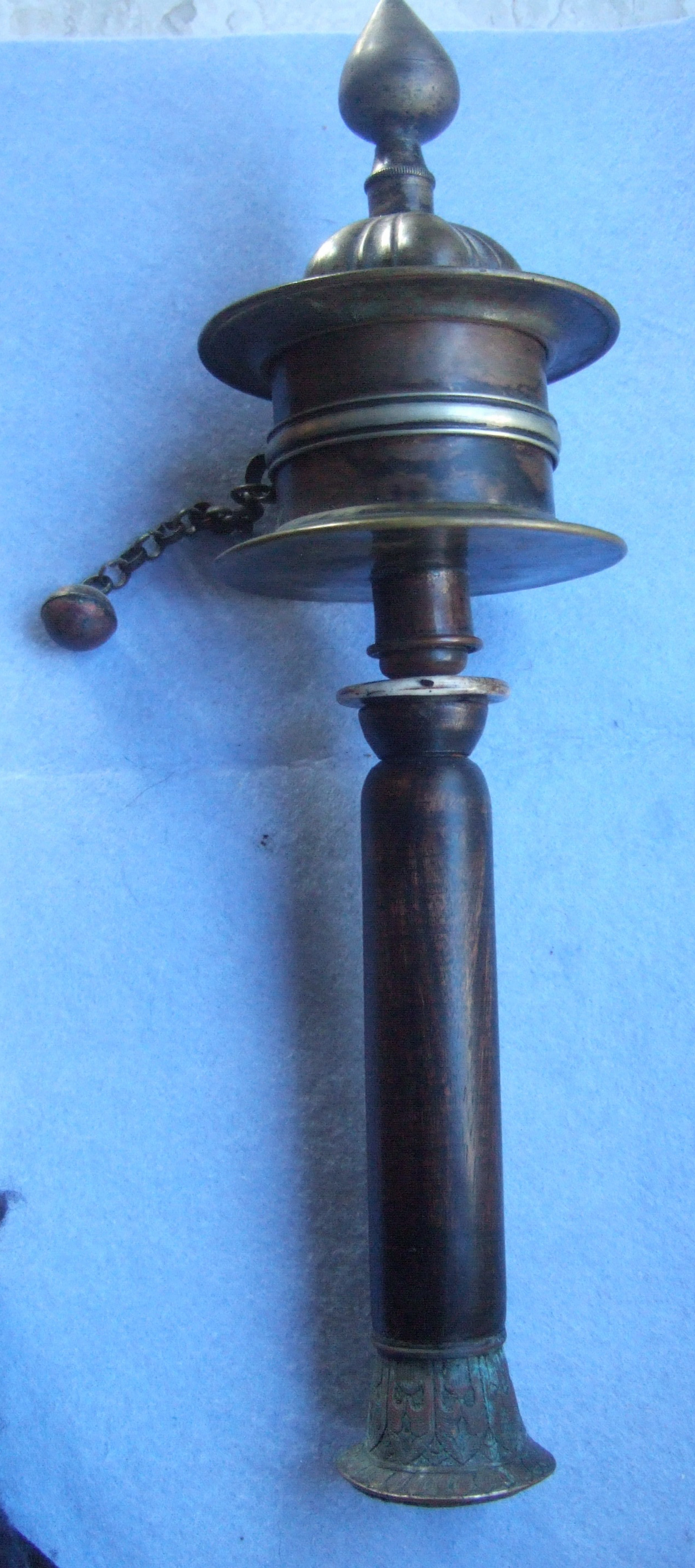
Tibetan hand prayer wheel

Three prayer wheels in the coat of arms of Sir Edmund Hillary

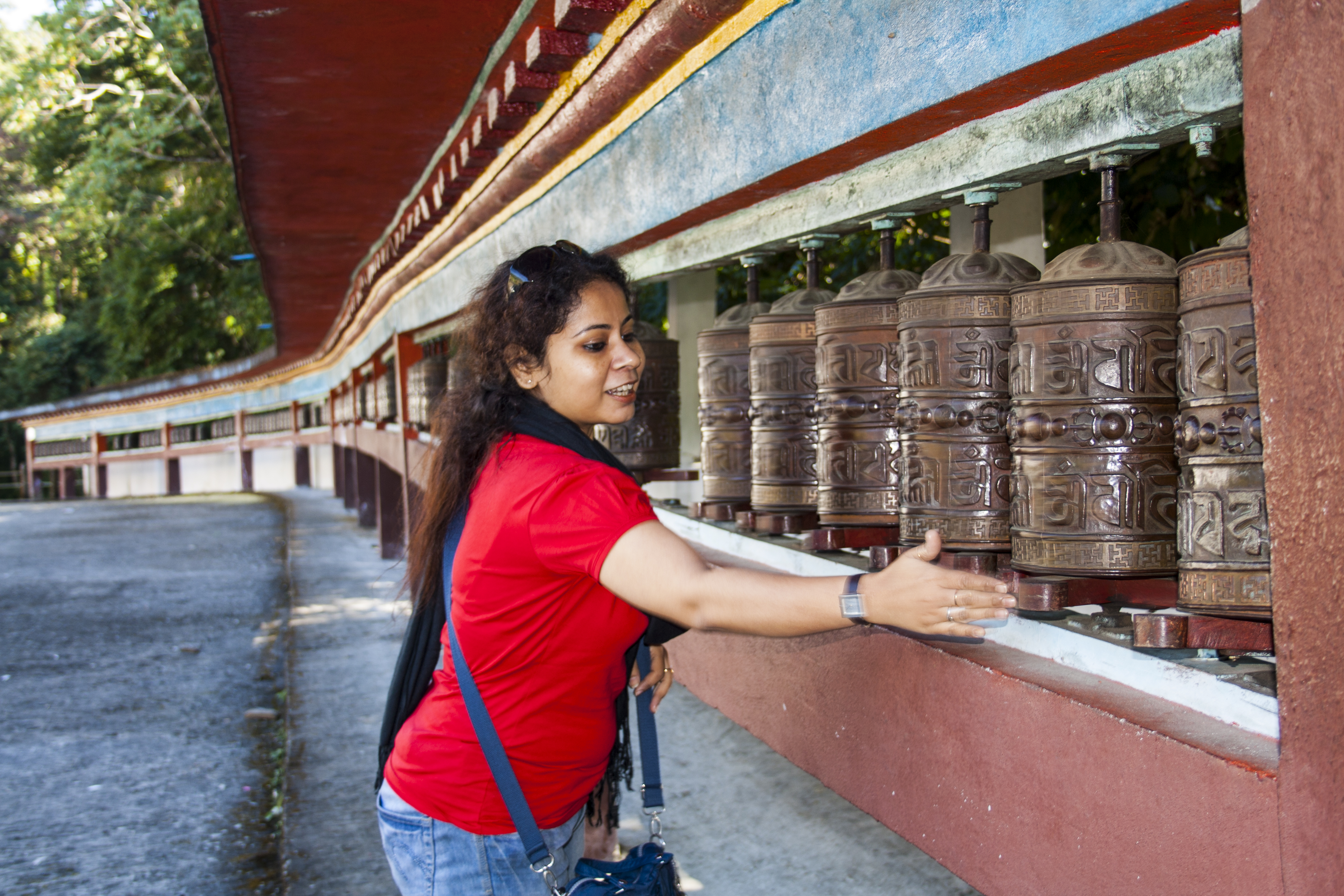
Rumtek Monastery - Prayer Wheel

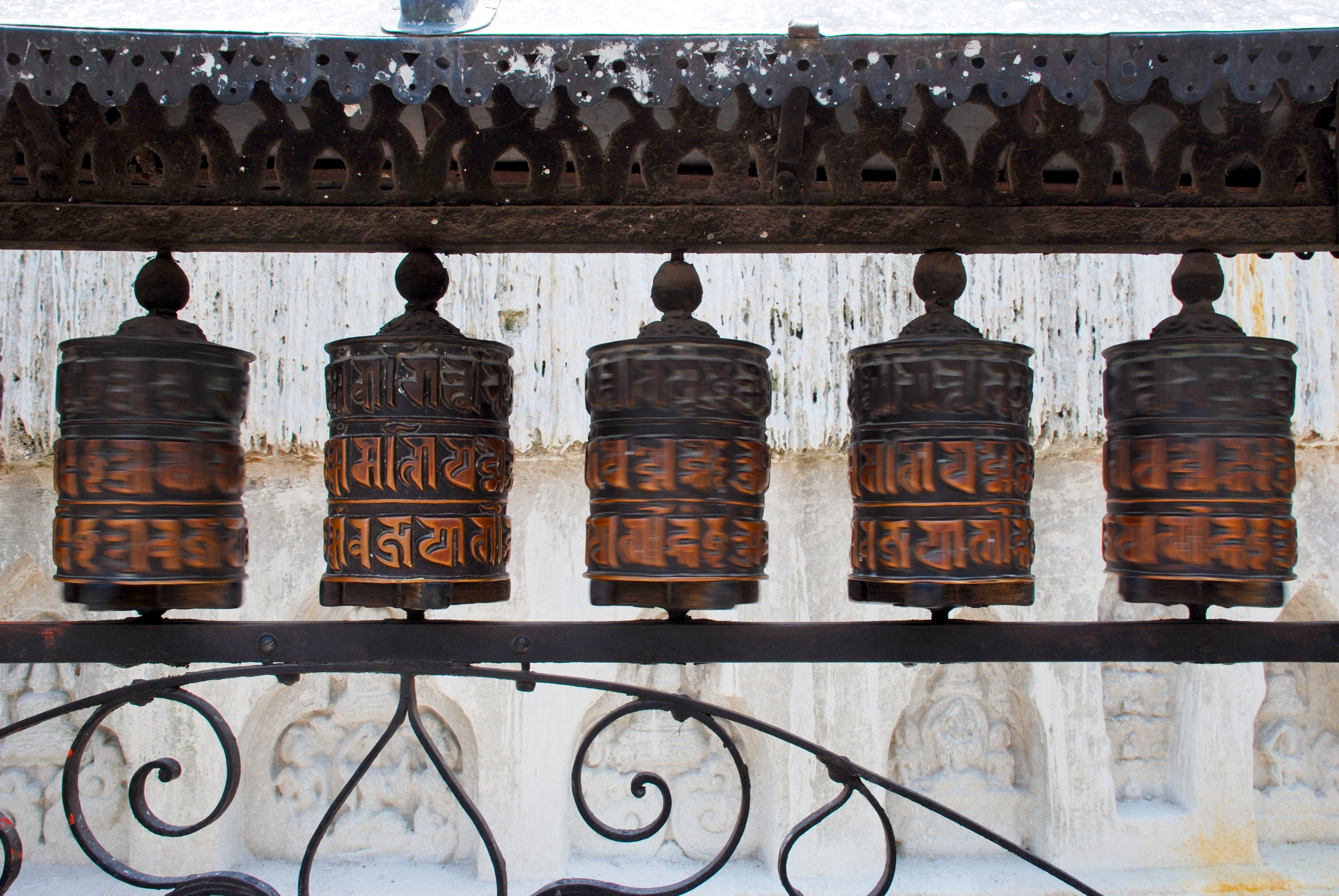
Rolling metal prayer wheels circling the Swayambhunath stupa, Kathmandu

== See also ==
- Maṇḍala
- Pradakshina
- Buddhist prayer beads
- Stupa
- Tibetan prayer flag
- Wheel of Dharma

== Bibliography ==
- Goodrich, L. Carrington (1942). "The Revolving Book-Case in China". Harvard Journal of Asiatic Studies. 7 (2): 130–161. doi:10.2307/2717800. JSTOR 2717800.
- Hunter, Alwin (1985). "Tibetan Prayer Wheels". Arts of Asia. 15 (1): 74–81.
- Ladner, Lorne (2000). Wheel of Great Compassion. Wisdom Publications.
- Lucas, Adam (2006). Wind, Water, Work: Ancient and Medieval Milling Technology. Brill Publishers. p. 105. ISBN 90-04-14649-0.
- Martin, Dan (1987). "On the Origin and Significance of the Prayer Wheel According to two Nineteenth-Century Tibetan Literary Sources" (PDF). Journal of the Tibet Society. 7.
- Schlagintweit, Emil (1863). Buddhism in Tibet. Augustus M. Kelley.
- Simpson, William (1896). The Buddhist Praying Wheel. London: Macmillan.
- Wright, A.R. (1904). Tibetan Prayer wheels. Folklore Enterprises.
- "All about the ... Prayer Wheel". khandro.net.
- "The Prayer Wheel". dharma-haven.org.
- "prayer wheels and how they work". Nyingma Centers.
