= Bodies of Evidence =

Bodies of Evidence may refer to:

- "Bodies of Evidence" (The Outer Limits), an episode of The Outer Limits
- Bodies of Evidence (TV series), an American television police drama series

== See also ==
- Body of Evidence (disambiguation)
