= Budda =

Budda may refer to:

- The Buddha, also known as Siddhartha Gautama or Shakyamuni, the founder of Buddhism
- Budda Baker (born 1996), athlete in the American National Football League
- Budda Aruna Reddy (born 1995), Indian artistic gymnast
- Budda Vengal Reddy (1822–1900), Indian philanthropist
- Bud'da, American hip hop producer, songwriter, and composer
- Parish of Budda, a region in New South Wales, Australia
- Eremophila duttonii, also known as budda, a flowering plant endemic to Australia
- Budda Amplification, American company that designs and manufactures electric guitar amplifiers and effects pedals

== See also ==
- Buddha (disambiguation)
