= Body =

Body may refer to:

== In science ==
- Physical body, an object in physics that represents a large amount, has mass or takes up space
- Body plan, the physical features shared by a group of animals
- Body (biology), the physical material of an organism
  - Human body, the entire structure of a human organism
    - Dead body, cadaver, or corpse, a dead human body
- (living) matter, see: Mind–body problem, the relationship between mind and matter in philosophy
- Aggregates within living matter, such as inclusion bodies

== In arts and entertainment ==
=== In film and television ===
- Jism (2003 film) or Body, a 2003 Indian film
- Body (2015 Polish film), a 2015 Polish film
- Body (2015 American film), a 2015 American film
- "Body" (Wonder Showzen episode), a 2006 episode of American sketch comedy television series Wonder Showzen
- "Body", an episode of the Adult Swim television series, Off the Air

=== In literature and publishing ===
- body text, the text forming the main content of any printed matter
- body (typography), the size of a piece of metal type
- B.O.D.Y. (manga), by Ao Mimori
- B O D Y, an international online literary magazine

=== In music ===
- Electronic body music, a genre

==== Albums ====
- Body (Aaamyyy album), 2019
- Body (The Necks album), 2018
- B.O.D.Y. (album) (Band Of D Year), 2006 album by Machel Montano
- Best Night of My Life, a 2010 Jamie Foxx album originally named Body

==== Songs ====
- "Body" (A Boogie wit da Hoodie song), 2024
- "Body" (Don Toliver song), 2026
- "Body" (Dreezy song), 2016
- "Body" (Ja Rule song), 2007
- "Body" (The Jacksons song), 1984
- "Body" (Loud Luxury song), 2017
- "Body" (Marques Houston song), 2009
- "Body" (Megan Thee Stallion song), 2020
- "Body" (Russ Millions and Tion Wayne song), 2021
- "Body" (Sean Paul song), 2017
- "Body", a song by Ella Henderson from Everything I Didn't Say, 2022
- "Body", a song by Funky Green Dogs from Star, 1999
- "Body", a song by Haley Blais from Wisecrack
- "Body", a song by Julia Michaels from Inner Monologue Part 2, 2019
- "Body", a song by Men Without Hats from No Hats Beyond This Point, 2003
- "Body", a song by Mother Mother from O My Heart, 2008
- "Body", a song by Teairra Marí, 2010
- "Body", a song by Topic, Fireboy DML and Nico Santos. 2025

== Other uses ==
- Jesse Ventura (born 1951), nicknamed "The Body", American media personality, actor, author, former politician and retired professional wrestler
- Body (surname)
- Body (transistor), a terminal of a field-effect transistor
- Body (wine), a wine tasting descriptor of sense of alcohol and feeling in the mouth
- Automobile body, the outer body of a motor vehicle which is built around a chassis
- Body corporate, a corporation capable of having legal rights and duties within a certain legal system
- Body politic, metaphor in which a nation is considered to be a corporate entity, being likened to a human body
- An HTML element that contains the displayable content of a page

== See also ==
- Bodi (disambiguation)
- Bodie (disambiguation)
- Bodies (disambiguation)
- Body of Evidence (disambiguation)
- Body part (disambiguation)
- Corporeal (disambiguation)
- Remains (disambiguation)
- The Body (disambiguation)
