= Bodies =

Bodies may refer to:

== Literature ==
- Bodies (short story), a 1970 short story by Joyce Carol Oates
- Bodies, a 1977 play by James Saunders
- Bodies (novel), a 2002 novel by Jed Mercurio
- Bodies, a 2009 book by Susie Orbach
- Bodies (comics), a 2014–2015 Vertigo Comics detective fiction series

== Music ==
=== Albums ===
- Bodies (AFI album), 2021
- Bodies (Thornhill album), 2025
- Bodies (EP), by Celia Pavey, or the title song, 2014

=== Songs ===
- "Bodies" (Drowning Pool song), 2001
- "Bodies" (Little Birdy song), 2007
- "Bodies" (Offset and JID song), 2025
- "Bodies" (Robbie Williams song), 2009
- "Bodies" (Sex Pistols song), 1977
- "Bodies", by CeeLo Green from The Lady Killer, 2010
- "Bodies", by Danzig from Danzig III: How the Gods Kill, 1992
- "Bodies", by Dominic Fike from Sunburn, 2023
- "Bodies" (unreleased), by Kendrick Lamar from GNX trailer
- "Bodies", by Megadeth from Endgame, 2009
- "Bodies", by the Smashing Pumpkins from Mellon Collie and the Infinite Sadness, 1995

== Television ==
- Bodies (2004 TV series), a British medical drama
- Bodies (2023 TV series), a British crime thriller limited series
- "Bodies" (Brand New Cherry Flavor), a 2021 episode
- "Bodies" (Law & Order), a 2003 episode

== Other uses ==
- Bodies (podcast), a 2018 podcast by KCRW
- Bodies: The Exhibition, an exhibit displaying dissected and preserved human bodies

== See also ==
- Body (disambiguation)
