= The Body =

The Body may refer to:

== Literature ==
- The Body (short story), a short story by Camillo Boito
- The Body (King novella), a novel written by Stephen King
- The Body (Sapir novel), a novel by Richard Sapir
- The Body (Kureishi novel), a novel by Hanif Kureishi
- The Body: An Essay, a 2002 book by Jenny Boully

== Film and TV ==
- The Body (1970 film), a documentary about the human anatomy
- The Body (1974 film), a film starring Zeudi Araya and Carroll Baker
- The Body (2001 film), a film starring Antonio Banderas based on the book by Richard Sapir
- The Body (2012 film), a Spanish film
- The Body (2018 film), a Korean film
- The Body (2019 film), a Hindi film
- The Body (2023 film), a Czech drama film
- "The Body" (Buffy the Vampire Slayer), the sixteenth episode of the fifth season of Buffy the Vampire Slayer
- "Chapter Four: The Body", the fourth episode of the first season of Stranger Things
- "The Body" (Into the Dark), an episode of the first season of Into the Dark
- "The Body" (American Horror Story), an episode of the eleventh season of American Horror Story
- The Body (TV series), a 2026 series created by Quinn Shephard

== Music ==
- The Body (band), an American experimental metal band
- "The Body" (song), by Wale
- "The Body", a song by Public Image Ltd from the album Happy?

== People ==
- Joe Kopicki, an American NBA basketball player nicknamed "The Body"
- Ben Wallace (basketball), an American NBA basketball player nicknamed "The Body"
- Marie McDonald, an American actress nicknamed "The Body"
- Elle Macpherson, an Australian supermodel nicknamed "The Body"
- Jesse Ventura, an American professional wrestler, actor, and politician nicknamed "The Body"
- Robert Lewandowski, a Polish footballer nicknamed "The Body"

== See also ==
- Body (disambiguation)
