= Body part =

A body part is a part of an animal body.

Body part, Body Parts, or Bodyparts may also refer to:

== Art, entertainment, and media ==
- Body Parts (film), a 1991 film starring Jeff Fahey and Kim Delaney
- "Body Parts" (Star Trek: Deep Space Nine), a 1996 episode of Star Trek: Deep Space Nine
- Bodyparts (1998), a novel by Theresa Breslin
- Bodyparts (album), a 2012 album by Dragonette
- Body Parts (Cypress Hill album), 2000
- Body Parts (Prophet Posse album), 1998
- "Body Parts", a song by Three 6 Mafia from their album Chapter 1: The End
  - "Body Parts 2", from their album Chapter 2: World Domination
  - "Body Parts 3", from their album Most Known Unknown
- "Body Parts", a song from Albion (Ginger Wildheart album)
- "Body Parts", a 2010 song by Plain White T's from Wonders of the Younger

== Other uses ==
- Organ trade, trade in body parts
- Vehicle body part, manufactured components of automobiles

== See also ==
- Body (disambiguation)
- Body plan, morphological features shared by a group of related species
- Part (disambiguation)
- Category:Body parts of individual people
- Category:Egyptian hieroglyphs: parts of the human body
- Category:Metaphors referring to body parts
