= David Bodey =

British judge

Sir David Roderick Lessiter Bodey (born 14 October 1947) is a British judge who was a Justice of the High Court of England and Wales.

== Legal career ==
Bodey was called to the bar at Middle Temple, where he was a Harmsworth scholar, in 1970. He became legal assessor to the UK Central Council for Nursing, Midwifery and Health Visiting (now the Nursing and Midwifery Council in 1983. He was appointed an Assistant Recorder in 1989, and became a Queen's Counsel in 1991. He became a Recorder in 1993, and was appointed as a Deputy High Court judge from 1995.

That same year (1995), he became a fellow of the International Academy of Matrimonial Lawyers, a member of the Family Committee of Justice (serving until 1998), was appointed to the Supreme Court (now Senior Courts) Procedure Committee (serving until 1997), and became secretary of the Family Law Bar Association. He was the Association's president in 1997. Bodey was appointed Director of Family Training for the Judicial Studies Board, and continues in that role for the Board's successor, the Judicial College.

On 12 January 1999, Bodey was appointed to the High Court, receiving the customary knighthood, and assigned to the Family Division. He served as Family Liaison Judge for London from 1999 to 2001, then for the North Eastern Circuit until 2007. He retired from the bench on 15 October 2017.
