= Böde =

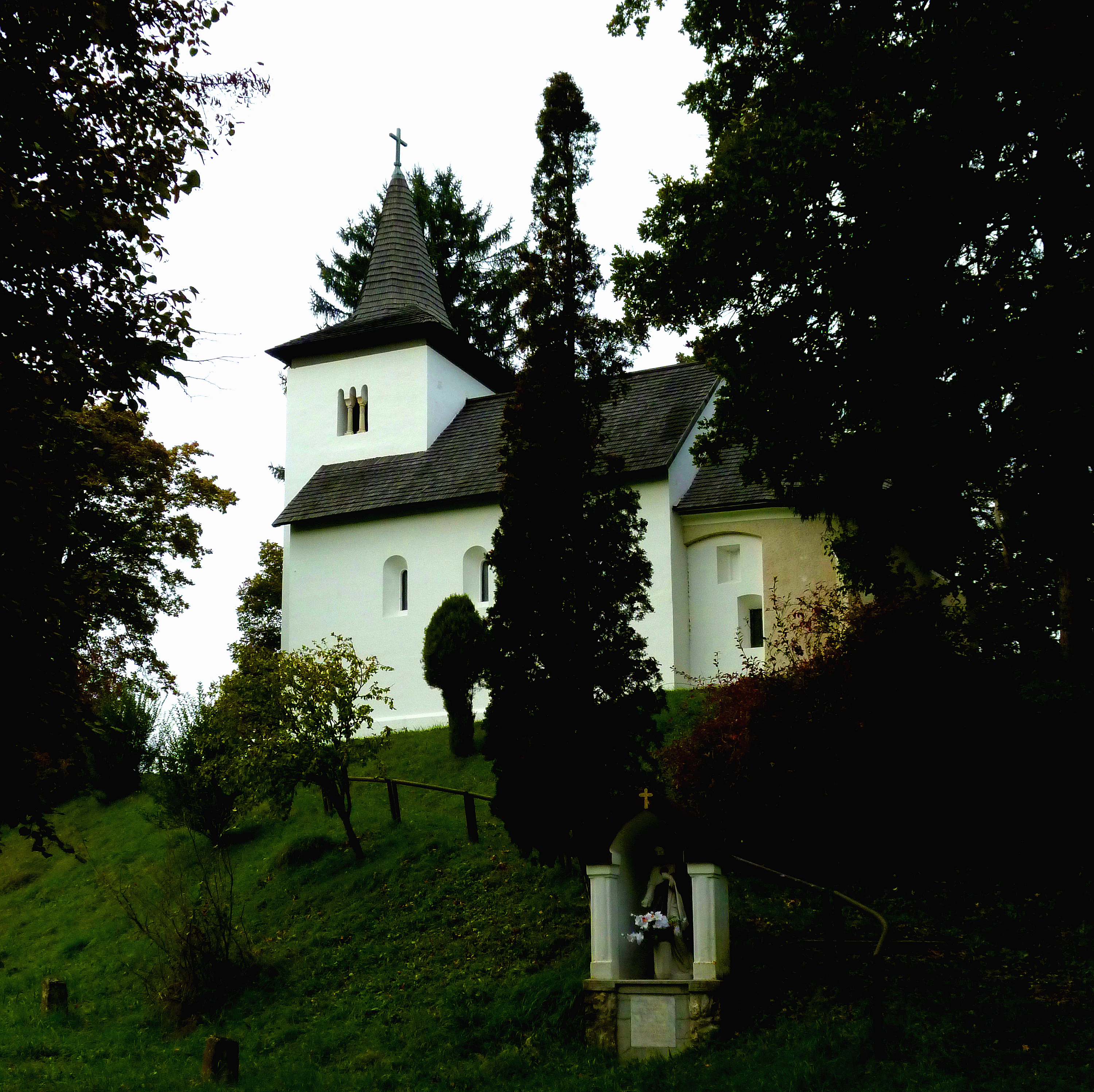

- Location of Böde in Hungary
- Coordinates: 46.83873°N 16.72065°E
- Country: Hungary
- Region: Western Transdanubia
- County: Zala
- Subregion: Zalaegerszegi
- Rank: Village

Area
  - Total: 9.17 km^{2} (3.54 sq mi)

Population (1 January 2008)
  - Total: 307
  - Density: 33.5/km^{2} (86.7/sq mi)
- Time zone: UTC+1 (CET)
  - Summer (DST): UTC+2 (CEST)
- Postal code: 8991
- Area code: +36 92
- KSH code: 22877
- Website: http://böde.hu/polgarmesteri-hivatal/

Böde is a village in Zala County, in Hungary. In its vicinity can be found the church of Böde-Zalaszentmihályfa from the Árpád dynasty age.

The village is south of Zalaegerszeg, the center of Zala County.

== Gallery ==
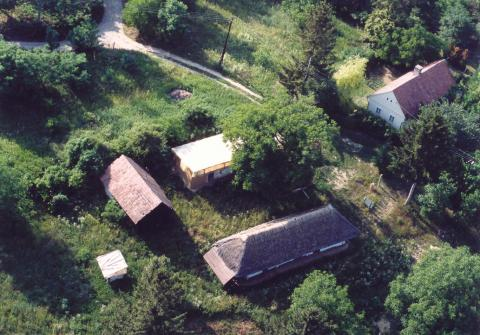

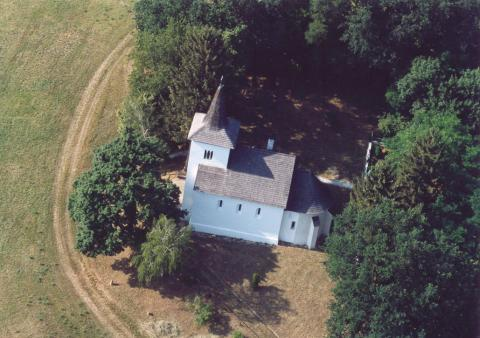
