= Veronika Bode =

German politician (born 1972)

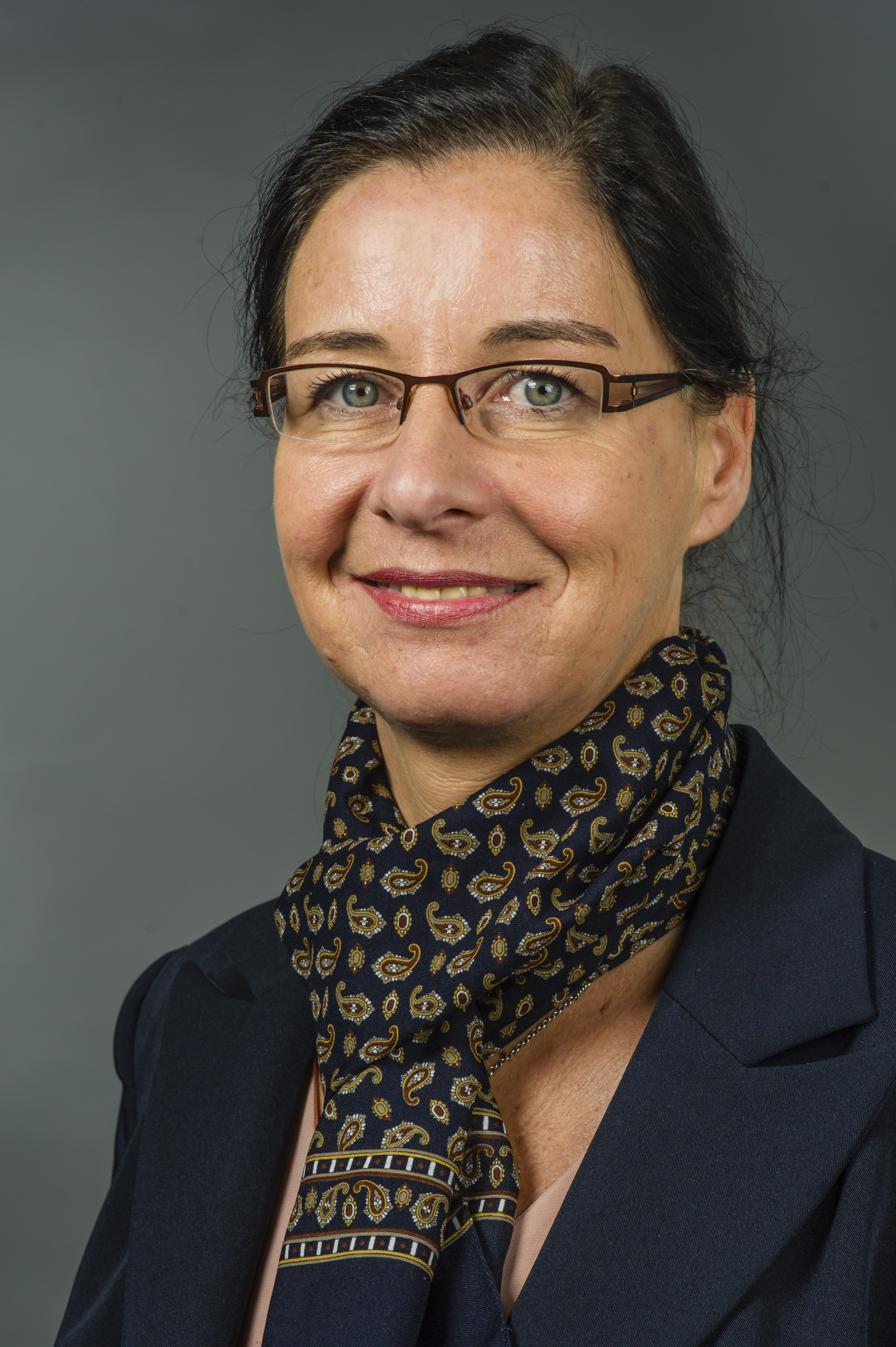
- Bode in 2018

Member of the Landtag of Lower Saxony
- Incumbent
- Assumed office 14 November 2017

Personal details
- Born: 8 October 1972 (age 53) Helmstedt
- Party: Christian Democratic Union

Veronika Bode (née Nitschke; formerly Koch; born 8 October 1972 in Helmstedt) is a German politician serving as a member of the Landtag of Lower Saxony since 2017. She has served as chairwoman of the Christian Democratic Union in Helmstedt since 2022.
