= Wolfram Bode =

German biochemist (1942–2025)

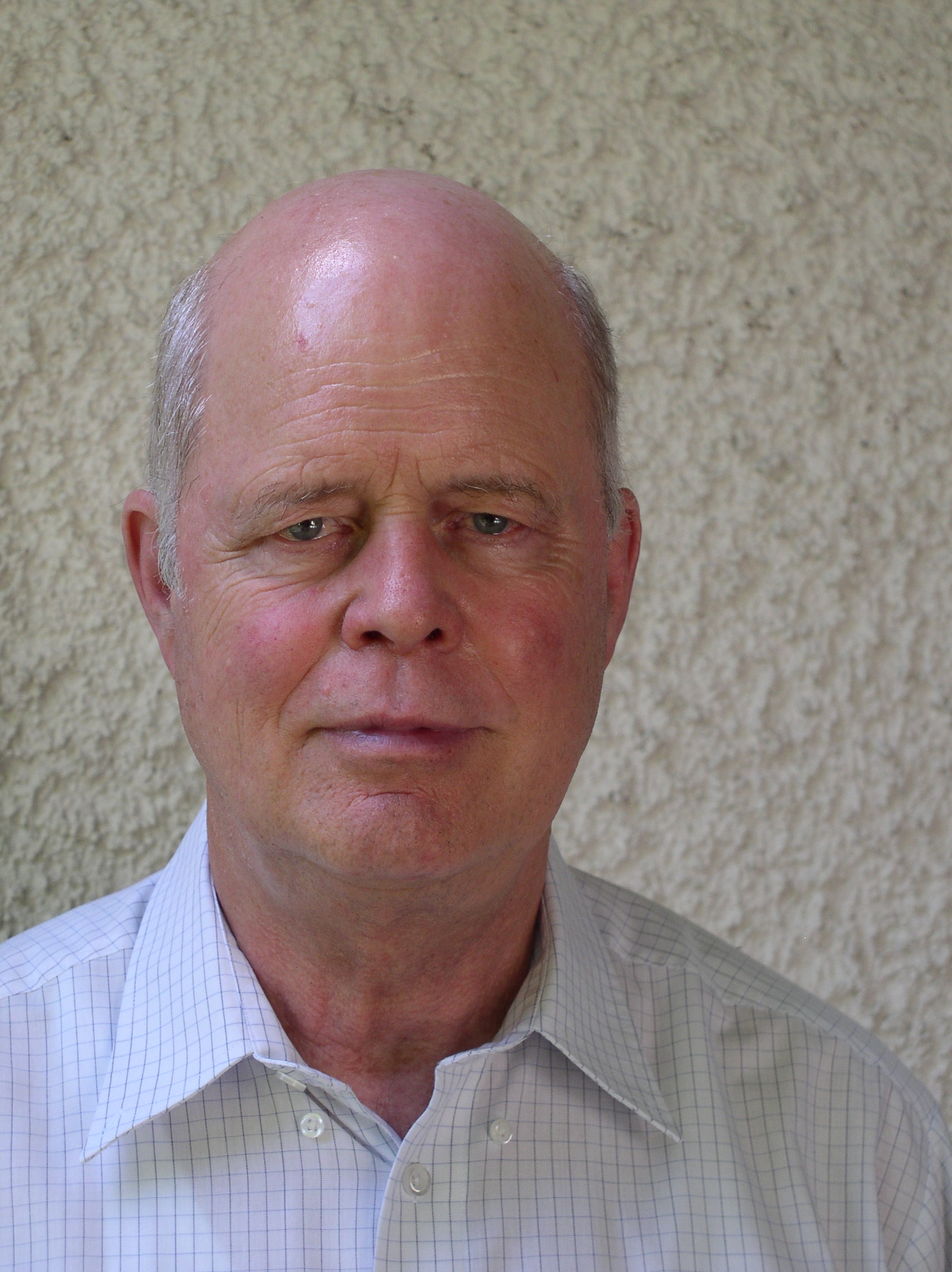
- Born: 8 March 1942; Berlin, Germany
- Died: 25 January 2025 (aged 82)
- Known for: Crystallography, Proteases
- Scientific career
- Fields: Biochemist
- Workplaces: Max Planck Institute of Biochemistry

Wolfram Bode (8 March 1942 – 25 January 2025) was a German biochemist.

== Background ==
Born in Berlin, Bode was educated in chemistry and biochemistry at the University of Göttingen, the University of Tübingen and LMU Munich as a fellow of the Studienstiftung des deutschen Volkes. He obtained his Ph.D. in 1971 at LMU Munich for studies of the bacterial flagellum. From 1972, he worked at the Max Planck Institute of Biochemistry in Martinsried. Bode was associate professor at LMU Munich. He died on 25 January 2025 at the age of 82.

== Career ==
During his graduate studies Bode was using x-ray scattering. After his Ph.D. he then joined the lab of Robert Huber to work with x-ray crystallography. In 1975 Bode published the structure of trypsin, which was among the first protease structures that could be solved. His following work on the structure and function of proteins has contributed significantly to the understanding of several important biological processes, especially coagulation, fibrinolysis and photosynthesis.
