= Bodies (podcast) =

Podcast by KCRW

Bodies is a podcast hosted by Allison Behringer and produced by KCRW. The first season debuted in 2018 and was a total of four episodes long. The show has since released four seasons. In the show, Behringer discusses the necessity of passing knowledge from one generation to the next and the responsibility of a parent to provide proper sex education to their children.

The show won an Online Journalism Award in 2019 for the episode entitled "Sex Hurts". In the episode, Behringer recounts how a doctor dismissed her concerns when she expressed that she had been experiencing pain whenever she had sex, which turned out to be due to the contraceptive that she was taking at the time. The show won a Third Coast Festival Award in 2020 for the episode entitled "Not This Again", featuring former VICE editor Angelina Fanous and produced by journalist Hannah Harris Green. Behringer was granted a 2019 fellowship by the USC Annenberg School for Communication and Journalism. Thrillest included the show on their list of the best podcasts of 2018.
