= Bruce Bode =

American medical researcher

Bruce Bode, MD, FACE
- Education: Emory University School of Medicine; College of Wooster
- Website: Atlanta Diabetes Associates

Bruce Bode, MD, FACE is a diabetes specialist with the Atlanta Diabetes Associates in Atlanta, GA and is a clinical associate professor at Emory University in the Department of Medicine. He has served on the board of directors of the Atlanta chapters of the Juvenile Diabetes Research Foundation (JDRF), the American Diabetes Association (ADA), and various Georgia-based diabetes camps. Bode is a member of the board of directors of Glytec and an active member of the JDRF research team validating the efficacy and safety of real-time continuous glucose monitoring (CGMS), and is a former president of the ADA Georgia Affiliate and editor of the ADA's 2004 edition of Medical Management of Type 1 Diabetes.

== Education ==
Bode received his medical degree from Emory University School of Medicine in Atlanta, GA and completed a fellowship in diabetes with Paul C. Davidson, MD, and an internship and residency at Emory University Affiliated Hospitals.

== Inpatient glycemic management ==
Bode has co-authored many publications on the subject of inpatient glucose control and was a co-developer of the Glucommander software, a computer-directed intravenous insulin system manufactured by Glytec, LLC.

The Glucommander is intended to evaluate the current as well as cumulative patient blood glucose values, and, based on the aggregate of those measurements, whether one or many, regulate the infusion of I.V. fluids, through an I.V. infusion pump, and drive the blood glucose level towards a predetermined target range. Once that target blood glucose range has been reached, the system's function is to recommend a titration of insulin, glucose, and saline for the purpose of maintaining the patient's blood glucose level in that target range. The system is programmed to provide intravenous dosing of glucose, saline, and insulin, as well as subcutaneous dosing of glucose and insulin.
