= Thilo Bode =

Founder of Foodwatch

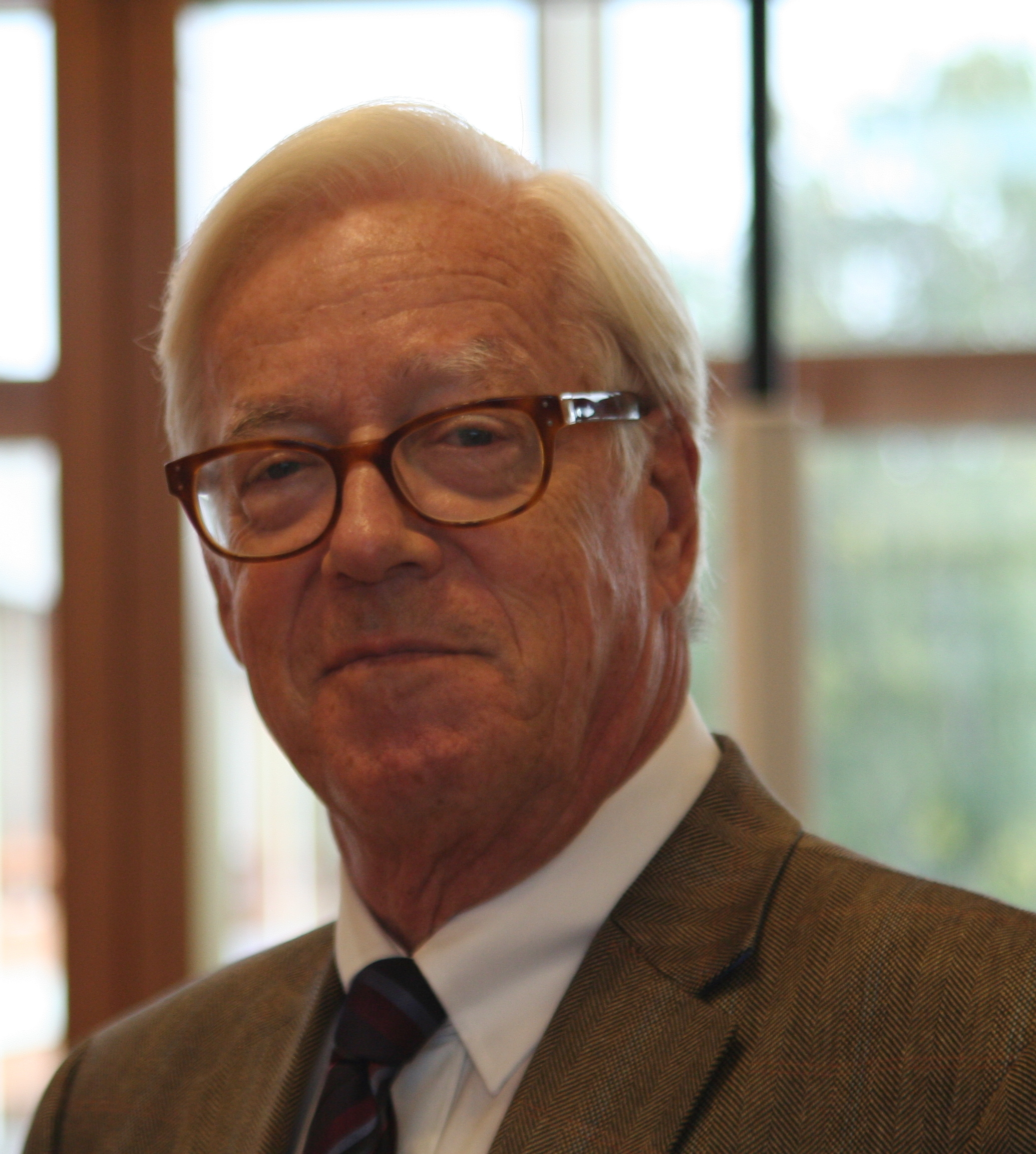
Thilo Bode, 2016

Thilo Bode (Note: Not to be confused with the like-named commanding officer of German submarine U-858 during World War II.) (born 14 January 1947) is the founder and International Director of the consumer rights advocacy group Foodwatch, and was previously the CEO of Greenpeace.

== Career ==
Born in Eching am Ammersee, Germany, Bode is the son of journalist Thilo Bode and a bookseller. After graduating from the Karlsgymnasium München-Pasing high school in 1966, he founded the Working Group of Young Socialists in the SPD (Jusos) union for the municipality of Herrsching am Ammersee and served as Jusos chairman for the district of Starnberg. He began studying sociology at the universities of Munich and Regensburg, before changing course to economics. After graduating with a degree in economics in 1972, Bode received a doctoral scholarship and, in 1975, Bode became a doctor of political sciences. His dissertation was on direct investments. Bode later worked for engineering company Lahmeyer International, for the development bank Kreditanstalt für Wiederaufbau (KfW) and as an executive assistant to a medium-sized Düsseldorf company in the metal industry.

From 1989 to 1995, he served as managing director of the German arm of the environmental organization Greenpeace and from 1995 to 2001, he served in the same position at Greenpeace International. In 2002, Bode founded the consumer protection organization Foodwatch, and led the organization as managing director. In April 2017, he relinquished the management of Foodwatch Germany to Martin Rücker and has since served as director for Foodwatch International. He also regularly publishes political science papers, for example in the Blättern für deutsche und internationale Politik.

== Anti-TTIP Actions ==
Bode is a prominent critic and activist against the proposed Transatlantic Trade and Investment Partnership (TTIP). In 2015, he helped organise an anti-TTIP rally in Berlin which drew more than 150,000 demonstrators. Friedrich Merz, a former MEP and former member of the Bundestag, criticized Bode's actions by stating “the fact that he’s speaking of hypothetical scenarios ... demonstrates that he can’t find anything in the texts to prove his point.” As a result of anti-TTIP actions, including Bode's, support for the partnership dropped from 55% to 17% in Germany and major trade unions, who once supported the agreement, began to oppose it.

== Awards ==
2009: Social Entrepreneur of the Year - Germany, awarded by the Schwab Foundation

== Controversy ==
In 2010, Federal Minister of Food and Agriculture Minister Ilse Aigner (CSU), who has been frequently criticized by Foodwatch for her consumer policies, accused Thilo Bode and Foodwatch's campaigns for using "scandal" as a business model, focussing on "campaigns which stir up a climate of uncertainty".

== Works ==
- Die Demokratie verrät ihre Kinder: Ex-Greenpeace-Chef fordert die Mächtigen heraus (in German), Stuttgart/München: DVA, 2003, ISBN 3-421-05679-X
- Abgespeist: Wie wir beim Essen betrogen werden und was wir dagegen tun können (in German), Frankfurt am Main: S. Fischer, 2007, ISBN 978-3-10-004307-8
- Die Essensfälscher: Was uns die Lebensmittelkonzerne auf die Teller lügen (in German), Frankfurt am Main: S. Fischer, 2010, ISBN 978-3-10-004308-5
- Die Freihandelslüge (The Free Trade Lie): Warum TTIP nur den Konzernen nützt – und uns allen schadet (in German), Stuttgart: DVA, 2015, ISBN 978-3-421-04679-6
- Die Diktatur der Konzerne: Wie globale Unternehmen uns schaden und die Demokratie zerstören (in German), Frankfurt am Main: S. Fischer, 2018, ISBN 978-3-10-397362-4
