= Human remains =

Human remains may refer to:

== A corpse or skeleton ==
- A deceased human body or the parts thereof
  - A cadaver
  - A skeleton

== Music ==
- Human Remains (band), an American grindcore band
- Human Remains (Hell album), 2011
- Human Remains (Terry Allen album), 1996

== Film and television ==
- Human Remains (film), a 1998 documentary film by Jay Rosenblatt
- Human Remains (TV series), a 2000 comedy series on the BBC

== See also ==
- Conservation and restoration of human remains
