= Buddha (disambiguation) =

Buddha is a title in the Buddhist religion for those that achieve Buddhahood. It is often associated with Siddhartha Gautama, or the Buddha, founder of Buddhism and first person to achieve this title.

Other uses include:

== Arts and entertainment ==
- Buddha (album), by Blink-182, 1994
- Buddha (manga), by Osamu Tezuka, 1972–1983
- A Buddha, a 2005 Argentine film
- Buddha (2007 film) or Gautama Buddha, an Indian film
- The Buddha (2010 film), an American television documentary film
- Buddha (TV series), a 2013 Indian historical drama series
- Tathagatha Buddha (film), a 2008 Indian feature film

== Other uses ==
- Buddha Air, a Nepalese airline
- Buddha, Indiana, an unincorporated community in the United States

== See also ==
- Bodhi (disambiguation)
- Bodh (disambiguation)
- Budda (disambiguation)
- Buda (disambiguation), other uses of the term Buda
  - Buda, western part of the Hungarian capital Budapest
- Buddha Temple, a summit in the Grand Canyon
- Buddah Records, an American record label
- Budha, a Sanskrit word that connotes the planet Mercury, or deity in Hinduism and Hindu astrology
- Budai, a Chinese monk venerated as Maitreya Buddha and often confused with Siddhartha Gautama
