= Bod Mellor =

British painter, born 1970

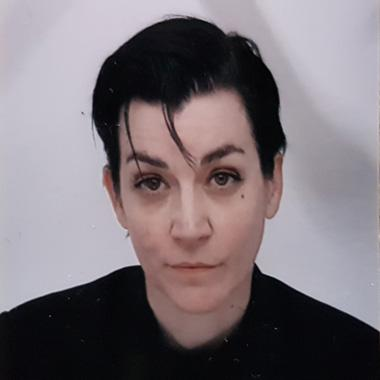
Mellor in 2016

Bod Mellor (born 1970; previously named Dawn Mellor) is a British painter, noted for unconventional, stylised portraits of well-known figures.

== Early life and education ==
Mellor was born in Manchester, England. They attended Central St. Martin's for their undergraduate studies, and received their Masters from the Royal College of Art in London.

As a teenager, Mellor was fascinated with Michael Jackson, and drew numerous portraits of the singer. A book of these drawings, entitled Michael Jackson and Other Men, was published by Studio Voltaire in 2012.

== Career and work ==
Mellor is known for making "obstreperously satiric portraits of celebrities". Their paintings, which tend to reference iconic images of their famous subjects, often feature graphic violence, verbal profanity and explicit sexuality.

In a profile of Mellor in The Guardian, writer Jessica Lack draws a contrast between the artist and her contemporary, Elizabeth Peyton, who is also known for portraying the famous: "[Mellor's] paintings do not speak of the mysticism and romance of stardom. Her celebrities are not quixotic figures, but the personification of our basest emotions. They are grotesque parodies: sallow, deformed and cruel. Over the years, she has painted Britney Spears as a bald-headed, Charles Manson-ish psycho, Judy Garland as a pill-vomiting virgin, and Julianne Moore as a bloodshot zombie with teeth to rival Shane MacGowan's."

A subject of particular interest to Mellor is Dorothy, the protagonist of The Wizard of Oz, portrayed by Judy Garland, whom they have painted repeatedly in their 2008 exhibition at Team Gallery, A Curse on your Walls. Other regular subjects include Winona Ryder, Angelina Jolie, Madonna, Queen Elizabeth The Queen Mother, Mother Teresa, Condoleezza Rice, Shimon Peres, and Margaret Thatcher.

Mellor has held numerous dedicated exhibitions since their debut solo at Victoria Miro Gallery in London in 1999. In 2008, they held a solo exhibition at the Migros Museum für Gegenwartskunst in Zürich.

In 2019 they published a book, Sirens, described as a novel and also containing the artist's set of "Sirens" paintings which portrayed British actresses playing police officers in film or television, previously exhibited at the Team Gallery in New York.

In 2020 Mellor was commissioned to produce an outdoor mural of George Michael by the Studio Voltaire, which was completed in September 2020 as part of Brent Biennial. The same year, in a Guardian article they discuss this project, their non-binary identity, and addressed the 2019 allegations from Twitter users, tabloid media and Art Review that they were masquerading as trans and non-binary.

== Personal life ==
Mellor is non-binary and uses they and them pronouns. They changed their name by deed poll to Bod Mellor in June 2021. Tate now lists Mellor's works under "Bod Mellor".

== Selected publications ==
- Sirens (2019, Montez Press: ISBN 978-1-9160634-4-0)
