= Body of Evidence =

Body of Evidence may refer to:

- Body of Evidence (1988 film), a 1988 TV film starring Barry Bostwick and Margot Kidder
- Body of Evidence (novel), a 1991 novel by Patricia Cornwell
- Body of Evidence (1993 film), a 1993 erotic drama starring Madonna and Willem Dafoe
- Body of Evidence, a 1999 mystery novel series by Christopher Golden
- Body of Evidence: From the Case Files of Dayle Hinman, a 2001 television series showcasing the case files of Dayle Hinman on truTV
- "Body of Evidence" (New Tricks), a 2012 television episode

== See also ==
- Bodies of Evidence (disambiguation)
- Body of Proof, a 2011 TV series
