= Bodsworth =

Bodsworth may refer to:

- Fred Bodsworth (1918–2012), Canadian writer, journalist, and naturalist
- Vic Bodsworth (1931–1967), Australian rules footballer
