= Bodhi (disambiguation) =

Bodhi is a Buddhist term associated with enlightenment.

Bodhi may also refer to:

== People ==
- Bodhi Rae Breathnach (born 2011), Irish child actress
- Bodhi Elfman, American actor
- Bhikkhu Bodhi (born 1944), American Buddhist monk
- Sinn Bodhi (born 1973), Serbo-Canadian professional wrestler

== Fictional characters ==
- Bodhi Rook, in the Star Wars franchise
- Bodhi (character), in the 1991 film Point Break and its 2015 remake
- Bodhi, a vampire in the 2000 video game Baldur's Gate II: Shadows of Amn

== Other uses ==
- Bodhi Linux, a Linux distribution
- Bodhi Magazine, a Buddhist periodical
- Ficus religiosa, also known as the bodhi tree, a species of fig tree
  - Bodhi Tree, a sacred fig tree in Bodh Gaya, India under which Gautama Buddha attained enlightenment

== See also ==
- Bodi (disambiguation)
- Bodh (disambiguation)
- Buddha (disambiguation)
