= Georg Heinrich Bode =

German philologist and translator

Georg Heinrich Bode (1802—1846) was a German classical philologist and translator. From 1820, he studied philology at the University of Göttingen. He is known for his three-volume work on the history of Greek poetry.

== Works ==
- Orpheus poetarum Graecorum antiquissimus. Göttingen, 1824.
- Scriptores rerum mythicarum Latini tres Romae nuper reperti, 2 vols. Celle, 1834.
- Geschichte der hellenischen Dichtkunst [History of Greek Poetry]. K. F. Köhler. 1838–1840.
- Quaestiones de antiquissima carminum Orphicorum aetate patria atque indole. Göttingen, 1838.
