= Nigerian senators of the 5th National Assembly =

Senators of the 5th National Assembly of Nigeria

The table below lists Nigerian senators of the 5th National Assembly. The 5th National Assembly (2003 -2007) was inaugurated on 29 May 2003. The Senate includes three senators from each of the 36 states, plus one senator for the Federal Capital Territory, Abuja. Evan Enwerem, who was elected president of the Senate was succeeded by Chuba Okadigbo . Okadigbo was later replaced by Pius Anyim.

== See also ==
- Nigerian Senate
