= Nevada Belle =

Nevada Belle is a musical play written by George D. Morgan and Duane Ashby. Nevada Belle had its workshop premiere in 1998 at the Livery Theatre in Ventura, California. It then went through a long period of rewrites before having its official world premiere at the Petit Theatre in Oxnard, California in 2004.

== Background ==
In the mid-1990s, screenwriter and playwright George Morgan was working as an actor on a tourist train in Fillmore, California, playing the detective in a rolling murder mystery dinner theatre. One day the owners of the train asked Morgan if he might consider writing an original musical play to be incorporated into their evening shows. Collaborating with arranger/lyricist Duane Ashby, they created a story about six young women traveling from New York to Virginia City, Nevada in the late 19th century.

== Story ==
Nevada Belle tells the true story of six young women who lived in the 19th century, all of whom ended up working the saloons in Virginia City, Nevada. Though they arrived there at different times, the authors use some license and put all six characters on the same train at the same time. Except for a short opening sequence outside a theatre in New York (where Sarah Bernhardt is performing), the entire story takes place on a steam train as it travels across the United States. The six young women are recruited and watched over by famed Virginia City courtesan Cad Thompson.

The play's main character, Rosa May, worked several years for Cad Thompson in Virginia City before eventually settling in Bodie.

The show has fifteen Broadway-style tunes. Nevada Belle is distributed by Music Box International: www.musicboxint.com
