= Bodie, Washington =

- Ghost town
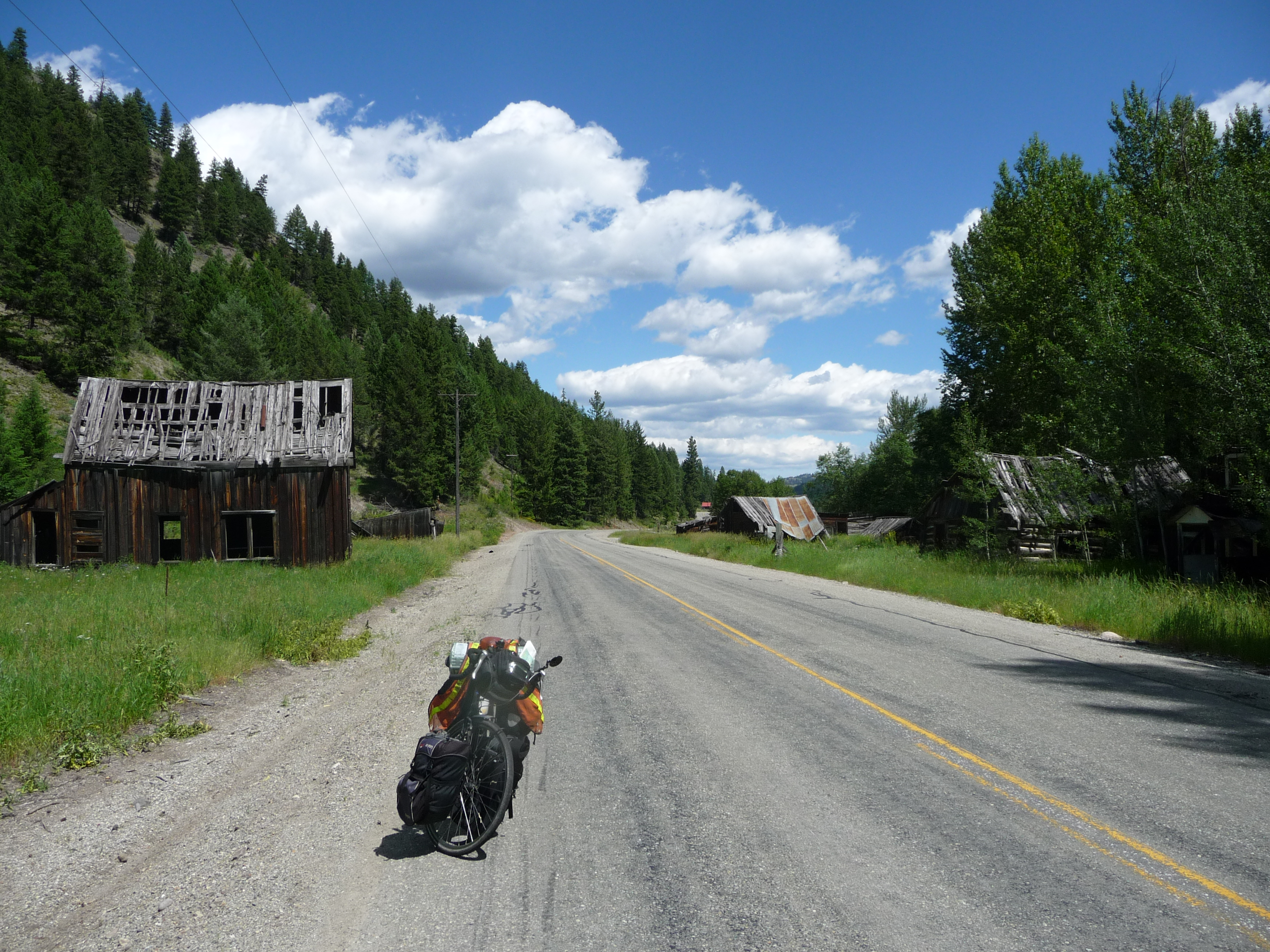

- Location of Bodie in Washington
- Coordinates: 48°49′58″N 118°53′48″W
- Country: United States
- State: Washington
- County: Okanogan
- Settled: 1888
- Elevation: 2,592 ft (790 m)

Population (2000)
  - Total: 0
- Time zone: UTC-8 (Pacific (PST))
  - Summer (DST): UTC-7 (PDT)
- Zip code: 98859
- Area code: 509
- GNIS feature ID: 1516745

Bodie is a ghost town in Okanogan County, Washington, United States.

== Geography ==
Bodie is about 15 miles (24 km) by stagecoach heading north of Wauconda along Toroda Creek (County Road 9495) off Washington State Route 20. Bodie lies 2592 feet (790 m) above sea level.

== History of the region ==
In 1886 prospectors Tommy Ryan and Phil Creasor discovered a continuous mineralized ledge in the North of Okanogan County, and claimed the area as Eureka Gulch, which soon after became known as Republic. Republic's rapid heyday boasted seven hotels, twenty saloons, nine general stores, and an undisclosed number of brothels. The quality of ore discovered spurred the existence of many nearby mines and townships, including the near neighbors of Wauconda, Washington, and Bodie.

=== Bodie, Washington ===
Occupied in early 1888, two years after Ryan and Creasor discovered the lucrative area which became Republic's Knob Hill Mine, high quality ore was extracted, milled and processed right in Bodie until the falling gold prices closed the township's mine and emptied its buildings in 1934, at which time the town had functionally relocated to the Bodie Mining Camp. An estimated US$1.2 million in gold was recovered, and it's said that Bodie Creek still runs color. This scenic area, and its related ghost towns, regularly attract historians, mining buffs, and photographers to the slanting buildings, rusty equipment and mysterious log cabins. There is only one intact structure remaining of the original "Old Bodie", a small two-story house converted to a storage building with the help of local resident Doug Prichard. The largest, most visible structure still vertical in what is now Bodie, is often cited as a schoolhouse which doubled as a saloon, but local legend disputes the matter. Old Bodie has also been confused with an assembly of cabins North of the Bodie Mining Camp, at the junction of Toroda Creek and the road to Curlew, which functioned as a saw mill.

==== The Bodie Mine ====
North of Bodie Washington on Toroda Road, is the 1897, five-patent Bodie Mining Company claim, later owned by the Northern Gold Company and Toroda Mines Inc. Toroda Road bisects the appealing remnants of this mining camp, whose apparent ghost town is often confused with the original "old" Bodie Washington. The mine consists of an array of hard rock stopes and tunnels, penetrating a mineralized vein running the length of a ridge rising from Toroda Creek. The Washington State Department of Natural Resources did an in-depth report on this mine, and other properties in the region. Mining operations ceased during World War II, as extraction of essential wartime metals took priority by Government Order L-208 of the War Production Board. A stock certificate signed by president L.S. Kurtz indicates the mine's net worth to be US$1,500,000 in 1903. The Bodie Mine is currently held in quiescence by the Geomineral Corporation. The property has been continuously occupied since its discovery. 48.830569 (Latitude) -118.89055 (Longitude).

==== Bodie, California ====
The Mine and the related city of Bodie, California, was named after its original claim holder, William S. Bodey, whose eponym was changed as his tent city was underway, as an anonymous sign painter assumed the spelling of Bodie would wear better with time.

== More information ==
"On the Republic-Chesaw wagon road, twenty-four miles northwest of Republic, is Bodie camp, in Okanogan county, the principal property being the BODIE mine. Shipments made to the Granby smelter, Grand Forks, B. C., showed values of $500 per ton. The GOLDEN REWARD group of claims was operated by a company of Spokane men, the mine being under the management of R. E. WILLOUGHBY. An assay of $97 was obtained from an open cut."

== Bibliography ==
- Jerry Smith, "Boom Towns and Relic Hunters of Northeastern Washington" Publisher: The Elfin Cove Press, Bellevue, WA, 2002. 124 pages
- Fritz Wolff, Matthew Brookshier, Donald McKay Jr. David Norman, "INACTIVE AND ABANDONED MINE LANDS—Bodie Mine, Wauconda Mining District, Okanogan County, Washington" Washington Division of Geology and Earth Resources, Olympia, WA, Circular 106, November 2007. 16 pages
- Garret Romaine, "Mining the Internet: Republic, Washington" (published on-line) www.ghosttownsusa.com/gpm406.doc 4 pages
- Wayne S. Moen and Marshall T. Hunting HANDBOOK FOR GOLD PROSPECTORS IN WASHINGTON, State of Washington, Department of Natural Resources, Division of Geology and Earth Resources, Information Circular No. 57, Feb 1986 Pages, 50, 51, 62
- The Dwight E. Woodbridge Report, Historical document
