= Rosa May =

American prostitute (1855–1911/2)

Rosa Elizabeth White (January 1855 – 1911/2), known as Rosa May, was a prostitute during the late 19th century and early 20th century who lived in the Virginia City, Nevada and Bodie, California areas. A local legend states that she selflessly nursed sick miners during an epidemic and succumbed to the illness herself. Because of this, she has been referred to as the "hooker with a heart of gold".

== Biography ==
=== Early life ===
Rosa's parents were Irish immigrants. In 1871 she ran away from her home in Pennsylvania and from 1871 to 1873, she began her career of prostitution. It appears that she began her trade in New York City, and then drifted through Colorado and Idaho. She first appears in Virginia City in 1873 and worked in brothels throughout the Carson City, Reno, Virginia City area.

=== Virginia City years ===
From 1873 to 1888, Rosa circulated in Virginia City and Carson City. The majority of her time was spent in Virginia City where she worked for Virginia City madam, Cad Thompson, (Sarah Higgins). Rosa was a favored employee and often was left in charge of the brothel during Cad's trips to San Francisco.

=== Bodie years ===
From 1888 to the early 1890s, she traveled to and from Bodie, California and eventually settled there in 1893. She appears on the 1900 census records. Land records from 1902 show that Rosa purchased a house in Bodie's "Red Light District" for $175.

There are no records of Rosa May living in Bodie after the 1910 census. The only evidence that she is buried in Bodie is a photo illustrating the Rosa May piece from Ella Cain's 1956 book, The Story of Bodie. This photo shows a decrepit wooden fence surrounding an otherwise unmarked grave. Since Ella Cain's biographical sketch of Rosa May is mostly fiction, it is likely the photo was chosen for its picturesque qualities. Author George Williams III conducted an exhaustive search in the 1970s for Rosa May's death records and found nothing.

Bodie was declining rapidly during the period that Rosa May disappeared, and it may be that she left the area in search of greener pastures. Her supposed resting place in Bodie is a popular tourist destination for those exploring the former Bodie State Park.

=== Behind the myth ===
In her book, The Story of Bodie, author Ella Cain relates the story of the epidemic and Rosa succumbing to the same illness that had stricken the miners for whom she was caring. Other resident's accounts and external records refute that there was any type of epidemic during the winter of 1911–1912.

Letters, diaries, and handwriting analysis, indicate that she was a charming person, took an interest in others, but was somewhat volatile emotionally. There appears to have been a serious or traumatic event, (or events), in her early years but no record exists of what it could have been.

Official documentation about Rosa's life, (birth and death records, etc.), are either missing or non-existent, but extensive research done by author George Williams III provides some basic facts and general information about her. His research is documented in the book Rosa May: The Search for A Mining Camp Legend.

Her story is dramatized in the musical play, Nevada Belle by George Morgan and Duane Ashby.
