= Geo-Mineral Exploration Corporation =

Geo-Mineral Exploration Corporation is an environmentally-sensitive exploration, acquisition, and merger company, which examines the viability of consolidating historic underground mining properties into small-scale specialty production alliances. The Geo-Mineral Corporation and its independent affiliates, are fully American-owned and operated.

== History ==
The Geo-Mineral Exploration Corporation was formed in 1968, as a limited partnership of twelve mining-industry professionals. In 1969, with claims to three properties in hand, the Geo-Mineral partnership converted all shares to simple, and preferred stock certificates, as the board unanimously voted to change its structure into that of a Corporation. Geo-Mineral Exploration Corporation (also known as Geo, Geomineral, and Geomineral Exp.) focused on the identification, isolation, improvement, and marketing of a wide variety of mineral properties in Washington, Alaska, Canada, and Nevada, pursuing copper, uranium, nickel, coal, magnetite, lead, silver, and gold. In 1970, having narrowed its focus to three properties from assays and leads of prospectors aligned with Caravan LTD, the board voted to purchase one prospect outright, a five-patent mining claim group East of Bodie, Washington.

=== Corporate consolidation ===
Throughout the 1970s, Geo-Mineral slowly shifted its priorities to three primary assets, liquidating subsidiary holdings, and refining its specific focus to precious metals. The corporation filed for sub-chapter 1 (S) status, after the untimely deaths of several officers and board members during a lengthy lawsuit against Cascade Resources for breach of contract. Geo-Mineral was forced at this time to close its Republic office, and shrink its holdings to the one eighty-five acre Bodie Mine Group.

=== The Bodie complex ===
Depressed precious metal prices curtailed further exploration and expansion until 1982, when a great spike of interest, and exploratory work was undertaken. Numerous lease options were entertained, diamond drilling undertaken, and many claims were staked around the larger Bodie property in anticipation of its historic mines' reopening, but the later precipitous drop in the price of gold shelved all plans for large-scale development. This ushered the corporation into a prolonged term of quiescence, awaiting a similar rise in the price of precious metals.

=== Reorganization ===
In 2009, longstanding president Fritz M. Hanson tendered his resignation, prompting elections and the decision to re-file as a corporation under the original 1970 bylaws and charter. Geo-Mineral Exploration Inc. seeks to consolidate its earlier-researched or held primary properties into a strategic web of mineral resources aligned with other small, private mining operations. Final board appointments, and related secondary elections occurred in October 2009 leading to internal reorganization in 2010.
