= Bodie Mine =

Gold mine in Washington, United States

- Location within Washington (state) Location within the United States
- Location: Okanogan County, Washington; 48°49′50″N 118°53′26″W
- Products: Gold
- Opened: 1896
- Closed: 1941

The Bodie Mine is an inactive, privately owned gold mine in Okanogan County, Washington, United States. It is located within a triangle formed by the town of Wauconda, Washington the original town of Bodie, Washington, and the later ghost town of Bodie, on Toroda Road.

== History ==
The Bodie Mine played an historically important part of the Okanogan gold rush. Founded by Henry Dewitz after the Northern Colville Reservation was opened for mining in 1896. The Bodie Mine was started in 1897 to mine a block of five patented claims (Bodie, Bodie #2, West Cliff, Crystal Bluff, and Little George). Dewitz sold the claim to his brother Ben who in 1902 sold to the Wrigley family. The Wrigleys, famous for their gum and Chicago baseball team, built the steam-powered mill and established what became The Bodie Mining Company. A stock certificate signed in 1903 by then president L.S. Kurtz indicates the mine's net worth to be US $1,500,000.

Mined continuously until 1916, the claim produced a reported $130,000 of gold at the then-price of $20.67 an ounce. During that period, ownership passed through a series of companies including Bodie Mining and Transportation Co (1907–09), Duluth-Toroda Mining Co (1910–12) and the Toroda Development Co (1915–16). After being shut down until 1934, the Northern Gold Company took over operations and rebuilt the mill in 1935. Employing as many as 40 miners working three shifts a day, an estimated 50,000 short tons of ore were mined, producing another $280,000 (13,500 ozt) in gold. All mining ceased in 1941 during World War II, as extraction of essential wartime metals took priority by Government Order L-208 of the War Production Board.

In 1970 the Geomineral Corporation acquired the five patented claims, including The Bodie Mine and remains the owner. Several lease-option agreements occurred in the late 1970s, and early 1980s during the related spike in gold prices, but no mining or development has transpired on the property since that time.

== Geology ==
The mine consists of hard rock stopes and tunnels, exploring a mineralized vein which runs the length of the ridge rising from Toroda Creek, experts suspect may be up to a half mile wide, and over a mile deep. Approximately 4,500 feet (1,400 m) of tunnels and shafts were dug into the hill side at its 100, 200, 250, 400 and 700-foot (210 m) levels. Several openings remain but all are extremely hazardous and should not be approached or entered under any circumstances. The Washington State Department of Natural Resources did an in-depth report on The Bodie Mine and other properties in the region. This site was found to be similar to epithermal hot spring type gold deposits found in Stevens and Ferry Counties, and has been compared in magnitude to the newly reopened Buckhorn Mountain mine, near the Canada–US border. The Bodie vein is a series of parallel quartz stringers or veinlets separated by narrow bands of highly altered and pyritized andesite/dacite. The ore consists of microscopic particles of free gold and/or electrum, gold selenide, and gold-bearing sulfides found in a banded quartz vein five to 22 feet (6.7 m) wide. In some places, the quartz is chalcedonic in structure; in others, it is crustiform and contains late-stage calcite. Recent chemical analyses of the Bodie ore indicate that the mineralization is more complex than previously imagined, and assays have shown favorable results of several precious metals throughout the property.

Washington State Geologist Wayne Moen, in his 1980 report, notes:

The Bodie vein is a persistent quartz fissure gold-bearing that has been partially mined. Although gold has been mined for up to a thousand feet along the strike of the vein, the vein has yet to be tested over its total length, which is excess of 6,000 feet. Based on past mining and sampling by mining companies, remaining parts of the vein in existing underground workings will probably average 0.15 ounces per ton in gold and 0.75 ounce in silver, but higher value can be expected in near surface parts of the vein. The Bodie Breccia which may exceed 50 million tons, is mineralized with gold and silver. Assays of the breccia in the upper levels of the mine have run as high as 0.23 ounce per ton in gold.

The potentially large quantity of ore posited by Moen remains unverified beneath fifteen hundred feet.

== Surface facilities ==
Though once a thriving (relocated) town of 300 people supporting an array of mines, nothing beyond a few ruined upper buildings and block foundations remain on the property of its extensive mill, once a 1962 fire destroyed the mine's working infrastructure. Remnants of its picturesque, eponymous ghost town, including the bunkhouse, school, kitchen and assay office, are bisected by Torada Road. Toroda Creek, which runs through the property, has been tested by the D.O.E. and the water has determined to be of good quality, possessing rare bullhead trout, and rich in micronutrients. Well established cottonwood trees and a thick stands of grass and now cover the 6.5 acres (26,000 m^{2}) of stable tailings. The surrounding area remains sparsely populated, controlled by the B.L.M., the Washington Department of Natural Resources and a few private holdings. The property has two caretakers living on or near the site, and has supported grazing stock for decades.
