= W. S. Bodey =

American gold prospector

W. S. Bodey (c. 1814 – 1859) was a prospector from Poughkeepsie, New York who discovered gold in Eastern California. He is notable as the namesake of Bodie in Mono County, California.

== Biography ==
Bodey's exact first name is uncertain. His name could be William, Waterman or Wakeman. In Poughkeepsie he owned his own business and was listed in the 1843 Poughkeepsie village directory. In the 1845 edition, he is listed as a tin manufacturer with his shop address of 345 Main Street. He is also listed in this same directory as having a home on the corner of South Hamilton and Montgomery streets. The 1850 United States census lists "Wakeman T. Bodey," born about 1814, as a tinsmith living in Poughkeepsie with Sarah Bodey and four young children.

Although Bodey was well respected within the community of Poughkeepsie, he desired a more adventurous life. In 1848, after receiving news of gold being discovered in California, Bodey said goodbye to his wife Sarah and his two children, and set sail for California and its gold on the Mathew Vasser. After rounding Cape Horn, Bodey landed in San Francisco in 1849.

In 1859, Bodey discovered gold in Eastern California, north of Mono Lake. This discovery sparked a gold rush; the town of Bodie, California sprang up around Bodey's discovery. Bodey did not profit from the discovery however. He died in November 1859, after he decided to winter near his find with a Native American companion. He and his companion went out to make a supply trip to Monoville and got lost in a blizzard. When Bodey couldn't go any further, his companion left him and Bodey froze to death. Bodey's body was found the next spring.
