= Bodie, California =

Ghost town in Mono County, California, US

Bodie
- Ghost town
- View west along Green Street

- Location within California Location within the United States
- Coordinates: 38°12′44″N 119°00′44″W
- Country: United States
- State: California
- County: Mono
- Founded: 1876
- Elevation: 8,379 ft (2,554 m)

Population (2020)
  - Total: 11
- Time zone: UTC−8 (Pacific)
  - Summer (DST): UTC−7 (PDT)
- Area codes: 442/760
- Climate: Dsc
- Website: Bodie State Historic Park
- Bodie Historic District
- U.S. National Register of Historic Places
- U.S. National Historic Landmark District
- California Historical Landmark No. 341
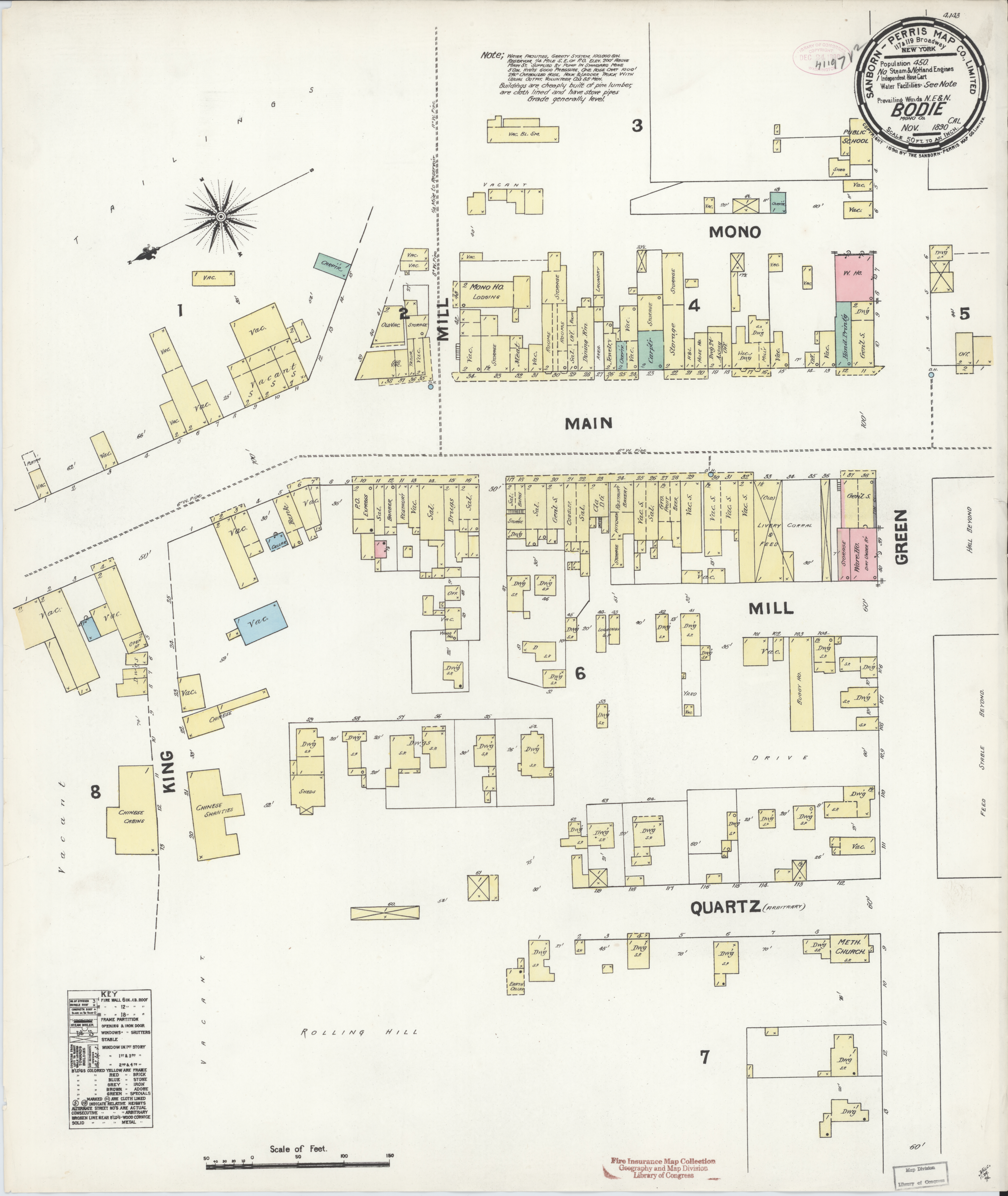
- Map of Bodie, as of 1890
- Location: California
- Nearest city: Bridgeport, California
- Architectural style: Various; Southwestern U.S. frontier-style, late-19th to early-20th century.
- NRHP reference No.: 66000213
- CHISL No.: 341

Significant dates
- Added to NRHP: October 15, 1966
- Designated NHLD: July 4, 1961

Bodie (/ˈboʊdiː/ BOH-dee) is a ghost town in the Bodie Hills, east of the Sierra Nevada, in Mono County, California, United States. It is about 75 miles (121 km) southeast of Lake Tahoe, and 12 mi (19 km) east-southeast of Bridgeport, at an elevation of 8,379 feet (2,554 m). Bodie became a boom town in 1876 after the discovery of a profitable vein of gold; by 1879 it had 2,000 structures and a population of roughly 8,000 people.

The town went into decline in the subsequent decades and came to be described as a ghost town by 1915. The U.S. Department of the Interior recognizes the designated Bodie Historic District as a National Historic Landmark.

Also registered as a California Historical Landmark, the ghost town officially was established as Bodie State Historic Park in 1962. It receives about 200,000 visitors yearly. Bodie State Historic Park is partly supported by the Bodie Foundation.

== History ==
=== Discovery of gold ===
Bodie began as a mining camp of little note following the discovery of gold in 1859 by a group of prospectors, including W. S. Bodey. Bodey died in a blizzard the following November while making a supply trip to Monoville (near present-day Mono City), never able to see the rise of the town that was named after him. According to area pioneer Judge J. G. McClinton, the district's name had been "Bodey," "Body," and a few other orthographic variations. After a painter in the nearby boomtown of Aurora lettered a sign "Bodie Stables," it was then standardized to "Bodie."

Gold discovered at Bodie coincided with the discovery of silver at nearby Aurora (thought to be in California, later found to be Nevada), and the distant Comstock Lode beneath Virginia City, Nevada. But while these two towns boomed, interest in Bodie remained lackluster. By 1868 only two companies had built stamp mills at Bodie, and both had failed.

=== Boom ===
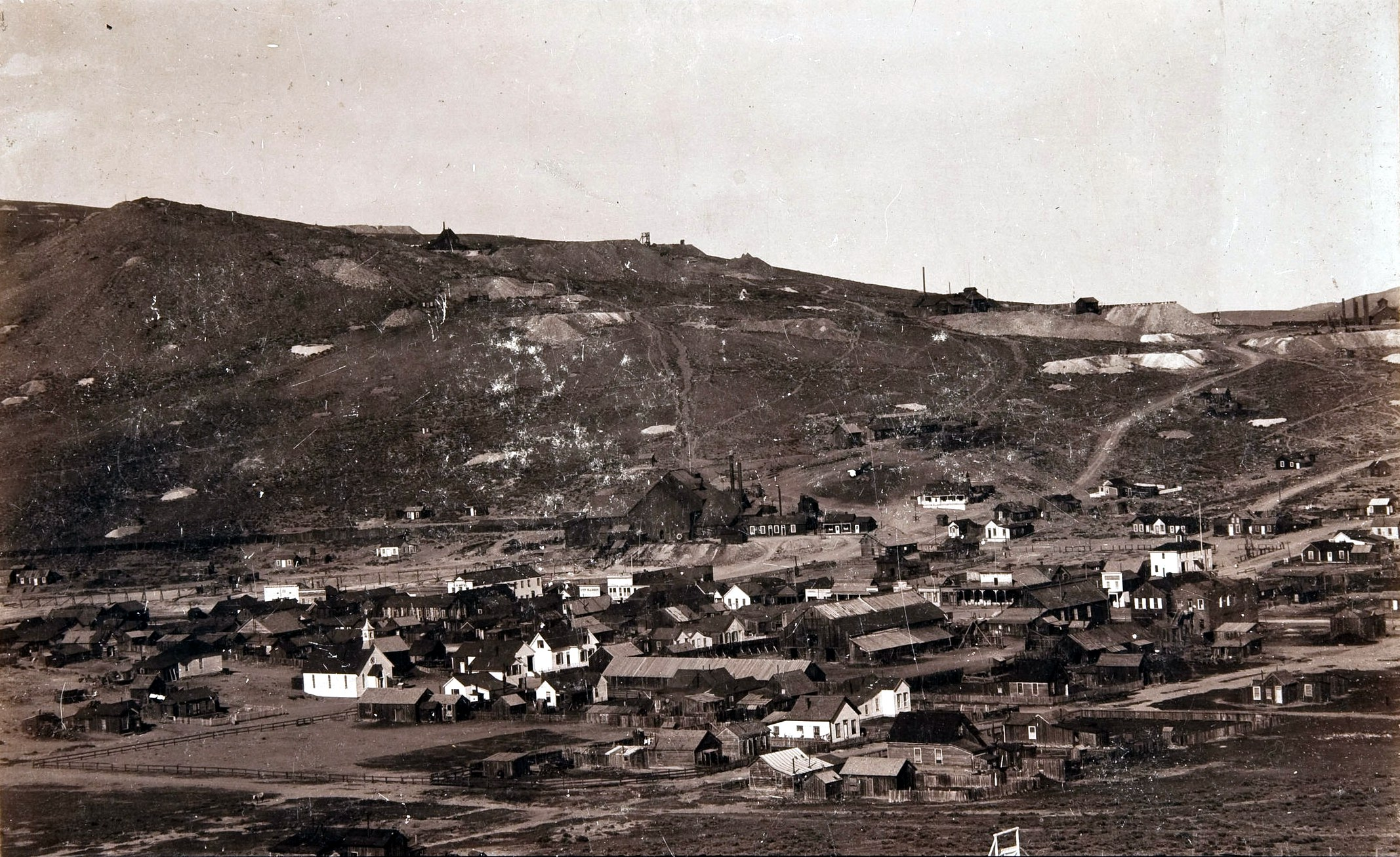
c. 1890

In 1876, the Standard Company discovered a profitable deposit of gold-bearing ore, which transformed Bodie from an isolated mining camp comprising a few prospectors and company employees to a Wild West boomtown. Rich discoveries in the adjacent Bodie Mine during 1878 attracted even more hopeful people. By 1879, Bodie had a population of approximately 7,000–10,000 people and around 2,000 buildings. One legend says that in 1880, Bodie was California's second or third largest city, but the U.S. Census of that year disproves this. Over the years 1860–1941 Bodie's mines produced gold and silver valued at an estimated US$34 million (in 1986 dollars, or $100 million in 2025).

Bodie boomed from late 1877 through mid– to late 1880. The first newspaper, The Standard Pioneer Journal of Mono County, published its first edition on October 10, 1877. Starting as a weekly, it soon expanded publication to three times a week. It was also during this time that a telegraph line was built which connected Bodie with Bridgeport and Genoa, Nevada. California and Nevada newspapers predicted Bodie would become the next Comstock Lode. Men from both states were lured to Bodie by the prospect of another bonanza.

Gold bullion from the town's nine stamp mills was shipped to Carson City, Nevada, by way of Aurora, Wellington, and Gardnerville. Most shipments were accompanied by armed guards. After the bullion reached Carson City, it was delivered to the mint there, or sent by rail to the mint in San Francisco.

=== Districts and amenities ===
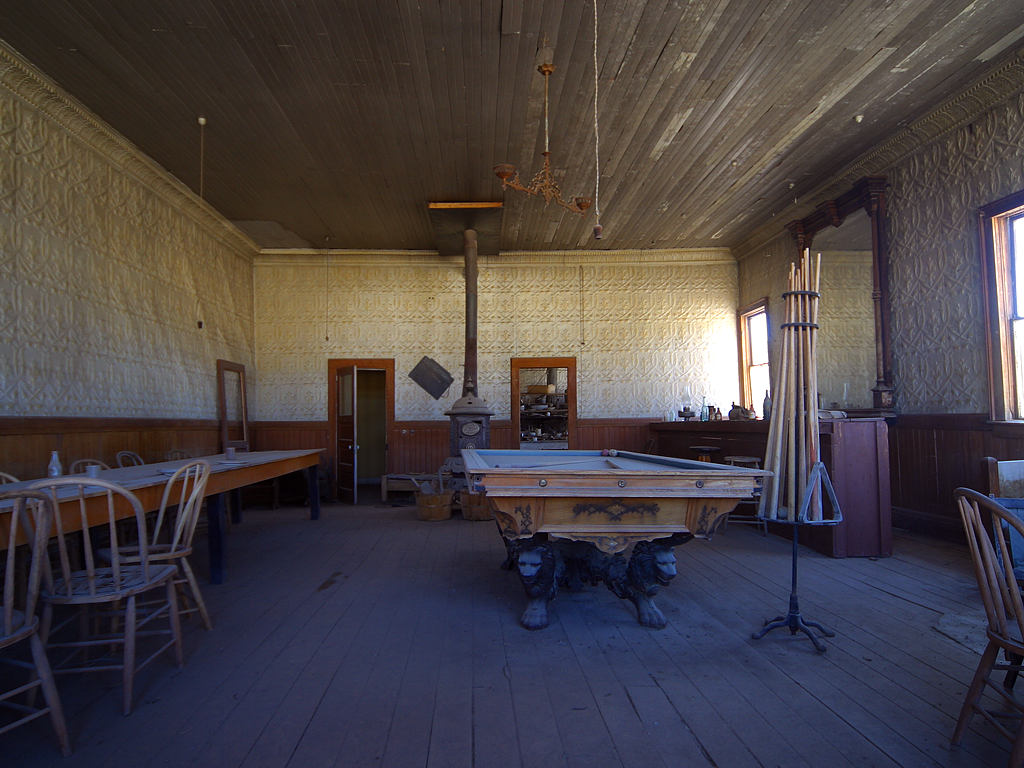
A saloon

As a bustling gold mining center, Bodie had the amenities of larger towns, including a Wells Fargo Bank, four volunteer fire companies, a brass band, railroad, miners' and mechanics' union, several daily newspapers, and a jail. At its peak, 65 saloons lined Main Street, which was a mile long. Murders, shootouts, barroom brawls, and stagecoach holdups were regular occurrences.

As with other remote mining towns, Bodie had a popular, though clandestine, red light district on the north end of town. There is an unsubstantiated story of Rosa May, a prostitute who, in the style of Florence Nightingale, came to the aid of the town's menfolk when a serious epidemic struck the town at the height of its boom. She is credited with giving life-saving care to many, but after she died she was buried outside the cemetery fence.

Bodie had a Chinatown, the main street of which ran at a right angle to Bodie's Main Street. At one point it had several hundred Chinese residents and a Taoist temple. Opium dens were plentiful in this area.

Bodie also had a cemetery on the outskirts of town and a nearby mortuary. It is the only building in the town built of red brick three courses thick, most likely for insulation to keep the air temperature steady during the cold winters and hot summers. The cemetery includes a Miners Union section, and a cenotaph erected to honor President James A. Garfield. The Bodie Boot Hill was located outside of the official city cemetery.

On Main Street stands the Miners Union Hall, which was the meeting place for labor unions. It also served as an entertainment center that hosted dances, concerts, plays, and school recitals. It now serves as a museum.

=== Mining town ===
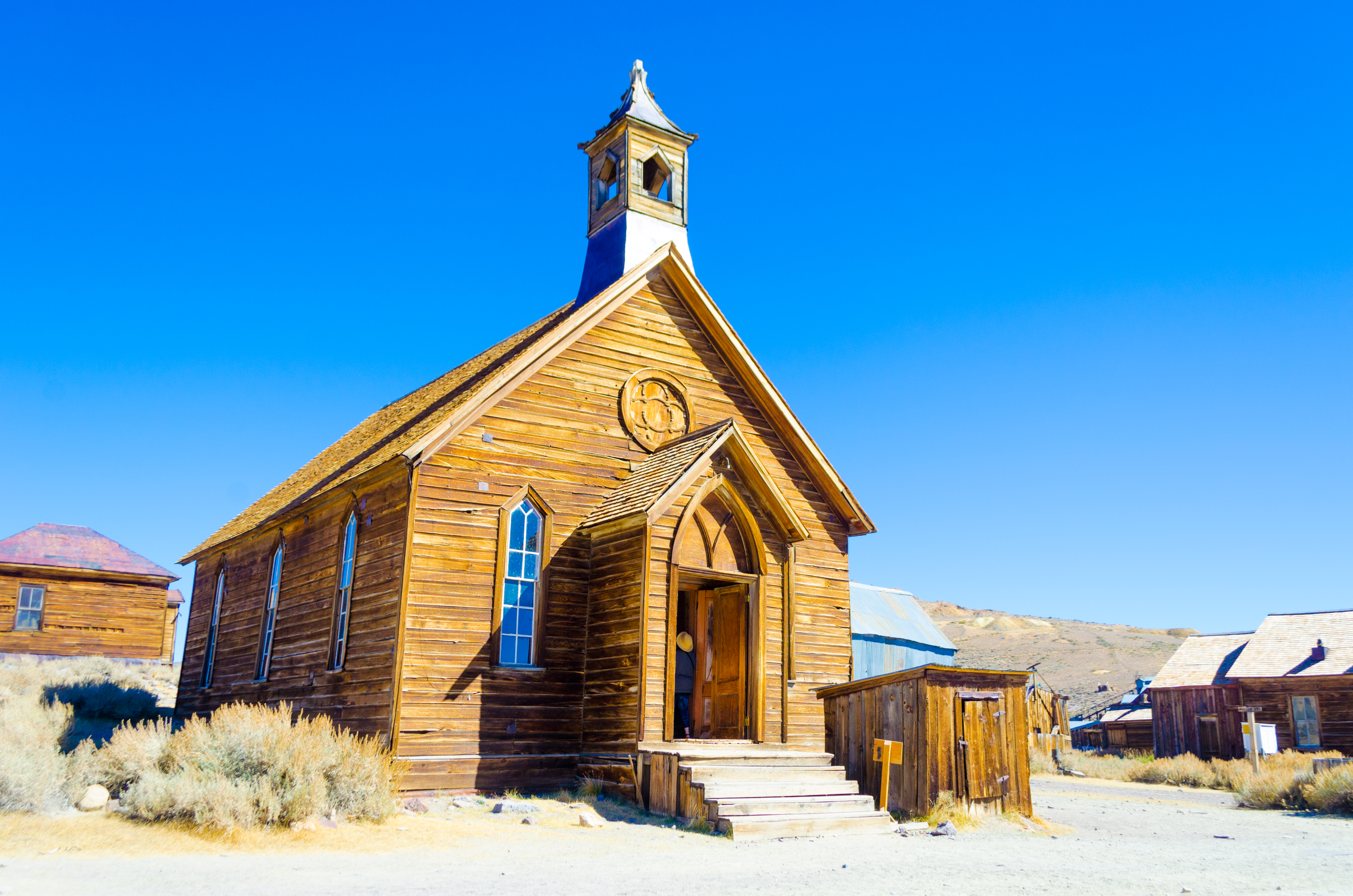
The Methodist Church

The first signs of decline appeared in 1880 and became obvious toward the end of the year. Promising mining booms in Butte, Montana; Tombstone, Arizona; and Utah lured men away from Bodie. The get-rich-quick, single miners who came to the town in the 1870s moved on to these other booms, and Bodie developed into a family-oriented community. In 1882 residents built the Methodist Church (which still stands) and the Roman Catholic Church (burned 1928). Despite the population decline, the mines were flourishing, and in 1881 Bodie's ore production was recorded at a high of $3.1 million. Also in 1881, a narrow-gauge railroad was built called the Bodie Railway & Lumber Company, bringing lumber, cordwood, and mine timbers to the mining district from Mono Mills south of Mono Lake.

During the early 1890s, Bodie enjoyed a short revival from technological advancements in the mines that continued to support the town. In 1890, the recently invented cyanide process promised to recover gold and silver from discarded mill tailings and from low-grade ore bodies that had been passed over. In 1892, the Standard Company built its own hydroelectric plant approximately 13 miles (20.9 km) away at Dynamo Pond. The plant developed a maximum of 130 horsepower (97 kW) and 3,530 volts alternating current (AC) to power the company's 20-stamp mill. This pioneering installation marked the country's first transmissions of electricity over a long distance.

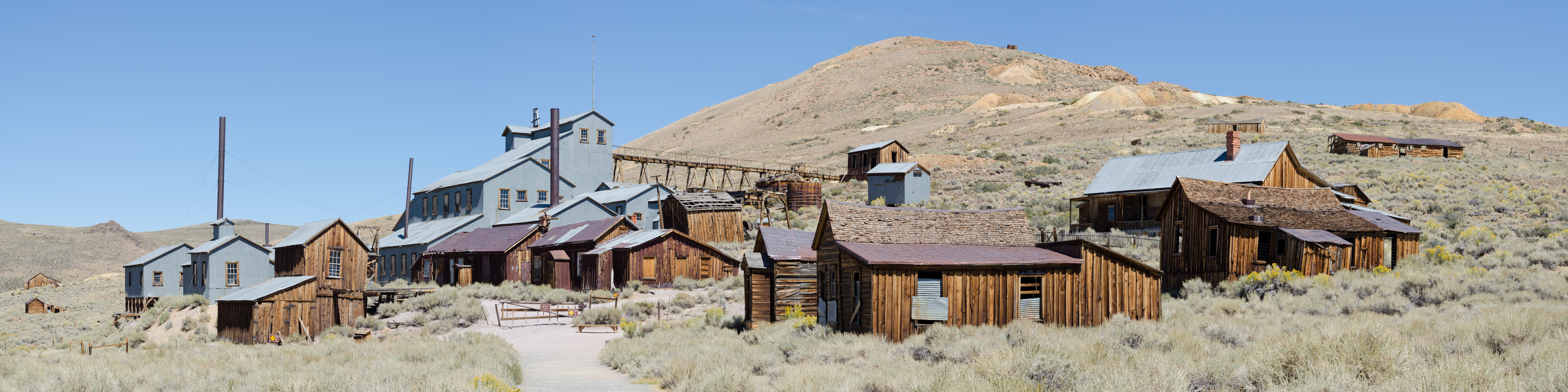
Standard Consolidated Mining Company Stamp Mill

In 1910, the population was recorded at 698 people, which were predominantly families who decided to stay in Bodie instead of moving on to other prosperous strikes.

=== Decline ===
Historical population
Census	Pop.	Note	%±
1880	5,417		—
1890	779		−85.6%
1900	965		23.9%
1910	698		−27.7%
1920	110		−84.2%
1930	228		107.3%
1940	90		−60.5%
1950	0		−100.0%
1951-2018 (est.)	0

The last issue of The Bodie Miner, the local newspaper, appeared in 1912. In a 1913 book titled California Tourist Guide and Handbook: Authentic Description of Routes of Travel and Points of Interest in California, the authors, Wells and Aubrey Drury, described Bodie as a "mining town, which is the center of a large mineral region". They referred to two hotels and a railroad operating there. In 1913, the Standard Consolidated Mine closed.

Mining profits in 1914 were at a low of $6,821 (~$161,723 in 2025). James S. Cain bought everything from the town lots to the mining claims, and reopened the Standard mill to former employees, which resulted in an over $100,000 profit in 1915. However, this financial growth was not in time to stop the town's decline. In 1917, the Bodie Railway was abandoned and its iron tracks were scrapped.

The last mine closed in 1942, due to War Production Board order L-208, shutting down all non-essential gold mines in the United States during World War II. Mining never resumed after the war.

Bodie was first described as a "ghost town" in 1915. In a time when auto travel was on the rise, many travelers reached Bodie via automobiles. The San Francisco Chronicle published an article in 1919 to dispute the "ghost town" label.

By 1920, Bodie's population was recorded by the US Federal Census at a total of 120 people. Despite the decline and a severe fire in the business district in 1932, Bodie had permanent residents through nearly half of the 20th century. A post office operated at Bodie from 1877 to 1942.

=== Ghost town and park ===
In the 1940s, the threat of vandalism faced the ghost town. The Cain family, who owned much of the land, hired caretakers to protect and to maintain the town's structures. Martin Gianettoni, one of the last three people living in Bodie in 1943, was a caretaker.

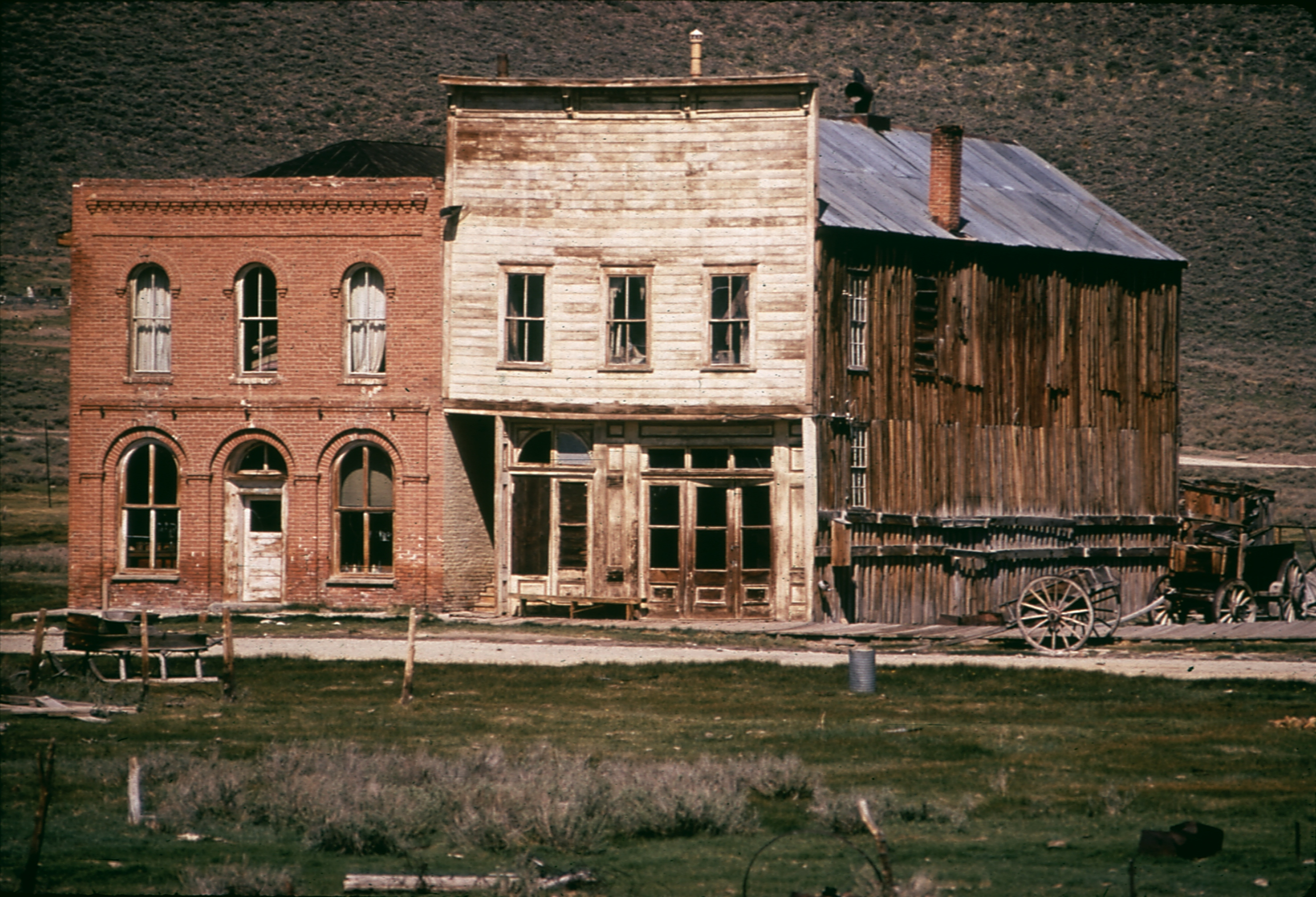
Bodie in May 1972

Bodie is now an authentic Wild West ghost town.

The town was designated a National Historic Landmark in 1961, and in 1962 the state legislature authorized creation of Bodie State Historic Park. A total of 170 buildings remained. Bodie has been named as California's official state gold rush ghost town.

Visitors arrive mainly via SR 270, which runs from US 395 near Bridgeport to the west; the last three miles of it is a dirt road. There is also a road to SR 167 near Mono Lake in the south, but this road is extremely rough, with more than 10 miles of dirt track in a bad state of repair. Due to heavy snowfall, the roads to Bodie are usually closed in winter.

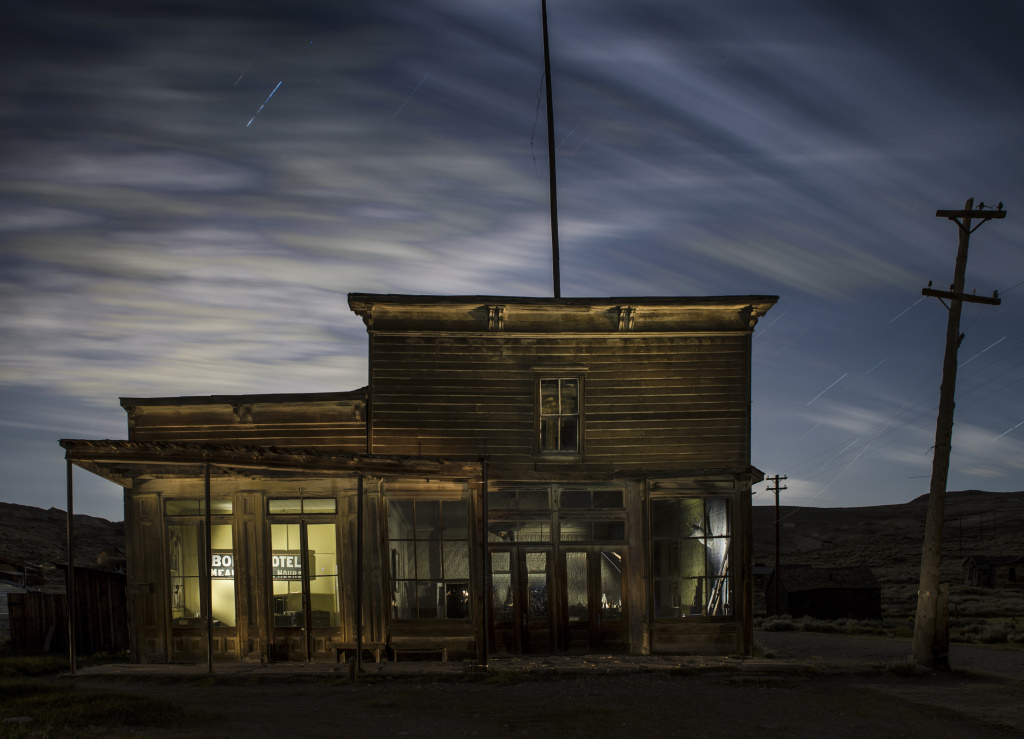
Bodie is a popular destination for organized night photography, emphasizing the eerie nature of the park.

Today, Bodie is preserved in a state of arrested decay. Only a small part of the town survived, with about 110 structures still standing, including one of many once operational gold mills. Visitors can walk the deserted streets of a town that once was a bustling area of activity. Interiors remain as they were left and stocked with goods. Littered throughout the park, one can find small shards of china dishes, square nails, and an occasional bottle, but removing these items is illegal.

The California State Parks' ranger station is located in one of the original homes on Green Street.

In 2009 and again in 2010, Bodie was scheduled to be closed. The California state legislature worked out a budget compromise that enabled the state's Parks Closure Commission to keep it open. As of 2024, the park is still operating, now administered by the Bodie Foundation.

== Climate ==
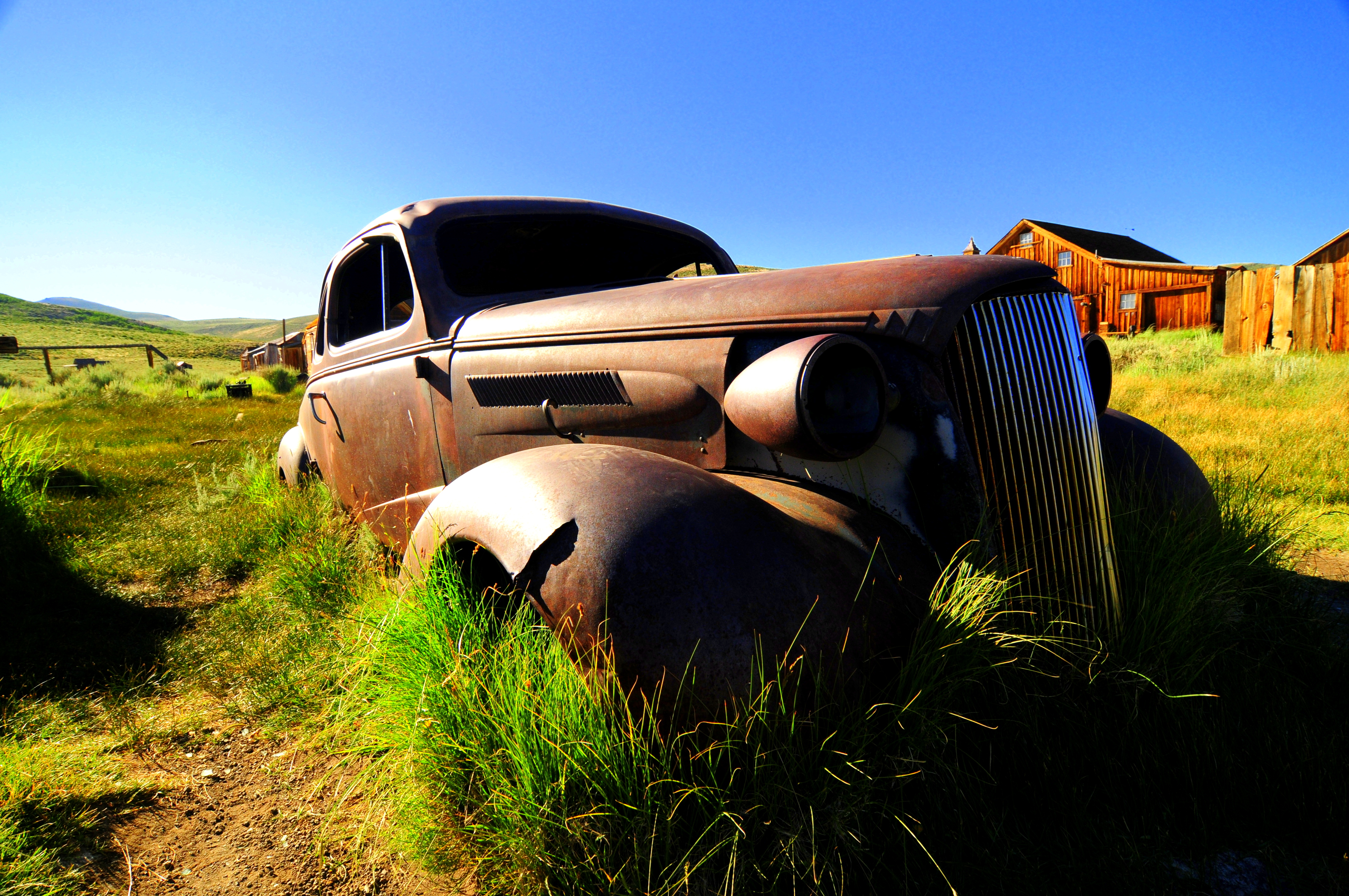
Bodie has many abandoned artifacts, such as this 1937 Chevrolet coupe.

Bodie is a rare example of the dry-summer subarctic climate (Köppen climate classification Dsc), with hot to freezing summers and long, snowy winters, and is part of USDA Plant Hardiness Zone 5. Winds can sweep across the valley at close to 100 miles per hour (160 km/h). Nights remain cold even through the summer, often dropping well below freezing throughout the year.

With an average of 303 nights below freezing per year, Bodie rivals Utqiagvik, Alaska's 315, and no month has ever been completely frost-free. The fewest nights below freezing in a month was two, the exceptionally warm August 1967, whose mean minimum of 38.8 °F or 3.8 °C was the highest during the twentieth century, although July 1896 had a mean minimum of 41.4 °F or 5.2 °C. Bodie's actual highest minimum on record is 60 °F (15.6 °C) on August 1, 1968; however, on average only two nights per year stay above 50 °F (10 °C), and minima that high have never occurred between September 14 and June 4.

The longest frost-free period is a mere thirty days from July 20 to August 18, 1901, but to illustrate the vast diurnal temperature range, Bodie had as many as 98 consecutive maxima at or above 68 °F (20 °C) between June 9 and September 14, 2007 – which included the record hot July 2007 with mean maximum 82.1 °F or 27.8 °C.

The harsh weather is due to a particular combination of high altitude (8,400 feet or 2,600 meters) and a very exposed plateau, with little in the way of a natural surrounding wall to protect the long, flat piece of land from the elements. Plenty of firewood was needed to keep residents warm through the long winters. Bodie is not located in a forest, so lumber had to be imported from Bridgeport, Benton, Carson City, or Mono Mills. The winter of 1878–79 was particularly harsh and deadly. On average, there are 22.7 days with 80 °F (26.7 °C)+ highs, 19.6 days where the high fails to rise above freezing, and 35 nights with sub-0 °F (−17.8 °C) lows. The record high temperature of 91 °F (32.8 °C) was set on July 21, 1988, while the record low of −36 °F (−37.8 °C) was set on February 13, 1903, which also saw the lowest maximum temperature of −4 °F (−20.0 °C).

Average annual precipitation is 11.79 inches (299.5 mm), with August on average being the driest month and January the wettest. There are an average of 60 days annually with measurable precipitation. The wettest "rain year" was from July 1968 to June 1969 with 22.18 in (563.4 mm) and the driest was from July 1999 to June 2000 with 6.24 in (158.5 mm). The most precipitation in one month was 7.39 in (187.7 mm) in January 1901, and the most in 24 hours 4.57 in (116.1 mm) on February 12, 1895. Average annual snowfall is 93.2 inches (2.37 m). The snowiest year was 1965 with 269 in (6.83 m). The most snow in one month was 97.1 in (2.47 m) in January 1969.

Climate data for Bodie, California (1991–2020 normals, extremes 1895–present)
Month	Jan	Feb	Mar	Apr	May	Jun	Jul	Aug	Sep	Oct	Nov	Dec	Year
Record high °F (°C)	61 (16)	63 (17)	68 (20)	77 (25)	82 (28)	90 (32)	91 (33)	89 (32)	88 (31)	81 (27)	71 (22)	64 (18)	91 (33)
Mean maximum °F (°C)	53.0 (11.7)	53.4 (11.9)	58.3 (14.6)	66.4 (19.1)	73.9 (23.3)	81.2 (27.3)	85.1 (29.5)	83.6 (28.7)	79.9 (26.6)	72.9 (22.7)	64.3 (17.9)	54.0 (12.2)	86.0 (30.0)
Mean daily maximum °F (°C)	40.9 (4.9)	41.1 (5.1)	45.3 (7.4)	51.0 (10.6)	60.9 (16.1)	70.8 (21.6)	78.3 (25.7)	77.5 (25.3)	71.1 (21.7)	60.8 (16.0)	49.4 (9.7)	40.9 (4.9)	57.3 (14.1)
Daily mean °F (°C)	24.2 (−4.3)	24.9 (−3.9)	29.0 (−1.7)	34.9 (1.6)	43.0 (6.1)	51.3 (10.7)	57.2 (14.0)	55.5 (13.1)	49.5 (9.7)	40.3 (4.6)	30.8 (−0.7)	24.2 (−4.3)	38.7 (3.7)
Mean daily minimum °F (°C)	7.5 (−13.6)	8.8 (−12.9)	12.8 (−10.7)	18.8 (−7.3)	25.1 (−3.8)	31.7 (−0.2)	36.1 (2.3)	33.6 (0.9)	27.8 (−2.3)	19.8 (−6.8)	12.2 (−11.0)	7.6 (−13.6)	20.2 (−6.6)
Mean minimum °F (°C)	−15.0 (−26.1)	−12.6 (−24.8)	−7.8 (−22.1)	2.9 (−16.2)	10.5 (−11.9)	15.6 (−9.1)	22.5 (−5.3)	20.5 (−6.4)	14.0 (−10.0)	2.9 (−16.2)	−7.7 (−22.1)	−14.1 (−25.6)	−19.8 (−28.8)
Record low °F (°C)	−27 (−33)	−36 (−38)	−22 (−30)	−13 (−25)	−4 (−20)	2 (−17)	12 (−11)	12 (−11)	1 (−17)	−13 (−25)	−25 (−32)	−31 (−35)	−36 (−38)
Average precipitation inches (mm)	1.79 (45)	1.50 (38)	1.31 (33)	0.98 (25)	1.14 (29)	0.57 (14)	0.63 (16)	0.60 (15)	0.22 (5.6)	0.52 (13)	0.96 (24)	1.60 (41)	11.82 (300)
Average snowfall inches (cm)	17.4 (44)	14.5 (37)	22.3 (57)	5.8 (15)	4.5 (11)	0.6 (1.5)	0.0 (0.0)	0.0 (0.0)	0.1 (0.25)	2.5 (6.4)	10.6 (27)	15.6 (40)	93.9 (239)
Average extreme snow depth inches (cm)	21 (53)	25 (64)	28 (71)	16 (41)	5 (13)	0 (0)	0 (0)	0 (0)	0 (0)	2 (5.1)	7 (18)	14 (36)	28 (71)
Average precipitation days (≥ 0.01 in)	7.1	7.0	5.9	5.5	4.6	3.6	3.5	3.1	2.0	3.1	4.7	7.4	57.5
Average snowy days (≥ 0.1 in)	4.5	3.6	4.6	3.6	1.9	0.5	0.0	0.0	0.1	0.8	2.8	5.2	27.6
Source: NOAA

== In fiction ==
- Bodie was the setting for the young reader's novel Behind the Masks, by Susan Patron.
- Kathleen Haun's historical novel No Trees for Shade (2013) is set in Bodie in 1880.
- Key incidents in Chapter One of James Rollins' tenth Sigma Force novel, The Sixth Extinction (2014), span nearby Mono Lake, the secret military testing site neighboring Bodie Park, and the ghost town itself, where terrorists attack a National Park Service Ranger and details unfold about both the area's significance to the rest of the plot.
- Bodie is the setting for the Kristiana Gregory book Orphan Runaways (1998).

== See also ==
- Bodie, Washington
- List of California state parks
- Rosa May
- Madame Moustache

== Bibliography ==
- Calloway, R.A. (1979). Bodie State Historic Park: resource management plan, general development plan and environmental impact report. Sacramento: Calif. Dept. of Parks and Recreation. OCLC 21629664.
- Jackson, W.T. (1962). Historical material on the mining town of Bodie, California: a critical bibliography. Sacramento: California Division of Beaches and Parks. OCLC 58742626.
- Johnson, R.; Johnson, A (1967). The ghost town of Bodie, as reported in the newspapers of the day. Bishop, Calif: Chalfant Press for Sierra Media. OCLC 1592631.
- McDonald, D. (1988). Bodie, boom town-gold town: the last of California's old-time mining camps. Las Vegas, Nev: Nevada Publications. ISBN 0913814881. OCLC 21384472.
- Morse, T.I.; Joseph, L. (1990). Photographing Bodie: a photographer's guide to the ghost town of Bodie, California. Santa Barbara, Calif: Global Preservation Projects. OCLC 54961458.
- Piatt, Michael H. (2003). Bodie: "The Mines Are Looking Well...". El Sobrante, Calif: North Bay Books. ISBN 0972520058.
- Retailers Protective Association (1880). Delinquent list of Virginia City, Gold Hill, Carson and Reno Nevada, and Bodie, California. OCLC 28163028.
- Wedertz, F.S. (1969). Bodie, 1859–1900. Bishop, Calif: Chalfant Press. OCLC 27440.
